= Outline of Finland =

Country in Northern Europe

The Flag of Finland

The Coat of arms of Finland

The location of Finland

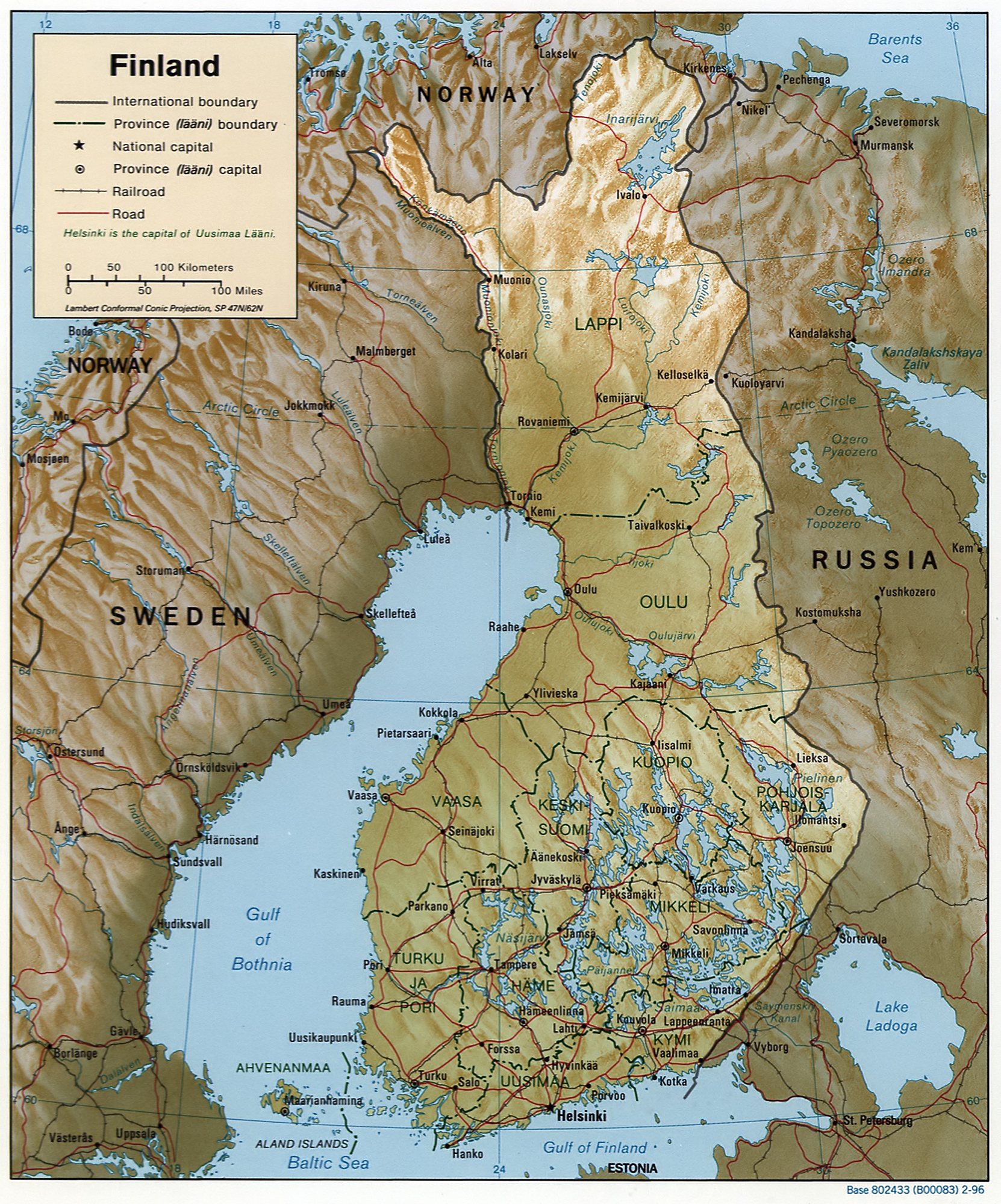
An enlargeable relief map of the Republic of Finland

The following outline is provided as an overview of and topical guide to Finland.

Finland – sovereign Nordic country located in Northern Europe. Finland has borders with Sweden to the west, Russia to the east, and Norway to the north, while Estonia lies to its south across the Gulf of Finland. The capital city is Helsinki.

Around 5.62 million people reside in Finland, with the majority concentrated in the southern part of country. It is the eighth largest country in Europe in terms of area and the most sparsely populated country in the European Union. The native language for most of the population is Finnish, a member of the Uralic language family most closely related to Estonian and one of the four EU languages not of Indo-European origin. The second official language, Swedish, is spoken by a 5.5 percent minority. Finland is a democratic, parliamentary republic with a central government and local governments in 309 (2021)/308 municipalities (as of 1 January 2025). Greater Helsinki (including Helsinki, Espoo, Vantaa and Kauniainen) totals a million residents and a third of the GDP. Other major cities include Tampere, Turku, and Oulu.

Finland was historically part of Sweden and from 1809 an autonomous Grand Duchy within the Russian Empire. Finland's declaration of independence in 1917 from Russia was followed by a civil war, wars against the Soviet Union and Nazi Germany, and a period of official neutrality during the Cold War. Finland joined the United Nations in 1955, the European Union in 1995, and NATO in 2023, and participates in the Eurozone. Finland has been ranked the second most stable country in the world, in a survey based on social, economic, political, and military indicators.

Finland has seen excellent results in many international comparisons of national performance such as the share of high-technology manufacturing, the rate of gross domestic product growth, and the protection of civil liberties.

== General reference ==
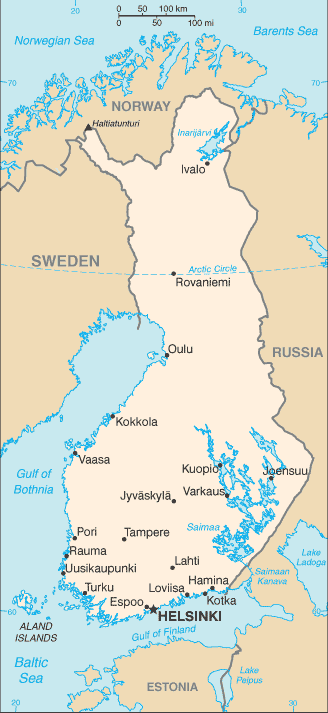
An enlargeable basic map of Finland

- Pronunciation: /ˈfɪnlənd/
- Common English country name: Finland
- Official English country name: The Republic of Finland
- Common endonym(s): Suomi
- Official endonym(s): Suomen tasavalta
- Adjectival(s): Finnish
- Demonym(s): Finns
- Etymology: Name of Finland
- International rankings of Finland
- ISO country codes: FI, FIN, 246
- ISO region codes: See ISO 3166-2:FI
- Internet country code top-level domain: .fi

== Geography of Finland ==
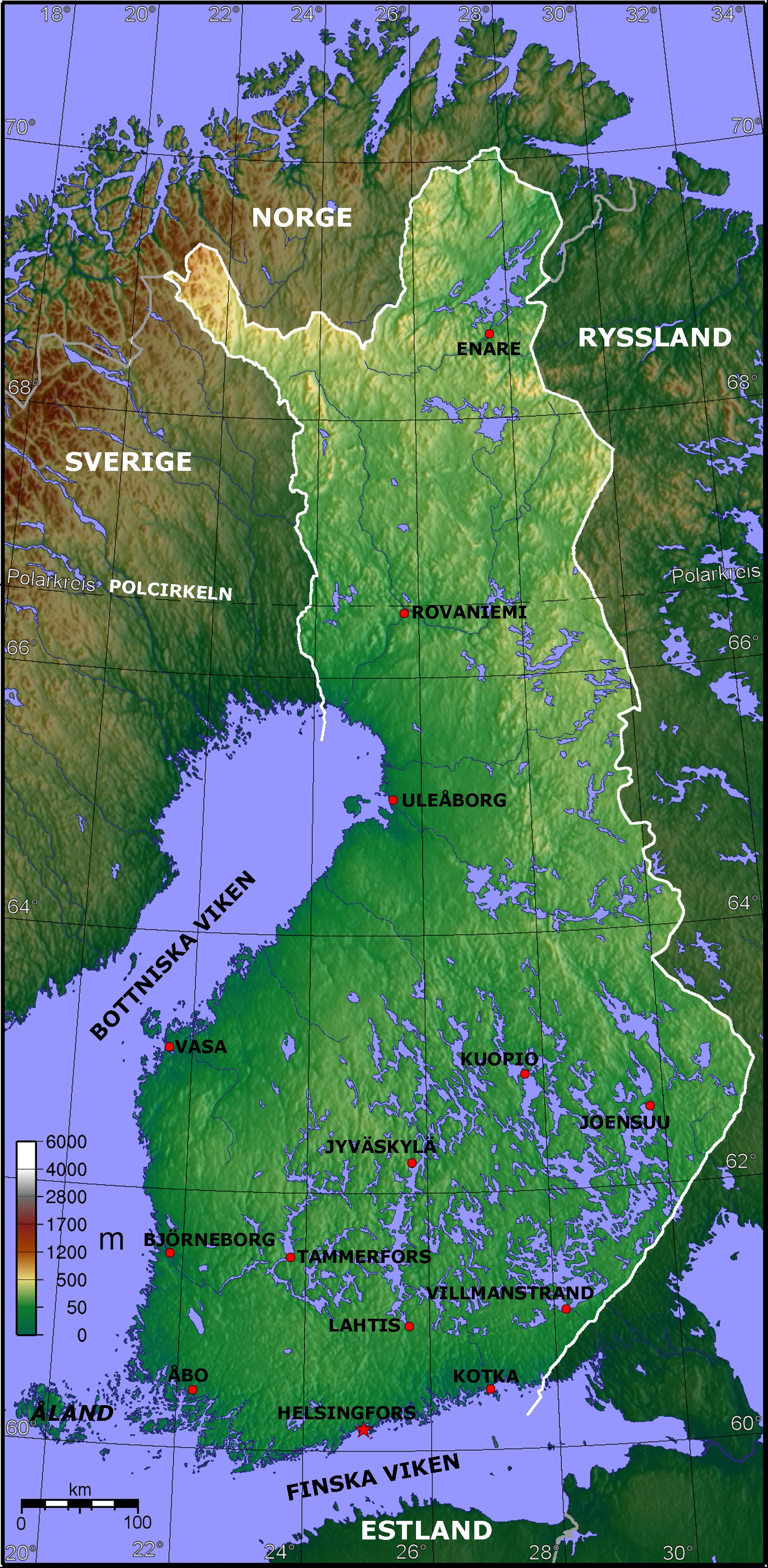
An enlargeable topographic map of Finland

Geography of Finland

- Finland is: a Nordic country
- Location:
  - Northern Hemisphere and Eastern Hemisphere
  - Eurasia
    - Europe
      - Northern Europe
        - Nordic countries
  - Time zone: Eastern European Time (UTC+02), Eastern European Summer Time (UTC+03)
  - Extreme points of Finland
    - High: Halti 1,324 m (4,344 ft)
    - Low: Baltic Sea 0 m
  - Land boundaries: 2,654 km

Russia 1,313 km
Norway 727 km
Sweden 614 km

- Coastline: 1,250 km

- Population of Finland: 5,635,560 (November 19, 2024) - 112th most populous country
- Area of Finland: 338,145 km^{2}
- Atlas of Finland

=== Environment of Finland ===
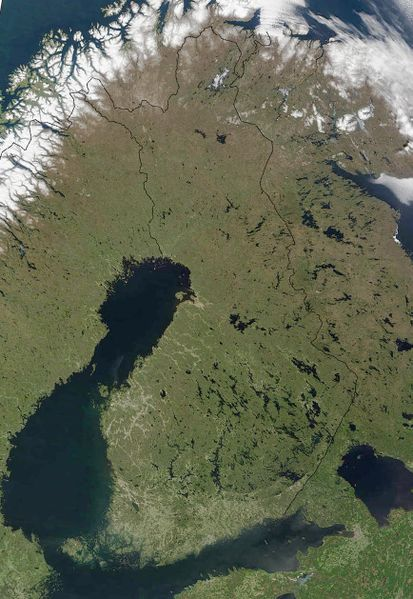
An enlargeable satellite image of Finland

- Climate of Finland
- Environmental issues in Finland
- Renewable energy in Finland
- Geology of Finland
- Protected areas of Finland
  - Biosphere reserves in Finland
  - National parks of Finland
- Wildlife of Finland
  - Fauna of Finland
    - Birds of Finland
    - Mammals of Finland

==== Natural geographic features of Finland ====
- Islands of Finland
- Lakes of Finland
- Rivers of Finland
- World Heritage Sites in Finland

=== Regions of Finland ===
Regions of Finland

==== Ecoregions of Finland ====
List of ecoregions in Finland

==== Administrative divisions of Finland ====
Administrative divisions of Finland

- Provinces of Finland
  - Regions of Finland
    - Sub-regions of Finland
      - Municipalities of Finland

===== Provinces of Finland =====
Provinces of Finland

===== Regions of Finland =====
Regions of Finland

===== Municipalities of Finland =====
Municipalities of Finland

- Capital of Finland: Helsinki
- Cities of Finland

=== Demography of Finland ===
Demographics of Finland

== Government and politics of Finland ==
- Form of government: semi-presidential representative democratic republic
- Capital of Finland: Helsinki
- Elections in Finland
- Political parties in Finland
- Taxation in Finland

=== Branches of the government of Finland ===
Government of Finland

==== Executive branch of the government of Finland ====
- Head of state: President of Finland,
- Head of government: Prime Minister of Finland,
- Cabinet of Finland

==== Legislative branch of the government of Finland ====
- Parliament of Finland (unicameral)

==== Judicial branch of the government of Finland ====
Judicial system of Finland

- General Courts of Finland
  - District Courts of Finland
  - Courts of Appeals of Finland
  - Supreme Court of Finland
- Administrative Courts of Finland
  - Regional Administrative Courts of Finland
  - Supreme Administrative Court of Finland
- Special Courts of Finland
  - Market Court of Finland
  - Labour Court of Finland
  - Insurance Court of Finland
  - High Court of Impeachment of Finland

=== Foreign relations of Finland ===
Foreign relations of Finland

- Diplomatic missions in Finland
- Diplomatic missions of Finland

==== International organization membership ====
The Republic of Finland is a member of:

- African Development Bank Group (AfDB) (nonregional member)
- Arctic Council
- Asian Development Bank (ADB) (nonregional member)
- Australia Group
- Bank for International Settlements (BIS)
- Confederation of European Paper Industries (CEPI)
- Council of Europe (CE)
- Council of the Baltic Sea States (CBSS)
- Economic and Monetary Union (EMU)
- Euro-Atlantic Partnership Council (EAPC)
- European Bank for Reconstruction and Development (EBRD)
- European Investment Bank (EIB)
- European Organization for Nuclear Research (CERN)
- European Space Agency (ESA)
- European Union (EU)
- Food and Agriculture Organization (FAO)
- Group of 9 (G9)
- Inter-American Development Bank (IADB)
- International Atomic Energy Agency (IAEA)
- International Bank for Reconstruction and Development (IBRD)
- International Chamber of Commerce (ICC)
- International Civil Aviation Organization (ICAO)
- International Criminal Court (ICCt)
- International Criminal Police Organization (Interpol)
- International Development Association (IDA)
- International Energy Agency (IEA)
- International Federation of Red Cross and Red Crescent Societies (IFRCS)
- International Finance Corporation (IFC)
- International Fund for Agricultural Development (IFAD)
- International Hydrographic Organization (IHO)
- International Labour Organization (ILO)
- International Maritime Organization (IMO)
- International Mobile Satellite Organization (IMSO)
- International Monetary Fund (IMF)
- International Olympic Committee (IOC)
- International Organization for Migration (IOM)
- International Organization for Standardization (ISO)
- International Red Cross and Red Crescent Movement (ICRM)
- International Telecommunication Union (ITU)
- International Telecommunications Satellite Organization (ITSO)
- International Trade Union Confederation (ITUC)
- Inter-Parliamentary Union (IPU)
- Multilateral Investment Guarantee Agency (MIGA)
- Nordic Council (NC)
- Nordic Investment Bank (NIB)
- North Atlantic Treaty Organization (NATO)
- Nuclear Energy Agency (NEA)
- Nuclear Suppliers Group (NSG)
- Organisation for Economic Co-operation and Development (OECD)
- Organization for Security and Cooperation in Europe (OSCE)
- Organisation for the Prohibition of Chemical Weapons (OPCW)
- Organization of American States (OAS) (observer)
- Paris Club
- Partnership for Peace (PFP)
- Permanent Court of Arbitration (PCA)
- Schengen Convention
- United Nations (UN)
- United Nations Conference on Trade and Development (UNCTAD)
- United Nations Educational, Scientific, and Cultural Organization (UNESCO)
- United Nations High Commissioner for Refugees (UNHCR)
- United Nations Industrial Development Organization (UNIDO)
- United Nations Military Observer Group in India and Pakistan (UNMOGIP)
- United Nations Mission in Liberia (UNMIL)
- United Nations Mission in the Sudan (UNMIS)
- United Nations Truce Supervision Organization (UNTSO)
- Universal Postal Union (UPU)
- Western European Union (WEU) (observer)
- World Customs Organization (WCO)
- World Federation of Trade Unions (WFTU)
- World Health Organization (WHO)
- World Intellectual Property Organization (WIPO)
- World Meteorological Organization (WMO)
- World Trade Organization (WTO)
- World Veterans Federation
- Zangger Committee (ZC)

=== Law and order in Finland ===
Law of Finland

- Capital punishment in Finland
- Constitution of Finland
- Crime in Finland
- Human rights in Finland
  - LGBT rights in Finland
  - Freedom of religion in Finland
- Law enforcement in Finland

=== Military of Finland ===
Military of Finland

- Command
  - Commander-in-chief:
    - Ministry of Defence of Finland
- Forces
  - Army of Finland
  - Navy of Finland
  - Air Force of Finland
  - Special forces of Finland
- Military history of Finland
- Military ranks of Finland

=== Local government in Finland ===
Local government in Finland

== History of Finland ==
History of Finland

- Military history of Finland

== Culture of Finland ==
Culture of Finland

- Architecture of Finland
- Cuisine of Finland
- Festivals in Finland
- Languages of Finland
- Media in Finland
- National symbols of Finland
  - Coat of arms of Finland
  - Flag of Finland
  - National anthem of Finland
- People of Finland
- Sex work in Finland
- Public holidays in Finland
- History of philosophy in Finland
- Religion in Finland
  - Buddhism in Finland
  - Christianity in Finland
  - Hinduism in Finland
  - Islam in Finland
  - Judaism in Finland
  - Sikhism in Finland
- World Heritage Sites in Finland

=== Art in Finland ===
- Art in Finland
- Cinema of Finland
- Literature of Finland
- Music of Finland
- Television in Finland
- Theatre in Finland

=== Sports in Finland ===
Sports in Finland

- Football in Finland
- Finland at the Olympics

== Economy and infrastructure of Finland ==
Economy of Finland

- Economic rank, by nominal GDP (2007): 34th (thirty-fourth)
- Agriculture in Finland
- Banking in Finland
  - National bank of Finland
- Communications in Finland
  - Internet in Finland
- Companies of Finland
- Currency of Finland: Euro (see also: Euro topics)
  - ISO 4217: EUR
- Energy in Finland
  - Energy policy of Finland
  - Oil industry in Finland
- Health care in Finland
- Mining in Finland
- Finland Stock Exchange
- Tourism in Finland
- Transport in Finland
  - Airports in Finland
  - Rail transport in Finland
  - Roads in Finland

== Education in Finland ==
Education in Finland

- List of schools in Finland
- List of polytechnics in Finland
- List of universities in Finland

== See also ==
Finland

- List of Finland-related topics
- List of international rankings
- Member state of the European Union
- Member states of NATO
- Member state of the United Nations
- Outline of Europe
- Outline of geography
