= List of Finnish poets =

An A–Z list of poets from Finland and poets who have written either in the Finnish language or Swedish language with dates of birth and death:

== A ==
- Aleksanteri Aava (1883–1956)
- Catharina Ahlgren (1734–1800)
- August Ahlqvist (1826–1889)
- Isa Asp (1853–1872)

== B ==
- Christina Regina von Birchenbaum (died 1651)

== C ==
- Paavo Cajander (1846–1913)
- Fredrik Cygnaeus (1807–1881)

== E ==
- Rabbe Enckell (1903–1974)

== F ==
- Kati-Claudia Fofonoff (1947–2011)
- Frans Michael Franzén (1772–1847)
- Jacob Frese (1690–1729)

== G ==
- Arvid Genetz (1848–1915)
- Beata Sofia Gyldén (1804–1864)

== H ==
- Paavo Haavikko (1931–2008)
- Martti Haavio (1899–1973)
- Helvi Hämäläinen (1907–1998)
- Galit Hasan-Rokem (born 1945)
- Aaro Hellaakoski (1893–1952)
- Immi Hellén (1861–1937)
- Anselm Hollo (1934–2013)
- Elsa Holmsten (1709/1710–1735)

== I ==
- Jouni Inkala (born 1966)
- Markku Into (born 1945)

== J ==
- Helvi Juvonen (1919–1959)

== K ==
- Uuno Kailas (1901–1933), poet, author, translator
- Anu Kaipainen (1933–2009)
- Viljo Kajava (1909–1998), poet and writer
- Ilmari Kianto, also known as Ilmari Calamnius and Ilmari Iki-Kianto (1874–1970)
- Väinö Kirstinä (1936–2007)
- Anna-Reeta Korhonen (1809–1893)
- Veikko Antero Koskenniemi (1886–1962)
- Julius Krohn (1835–1888), folk poetry researcher, professor of Finnish literature, poet, hymn writer, translator and journalist
- Kirsi Kunnas (1924–2021), poet, children's literature author and translator

== L ==
- Jarkko Laine (1947–2006)
- Joel Lehtonen (1881–1934)
- Eino Leino (1878–1926)
- Rakel Liehu (born 1939)

== M ==
- Pali-Maija (1784–1867)
- Ingeborg Malmström (1831–1919)
- Eeva-Liisa Manner (1921–1995)
- Otto Manninen (1872–1950)
- Arto Melleri (1956–2005)
- Barbara Catharina Mjödh (1738–1776)
- Agatha Lovisa de la Myle (1724–1787)

== N ==
- Mikaela Nyman (born 1966)
- Carita Nyström (1940–2019)

== O ==
- L. Onerva (1882–1972)

== P ==
- Larin Paraske (1833–1904)
- Jyrki Pellinen (born 1940)

== R ==
- Risto Rasa (born 1954)
- Elsa Rautee (1897–1987)
- Mirkka Rekola (1931–2014)
- Johan Ludvig Runeberg (1804–1877), the national poet of Finland

== S ==
- Pentti Saarikoski (1937–1983)
- Leif Salmén (1952–2019)
- Kaarlo Sarkia (1902–1945)
- Juhani Siljo (1888–1918)
- Maria Simointytär (?)
- Axel Gabriel Sjöström (1794–1846)
- Edith Södergran (1892–1923)
- Catharina Charlotta Swedenmarck (1744–1813)

== T ==
- Örnulf Tigerstedt (1900–1962)
- Jarkko Tontti (born 1971), author, poet, and lawyer
- Zachris Topelius (1818–1898)
- Ole Torvalds (1916–1995)

== U ==
- Uusitalo Arja (born 1951)

== V ==
- Katri Vala (1901–1944)
- Nils-Aslak Valkeapää (1943–2001)
- Anja Vammelvuo (1921–1988)
- Boris Verho
- Lauri Viita (1916–1965)
- Augusta Vörlund (1807–1869)
- Einari Vuorela (1889–1972)

== W ==
- Josef Julius Wecksell (1838–1907)
- Sigurd Wettenhovi-Aspa (1870–1946)

== Y ==
- A. W. Yrjänä (born 1967)

== See also ==
- Lists of poets
