= List of Finland-related topics =

This is a collection of articles relating to Finland, a country in Northern Europe.

== The main article ==
- Finland

== Administrative regions ==
- Historical provinces of Finland
- List of cities and towns in Finland
  - Helsinki
  - Mariehamn
  - Oulu
  - Tampere
  - Turku
- Municipalities of Finland
- Provinces of Finland
  - Eastern Finland
  - Lapland
  - Oulu
  - Southern Finland
  - Western Finland
  - Åland Islands (Autonomous region)
- Regions of Finland

== Communications ==
- Communications in Finland
- Transportation in Finland
  - Finnair

== Culture ==
- Architects
  - Alvar Aalto
  - Eero Saarinen
  - Eliel Saarinen
- Artists
  - Akseli Gallen-Kallela
  - Albert Edelfelt
  - Helene Schjerfbeck
  - Hugo Simberg
  - Magnus Enckell
- Composers
  - Leevi Madetoja
  - Oskar Merikanto
  - Einojuhani Rautavaara
  - Kaija Saariaho
  - Jean Sibelius
- Conductors
  - Paavo Berglund
  - Esa-Pekka Salonen
  - Jukka-Pekka Saraste
  - Leif Segerstam
  - Sakari Oramo
  - Osmo Vänskä
- Finnish cuisine
  - Kalakukko
  - Karelian pasties
  - Mustamakkara
  - Mämmi
  - Sahti
- Filmmakers
  - Renny Harlin
  - Aki Kaurismäki
- Flag flying days in Finland
- Holidays in Finland
- Kalevala
  - Elias Lönnrot
- Finnish national symbols
  - National anthem of Finland
  - Flag of Finland
  - Coat of arms of Finland
- Music of Finland
  - Kantele
- Literature
- Mythology
- Namesdays in Finland
- Opera singers
  - Karita Mattila
- Poets
- List of Finnish poets
  - Eino Leino
  - Johan Ludvig Runeberg
  - Edith Södergran
- Sauna
- Valtion elokuvatarkastamo (Finnish Board of Film Classification)
- Writers
  - Väinö Linna
    - The Unknown Soldier (novel)
  - Frans Emil Sillanpää
  - Tove Jansson
  - Mika Waltari
    - The Egyptian

== Demography and languages ==
- Finland's language strife
- Finnish alphabet
- Finnish grammar
- Finns
- Minorities
  - Swedish-speaking Finns
    - Finland Swedish
    - Swedish language
  - Roma
    - Romany language
  - Sami people
    - Sami languages
  - History of the Jews in Finland

== Economy ==
- Finland and Globalization
- List of Finnish companies
  - Finnair
  - Nokia
  - Nordea
  - Stora Enso
  - UPM-Kymmene
  - YLE
- List of Finnish newspapers
- Suomen Pankki
- Tourism in Finland

== Education and science ==
- List of schools in Finland
- List of polytechnics in Finland
- List of universities in Finland
  - University of Helsinki
  - Aalto University
  - University of Eastern Finland
  - University of Jyväskylä
  - University of Lapland
  - University of Oulu
  - University of Tampere
  - University of Turku
  - University of Vaasa
  - Åbo Akademi University
  - Academy of Fine Arts
  - Lappeenranta-Lahti University of Technology LUT
  - Sibelius Academy
  - Hanken School of Economics
  - Tampere University of Technology
  - The Theatre Academy
- Scientists
  - Johan Gadolin
  - Ragnar Granit
  - Ernst Leonard Lindelöf
  - Rolf Nevanlinna
  - Linus Torvalds
  - Edvard Westermarck
  - Artturi Ilmari Virtanen
  - Yrjö Väisälä
  - Georg Henrik von Wright
  - Arvo Ylppö

== Environment ==
- Animals found only or typically in Finland
  - Flying squirrel
  - Norppa
- National parks of Finland
- Protected areas of Finland

== Geography ==
- Eurasia
- Europe
- Hills and mountains
  - Haltitunturi
- Islands
  - Hailuoto
  - Åland Islands
- List of lakes in Finland
  - Inari
  - Päijänne
  - Saimaa
- List of rivers of Finland
- Salpausselkä
- Scandinavia
- Sea areas
  - Gulf of Bothnia
  - Gulf of Finland

== History ==
- Finland's language strife
  - Fennoman
- Foreign relations of Finland
  - Finno-Soviet Treaty of 1948
  - Finlandization
  - Paasikivi-Kekkonen Line
- Historical figures
  - Mikael Agricola
  - Per Brahe the Younger
  - List of presidents of Finland
  - Carl Gustaf Emil Mannerheim
  - Urho Kekkonen
  - Martti Ahtisaari
- List of Finnish wars
  - Aunus expedition
  - Continuation War
  - Estonian Liberation War
  - Finnish Civil War
  - Lapland War
  - Viena expedition
  - Winter War

== Lists ==
- List of Finnish politicians
- List of Finnish provinces
- List of Finnish municipalities
  - List of Finnish municipalities by population
  - List of Finnish municipalities by area
- List of universities in Finland
- List of Finnish newspapers
- List of Finnish companies
- List of Finnish wars
- List of Finns
- List of lakes in Finland
- List of presidents of Finland
- List of prime ministers of Finland

== Politics ==
- Constitution of Finland
- Elections in Finland
- Finnish Defence Forces
- Government of Finland
- List of Finnish politicians
- Parliament of Finland
- President of Finland
- Prime Minister of Finland

== Religion ==
- Evangelical Lutheran Church of Finland
- Finnish Orthodox Church
- Finnish mythology
- Finnish paganism
- Islam in Finland
- Irreligion in Finland

== Sport ==
- Finnish Student Sports Federation
- Athletes
  - Janne Ahonen
  - Sami Hyypiä
  - Mika Häkkinen
  - Heikki Kovalainen
  - Saku Koivu
  - Jari Kurri
  - Jari Litmanen
  - Paavo Nurmi
  - Matti Nykänen
  - Kimi Räikkönen
  - Teemu Selänne
  - Lasse Virén
- Finland national football team
- Finnish national men's ice hockey team
- Finnish sports
  - Kyykkä
  - Nordic walking
  - Pesäpallo

== Other pages ==
- Asbestos-Ceramic
- Finnish International Baccalaureate Society
- International rankings of Finland
- Golden Triangle (Finland)
- The Greatest Finns
- Gun politics in Finland
- Sisu
- Prostitution in Finland
- LGBT rights in Finland
- Homelessness
- Women

== See also ==
- Finnish (disambiguation)
