= List of Finnish politicians =

This is a list of Finnish politicians. See also: Category:Finnish politicians.

== 13th century ==
- Earl Birger, (1210-1266)

== 15th century ==
- Sten Sture the elder, (1470-1497 and 1501-1503)

== 16th century ==
- Gustav Vasa, (1496-1560)
- Mikael Agricola

== 17th century ==
- Per Brahe, (1602-1680)
- Jaakko Ilkka

== 18th century ==
- Augustin Ehrensvärd

== 19th century ==
- Gustaf Mauritz Armfelt
- Fredrik Cygnaeus
- Karl Ferdinand Ignatius
- Lauri Kivekäs
- Verner Lindberg
- Agathon Meurman
- Emil Nestor Setälä
- Johan Vilhelm Snellman
- Pehr Evind Svinhufvud
- Zacharias Topelius
- Yrjö Sakari Yrjö-Koskinen

== 20th century ==
- Esko Aho
- Martti Ahtisaari
- Teuvo Aura
- Aimo Cajander
- Kaarlo Castrén
- Urho Castren
- Rafael Erich
- Karl-August Fagerholm
- Rainer von Fieandt
- Johan Franzén
- Mikhail Fyodorovich Ganskau
- Antti Hackzell
- Viktor Hedlund
- Harri Holkeri
- Lauri Ingman
- Kaarlo Juho Ståhlberg
- Kyösti Kallio
- Ahti Karjalainen
- Urho Kekkonen
- Otto Ville Kuusinen
- Toivo Mikael Kivimäki
- Mauno Koivisto
- Reino Kuuskoski
- Reino Ragnar Lehto
- Keijo Liinamaa
- Edwin Linkomies
- Paavo Lipponen
- Carl Gustaf Emil Mannerheim
- Oskari Mantere
- Martti Miettunen
- Juho Kusti Paasikivi
- Rafael Paasio
- Mauno Pekkala
- Johan Wilhelm Rangell
- Lauri Kristian Relander
- Risto Ryti
- Eugen Schauman
- Kalevi Sorsa
- Jussi Sukselainen
- Juho Sunila
- Pehr Evind Svinhufvud
- Väinö Tanner
- Oskari Tokoi
- Ralf Törngren
- Antti Tulenheimo
- Sakari Tuomioja
- Juho Vennola
- Johannes Virolainen
- Paavo Väyrynen

== 21st century ==
- Claes Andersson
- Li Andersson
- Paavo Arhinmäki
- Pekka Haavisto
- Jussi Halla-aho
- Tony Halme
- Tarja Halonen
- Heidi Hautala
- Eero Heinäluoma
- Laura Huhtasaari
- Ville Itälä
- Anneli Jäätteenmäki
- Tanja Karpela
- Jyrki Katainen
- Mari Kiviniemi
- Martti Korhonen
- Merja Kyllönen
- Paavo Lipponen
- Maria Lohela
- Sanna Marin
- Silvia Modig
- Sauli Niinistö
- Petteri Orpo
- Mauri Pekkarinen
- Aino-Kaisa Pekonen
- Kari Rajamäki
- Paula Risikko
- Jussi Saramo
- Suvi-Anne Siimes
- Juha Sipilä
- Timo Soini
- Osmo Soininvaara
- Alexander Stubb
- Marja Tiura
- Erkki Tuomioja
- Jutta Urpilainen
- Matti Vanhanen
- Jan Vapaavuori
- Paavo Väyrynen

== See also ==
- President of Finland
- List of presidents of Finland
- Prime Minister of Finland
- List of prime ministers of Finland
- Provincial Governors of Finland
- List of Finnish rulers
- Governor-General of Finland
- List of Finns
- Politics of Finland
- Government of Finland
- Parliament of Finland
