= International rankings of Finland =

This table contains international rankings of Finland, including previous years when available.

Organisation	Survey	Year	Rank	Out of (countries)	Ref	Notes
Germanwatch	Climate Change Performance Index	2018	9	60		
A.T. Kearney / Foreign Policy Magazine	Globalization Index					
A.T. Kearney / Foreign Policy Magazine	Globalization Index	2007	18	72		
A.T. Kearney / Foreign Policy Magazine	Globalization Index	2006	13	62		
Yale University / Columbia University	Environmental Performance Index					
Yale University / Columbia University	Environmental Performance Index	2010	12	163		
Yale University / Columbia University	Environmental Performance Index	2008	4	149		
Yale University / Columbia University	Environmental Performance Index	2006	3	133		
IMD International	World Competitiveness Yearbook					
IMD International	World Competitiveness Yearbook	2010	19	58		
IMD International	World Competitiveness Yearbook	2008	15	55*		*economies (countries and regions)
IMD International	World Competitiveness Yearbook	2007	17	55		
IMD International	World Competitiveness Yearbook	2006	10	61		
Legatum Institute	Legatum Prosperity Index					
Legatum Institute	Legatum Prosperity Index	2009	1	104		
Newsweek	World's Best Countries					
Newsweek	World's Best Countries	2010	1	100		
Organisation for Economic Co-operation and Development (OECD)	Programme for International Student; Assessment (PISA)					
Organisation for Economic Co-operation and Development (OECD)	Programme for International Student; Assessment (PISA)	2006	→	57		rank 1 in science and ability to use scientific knowledge; rank 2 in reading literacy; rank 2 in mathematics
Organisation for Economic Co-operation and Development (OECD)	Programme for International Student; Assessment (PISA)	2003	→	41		rank 1 in science (tied with Japan); rank 1 in reading literacy; rank 2 in problem solving; rank 2 in mathematics
Organisation for Economic Co-operation and Development (OECD)	Programme for International Student; Assessment (PISA)	2000	→	43		rank 1 in reading performance
OECD	Survey of Adult Skills ("PISA for adults")	2023	1	31		rank 1 in literacy, rank 1 in numeracy, rank 1 (tied with Japan) in problem-solving skills
Reporters Without Borders	Worldwide Press Freedom Index					
Reporters Without Borders	Worldwide Press Freedom Index	2009	1	175		tied with Denmark, Ireland, Norway and Sweden
Reporters Without Borders	Worldwide Press Freedom Index	2008	4	173		tied with Estonia and Ireland
Reporters Without Borders	Worldwide Press Freedom Index	2007	5	169		tied with Belgium and Sweden
Reporters Without Borders	Worldwide Press Freedom Index	2006	1	168		tied with Iceland, Ireland and Netherlands
Save the Children	State of the World's Mothers					
Save the Children	State of the World's Mothers	2010	7	160		
Save the Children	State of the World's Mothers	2008	7	146		
Save the Children	State of the World's Mothers	2007	7	140		
Save the Children	State of the World's Mothers	2006	2	125		tied with Denmark
The Economist Intelligence Unit	Global Peace Index					
The Economist Intelligence Unit	Global Peace Index	2010	9	149		
The Economist Intelligence Unit	Global Peace Index	2008	8	140		
The Economist Intelligence Unit	Global Peace Index	2007	6	121		
Transparency International	Corruption Perceptions Index					
Transparency International	Corruption Perceptions Index	2009	6	180		tied with the Netherlands
Transparency International	Corruption Perceptions Index	2008	5	180		tied with Switzerland
Transparency International	Corruption Perceptions Index	2007	1	179		tied with Denmark and New Zealand
Transparency International	Corruption Perceptions Index	2006	1	163		tied with Iceland and New Zealand
United Nations Development Programme (UNDP)	Human Development Index					
United Nations Development Programme (UNDP)	Human Development Index	2007–2008	11	177		
United Nations Development Programme (UNDP)	Human Development Index	2006	11	177		
United Nations Development Programme (UNDP)	Human Development Index	2005	13	177		
United Nations Development Programme (UNDP)	Human Development Index	2004	13	177		
World Economic Forum	Global Competitiveness Index (Global Competitiveness Report)	2010–2011	7	139		
World Economic Forum	Global Competitiveness Index (Global Competitiveness Report)	2009–2010	6	133		
World Economic Forum	Global Competitiveness Index (Global Competitiveness Report)	2008–2009	6	134		
World Economic Forum	Global Competitiveness Index (Global Competitiveness Report)	2007–2008	6	131		
World Economic Forum	Networked Readiness Index (Global Information Technology Report)	2012	3	142		
World Economic Forum	Networked Readiness Index (Global Information Technology Report)	2013	1	143		
World Economic Forum	Networked Readiness Index (Global Information Technology Report)	2016	2	139		
World Health Organization	The World Health Organization's ranking of the world's health systems	2000	31	190		
World Intellectual Property Organization	Global Innovation Index	2026	8	139		
Programme for International Student Assessment	Science	2015	5	72		
Programme for International Student Assessment	Reading	2015	4	72		
Fund for Peace	Fragile States Index	2018	178*	178		*the most sustainable
United Nations	World Happiness Report	2019	1	156		
World Economic Forum	Global Gender Gap Report	2018	4	147		
	Good Country Index	2018	1	153		
World Economic Forum	Global Social Mobility Index	2020	3	82		

This is a helper page for the article Finland, which is to accommodate a maximum of three years per survey to keep the article size from growing oversized.

== See also ==
- List of Finland-related topics
