= Christina Regina von Birchenbaum =

Christina Regina von Birchenbaum, also spelled Börkenbohm, was a seventeenth-century Finnish poet. Her only surviving work is the autobiographical acrostic poem "En annan ny visa" ("Another New Song," 1651).

== "En annan ny visa" ==
The poem "En annan ny visa" is constructed of twenty-nine stanzas of eight lines each. Birchenbaum's full name is spelled out in acrostic form by the first letters of the stanzas. The poem's style is reminiscent of Finnish folk poetry. The only surviving copy of "En annan ny visa", dated 24 July 1651, is preserved in the Diocese Library in Linköping.

According to the poem, Birchenbaum was born in Karelia; her father died when she was three. She met her future husband early in life. Marrying him for love, she followed him to Germany for the Thirty Years' War. Learning from a message that he had disappeared in the war, she traveled across the country looking for him, and eventually gave him up for dead. After seventeen years alone, in which she kept "all worldly joy and pleasure" out of her mind, she married again, this time to a young nobleman. However, the marriage was an unhappy one, due to "false friends" and local gossip that drove the couple apart. Birchenbaum concludes the poem by saying that she is alone in the world once again, and is saying goodbye to it.

== Personal life ==
Very little is known of Birchenbaum's life other than the account given in "En annan ny visa". Two other documents survive relating to Birchenbaum; they are petitions dating from the late 1660s, featuring her testimony that she was the widow of Major Axel Paulj Liljenfeldt, who died in the Thirty Years' War while serving in the Swedish army. Birchenbaum was a contemporary (though a younger one) of the Finnish poet Sigfridus Aronus Forsius.

== Legacy ==
Birchenbaum and "En annan ny visa" were forgotten until the mid-nineteenth century, when the poem was rediscovered by the antiquarian Per Hanselli. It was first published in 1896. Before the authorship was established, the poem was attributed to a seventeenth-century Swedish poet, Lars Wivallius.

Birchenbaum is the first known female writer from Finland. (Maria Simointytär, whose poems were published anonymously in broadside form, was likely the first published Finnish female writer.) Birchenbaum was also the first known Finnish poet to write in the Swedish language. She is additionally notable in that "En annan ny visa" is the only firsthand literary account of Finland's participation fighting under Sweden in the Thirty Years' War.
