= List of birds of Finland =

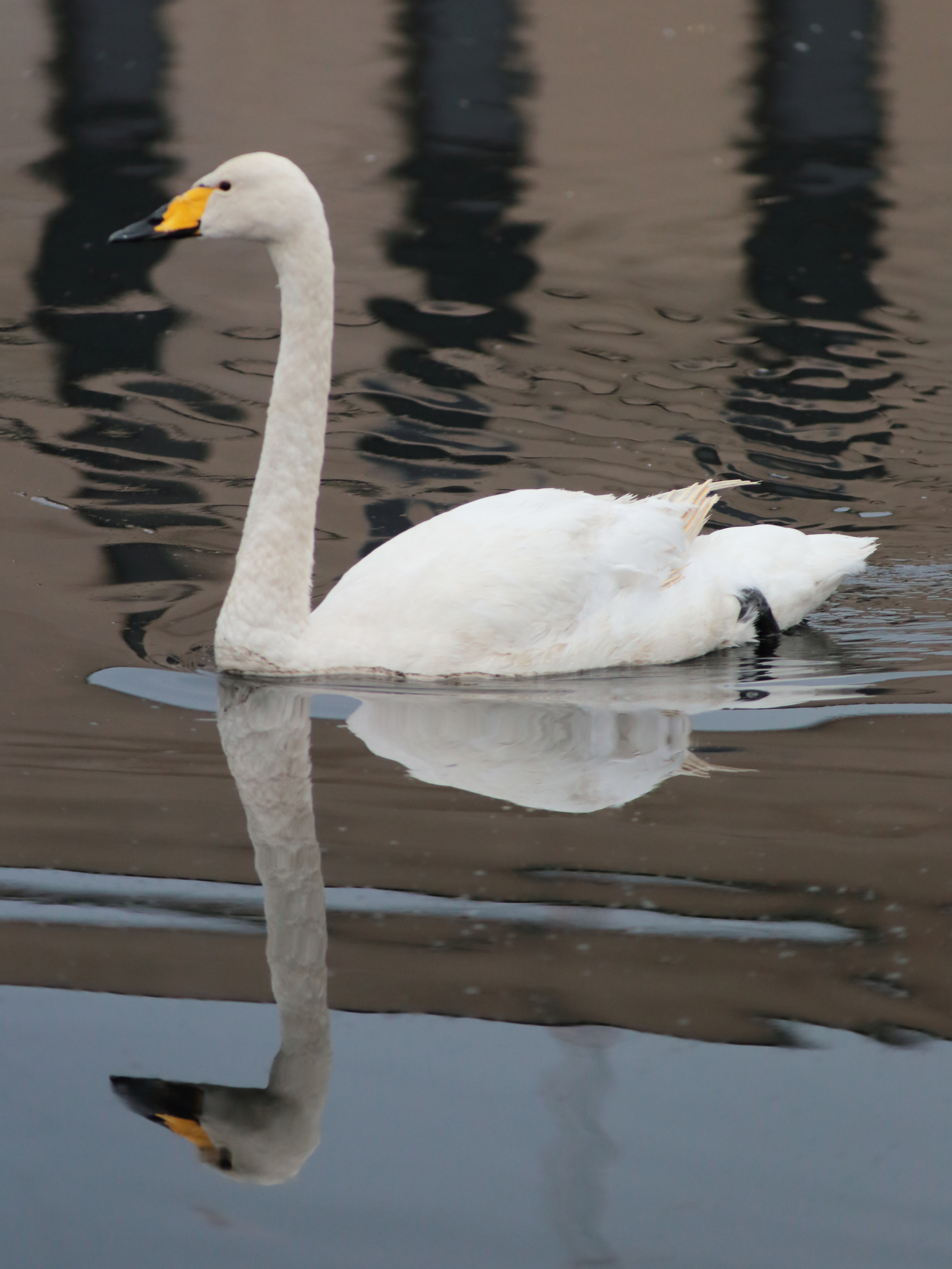
A whooper swan in Oulu. This species is the national bird of Finland.

This is a list of the bird species recorded in Finland. The avifauna of Finland included a total of 501 confirmed species as of October 2024, according to BirdLife Suomi. Of them, six have been introduced by humans, and six have not been reported in Finland since 1950.

This list's taxonomic treatment (designation and sequence of orders, families and species) and nomenclature (English, Finnish and scientific names) are from the BirdLife Suomi list.

The following tags have been used to highlight some categories of occurrence:

- (A) Accidental – a species which is rare in Finland, requiring submission to the Finnish Rarities Committee (Rariteettikomitea) for acceptance
- (I) Introduced – a species introduced to Finland as a consequence, direct or indirect, of human actions
- (H) Historical – a species that has not occurred in Finland since 1950

== Ducks, geese, and waterfowl ==
Order: Anseriformes Family: Anatidae

Anatidae includes the ducks and most duck-like waterfowl, such as geese and swans. These birds are adapted to an aquatic existence with webbed feet, flattened bills, and feathers that are excellent at shedding water due to an oily coating.

- Mute swan (kyhmyjoutsen), Cygnus olor
- Bewick's swan (pikkujoutsen), Cygnus columbianus
- Whooper swan (laulujoutsen), Cygnus cygnus
- Taiga bean goose (metsähanhi), Anser fabalis
- Pink-footed goose (lyhytnokkahanhi), Anser brachyrhynchus
- Greater white-fronted goose (tundrahanhi), Anser albifrons
- Lesser white-fronted goose (kiljuhanhi), Anser erythropus
- Greylag goose (merihanhi), Anser anser
- Bar-headed goose (tiibetinhanhi), Anser indicus (I)
- Canada goose (kanadanhanhi), Branta canadensis (I)
- Cackling goose (pikkukanadanhanhi), Branta hutchinsii (A)
- Barnacle goose (valkoposkihanhi), Branta leucopsis
- Brant goose (sepelhanhi), Branta bernicla
- Red-breasted goose (punakaulahanhi), Branta ruficollis
- Ruddy shelduck (ruostesorsa), Tadorna ferruginea
- Common shelduck (ristisorsa), Tadorna tadorna
- Mandarin duck (mandariinisorsa), Aix galericulata (I)
- Eurasian wigeon (haapana), Mareca penelope
- American wigeon (amerikanhaapana), Mareca americana (A)
- Gadwall (harmaasorsa), Mareca strepera
- Baikal teal (siperiantavi), Sibirionetta formosa (A)
- Eurasian teal (tavi), Anas crecca
- Green-winged teal (amerikantavi), Anas carolinensis (A)
- Mallard (sinisorsa), Anas platyrhynchos
- American black duck (nokisorsa), Anas rubribes (A)
- Northern pintail (jouhisorsa), Anas acuta
- Garganey (heinätavi), Spatula querquedula
- Blue-winged teal (sinisiipitavi), Spatula discors (A)
- Northern shoveler (lapasorsa), Spatula clypeata
- Red-crested pochard (punapäänarsku), Netta rufina (A)
- Common pochard (punasotka), Aythya ferina
- Ring-necked duck (amerikantukkasotka), Aythya collaris (A)
- Ferruginous duck (ruskosotka), Aythya nyroca (A)
- Tufted duck (tukkasotka), Aythya fuligula
- Greater scaup (lapasotka), Aythya marila
- Lesser scaup (pikkulapasotka), Aythya affinis (A)
- Common eider (haahka), Somateria mollissima
- King eider (kyhmyhaahka), Somateria spectabilis
- Steller's eider (allihaahka), Polysticta stelleri
- Harlequin duck (virta-alli), Histrionicus histrionicus (A)
- Long-tailed duck (alli), Clangula hyemalis
- Common scoter (mustalintu), Melanitta nigra
- Black scoter (amerikanmustalintu), Melanitta americana (A)
- Surf scoter (pilkkaniska), Melanitta perspicillata (A)
- Velvet scoter (pilkkasiipi), Melanitta fusca
- White-winged scoter (kyhmypilkkasiipi), Melanitta deglandi (A)
- Common goldeneye (telkkä), Bucephala clangula
- Smew (uivelo), Mergellus albellus
- Red-breasted merganser (tukkakoskelo), Mergus serrator
- Goosander (isokoskelo), Mergus merganser
- Ruddy duck (kuparisorsa), Oxyura jamaicensis (I)

'

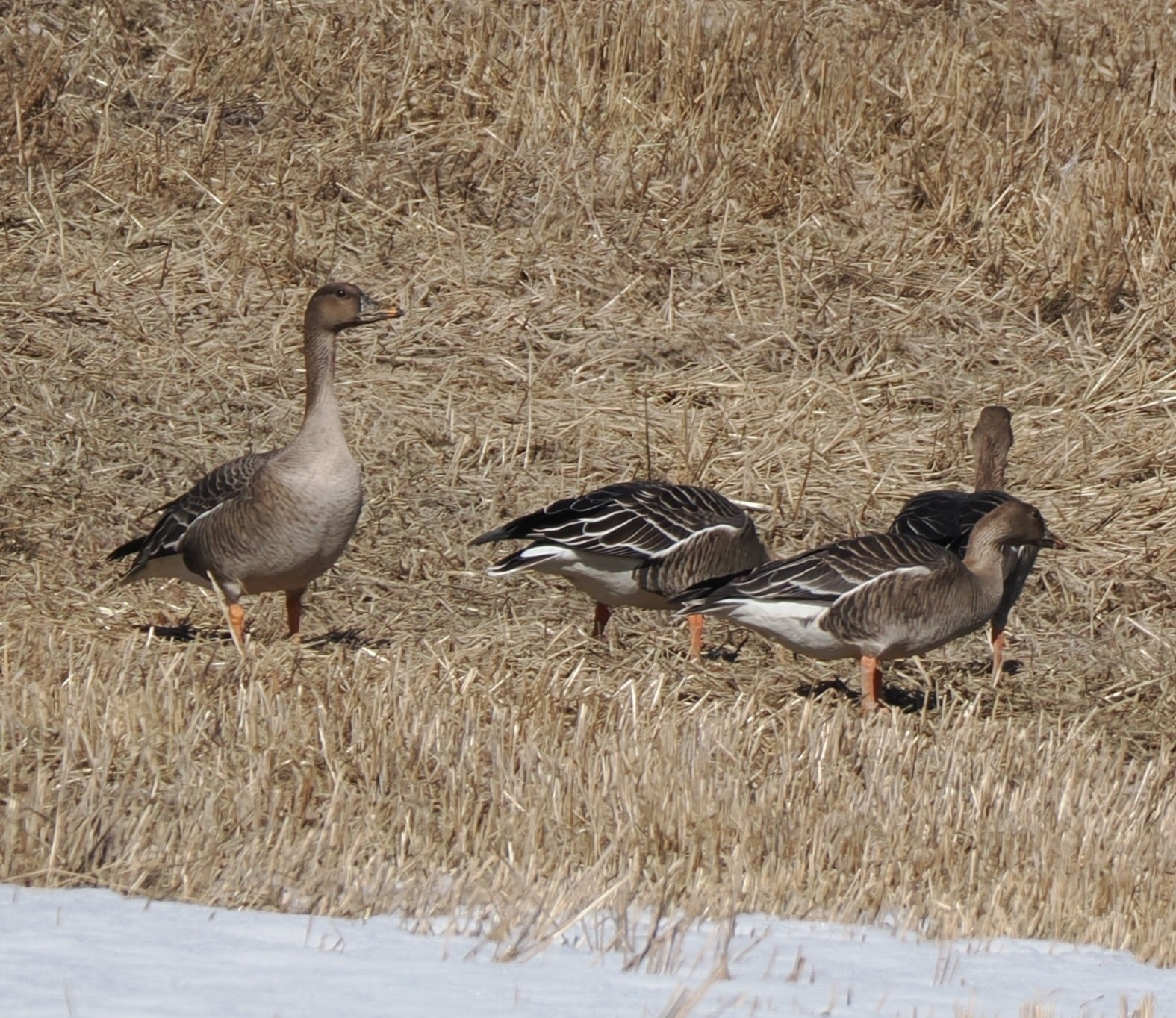
Taiga bean geese, Kangasala

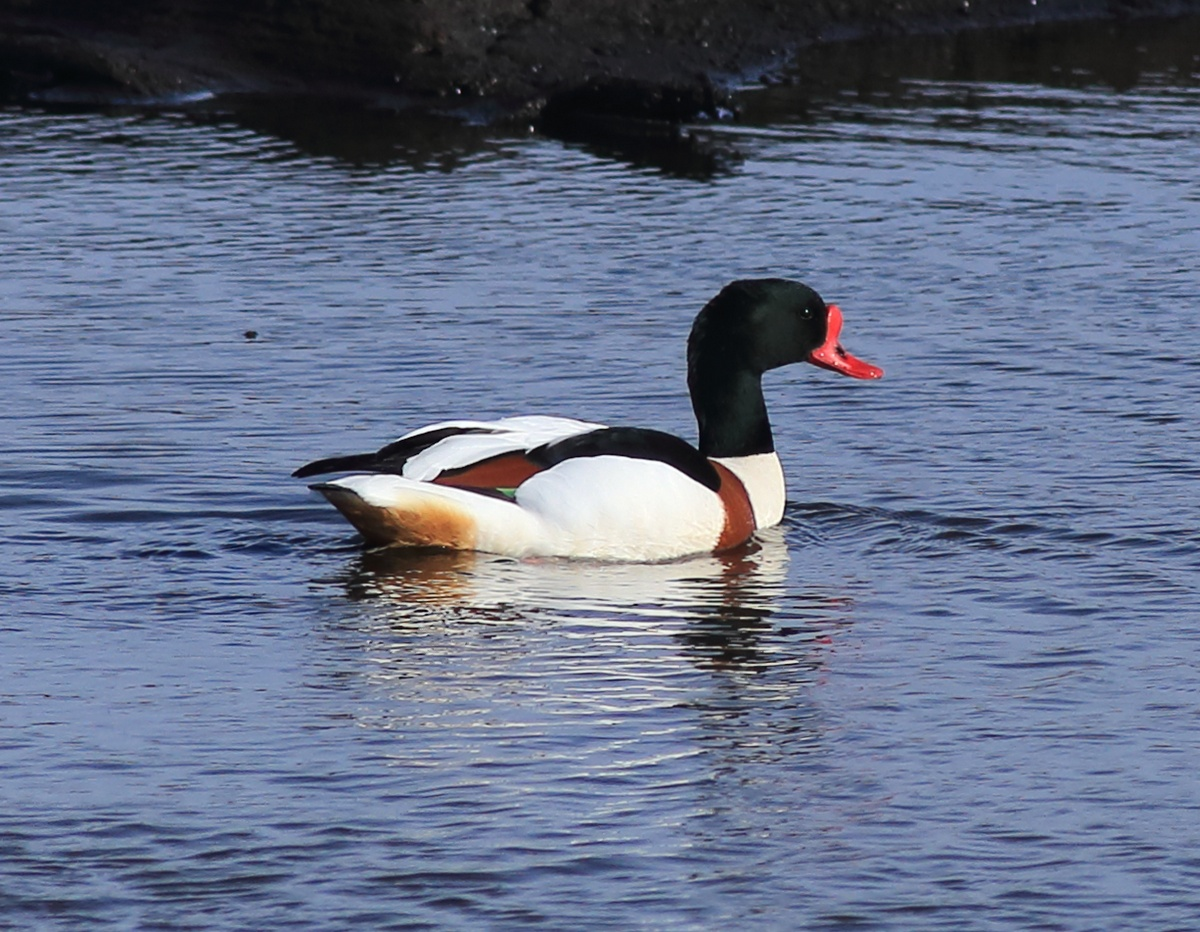
Common shelduck, Oulu

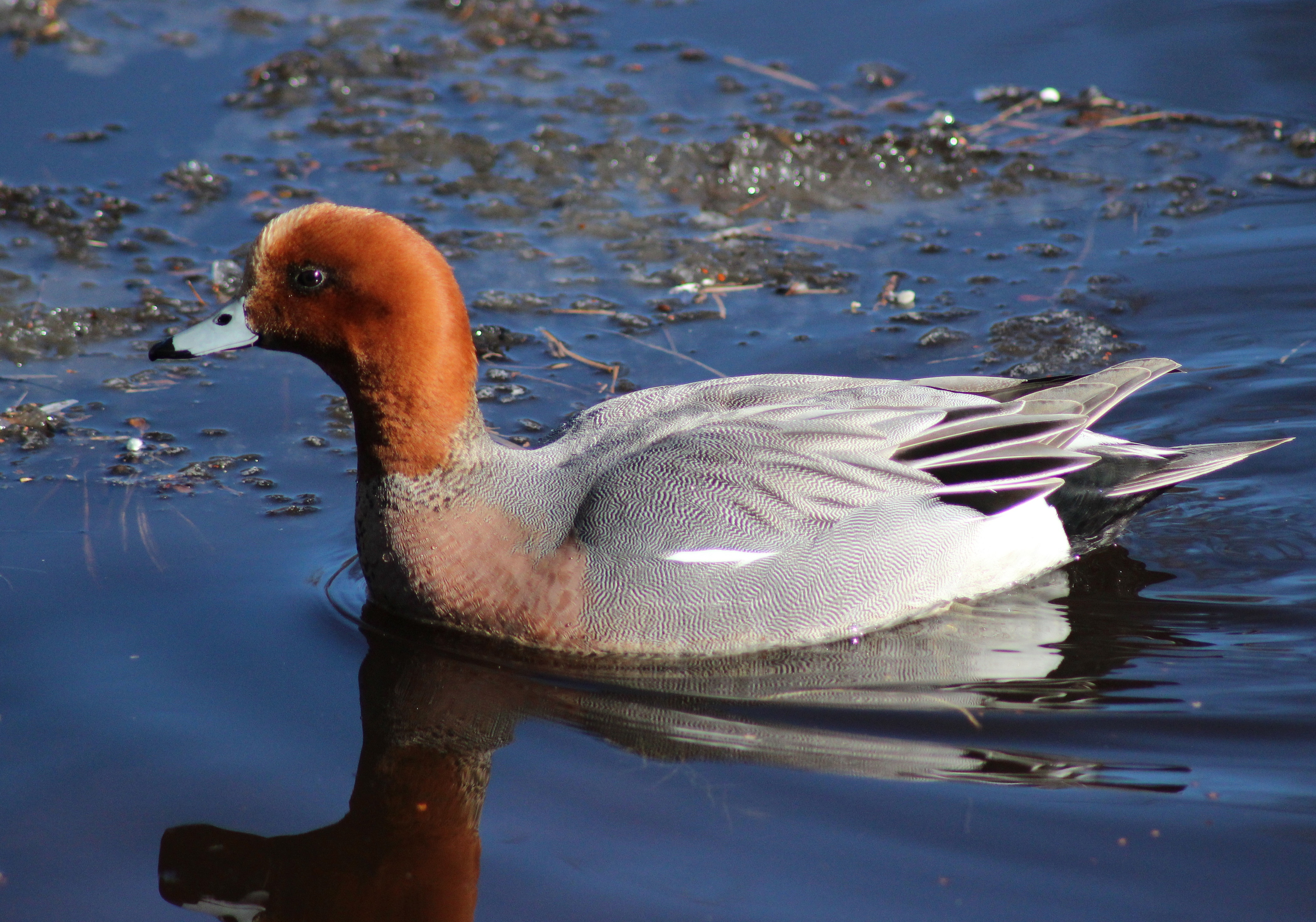
Eurasian wigeon, Oulu

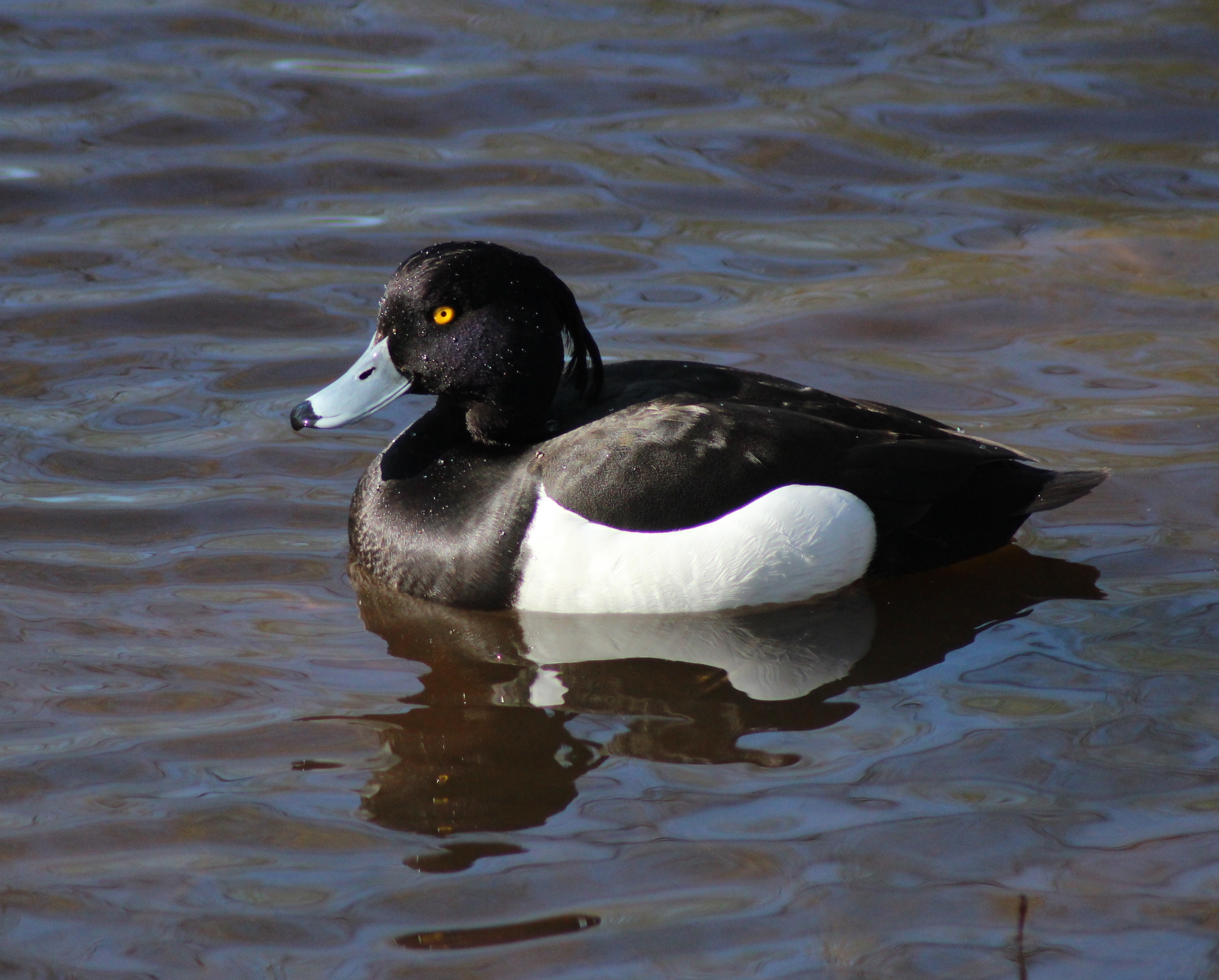
Tufted duck, Oulu

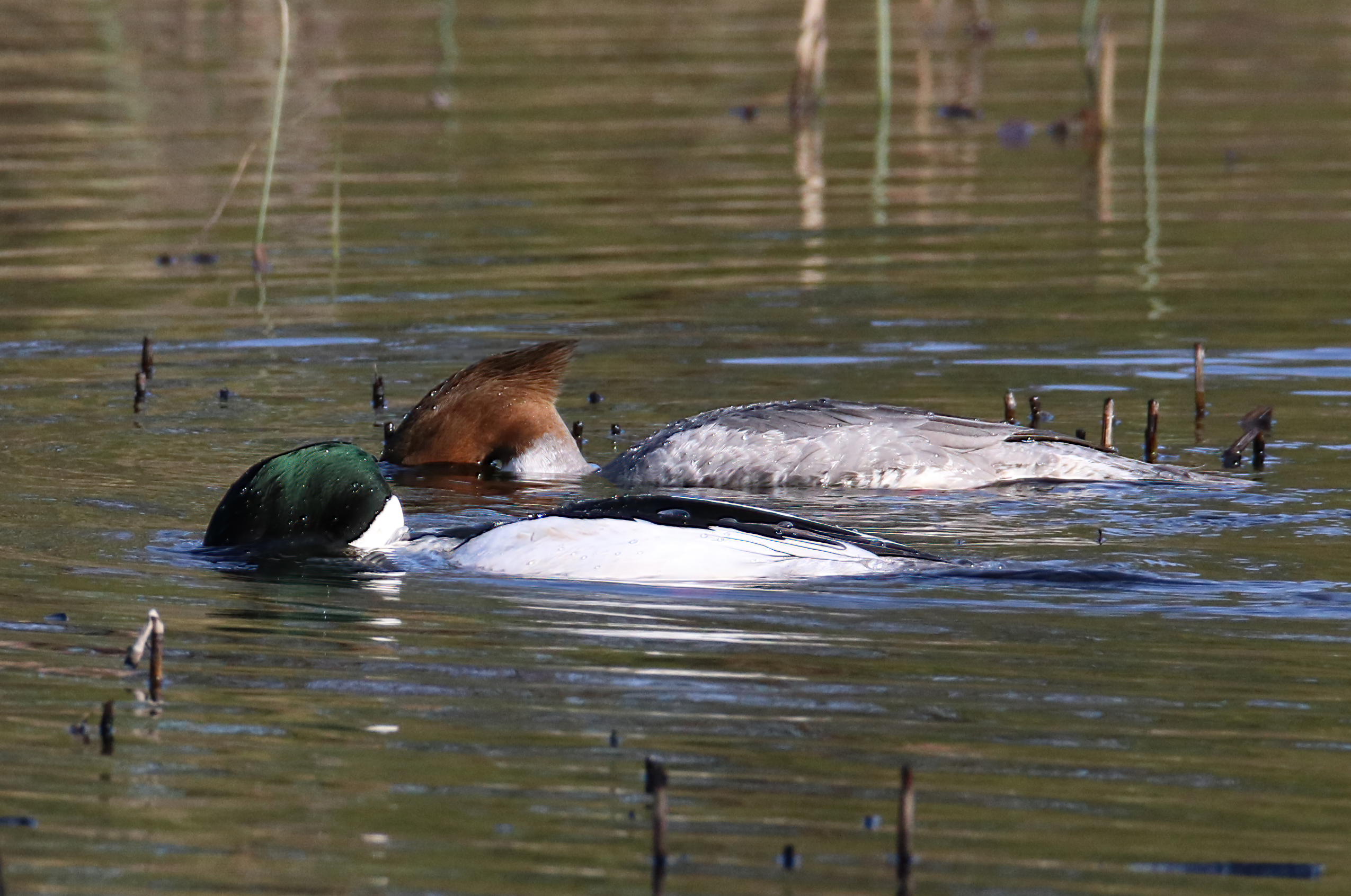
Goosander, Oulu

== Pheasants, grouse, and allies ==
Order: Galliformes Family: Phasianidae

These are terrestrial species of gamebirds, feeding and nesting on the ground. They are variable in size but generally plump, with broad and relatively short wings.

- Hazel grouse (pyy), Tetrastes bonasia
- Willow ptarmigan (riekko), Lagopus lagopus
- Rock ptarmigan (kiiruna), Lagopus muta
- Western capercaillie (metso), Tetrao urogallus
- Black grouse (teeri), Lyrurus tetrix
- Grey partridge (peltopyy), Perdix perdix
- Common pheasant (fasaani), Phasianus colchicus (I)
- Common quail (viiriäinen), Coturnix coturnix

== Grebes ==
Order: Podicipediformes Family: Podicipedidae

Grebes are small to medium-large freshwater diving birds. They have lobed toes and are excellent swimmers and divers. However, they have their feet placed far back on the body, making them quite ungainly on land.

- Little grebe (pikku-uikku), Tachybaptus ruficollis
- Slavonian grebe (mustakurkku-uikku), Podiceps auritus
- Red-necked grebe (härkälintu), Podiceps grisegena
- Great crested grebe (silkkiuikku), Podiceps cristatus
- Black-necked grebe (mustakaulauikku), Podiceps nigricollis (A)

== Pigeons and doves ==
Order: Columbiformes Family: Columbidae

Pigeons and doves are stout-bodied birds with short necks and short slender bills with a fleshy cere.

- Rock dove (kalliokyyhky), Columba livia (I)
- Stock dove (uuttukyyhky), Columba oenas
- Common wood pigeon (sepelkyyhky), Columba palumbus
- European turtle dove (turturikyyhky), Streptopelia turtur
- Oriental turtle dove (idänturturikyyhky), Streptopelia orientalis (A)
- Eurasian collared dove (turkinkyyhky), Streptopelia decaocto

== Sandgrouse ==
Order: Pterocliformes Family: Pteroclidae

Sandgrouse have small pigeon-like heads and necks, but sturdy compact bodies. They have long pointed wings and sometimes tails and a fast direct flight. Flocks fly to watering holes at dawn and dusk. Their legs are feathered down to the toes.

- Pallas's sandgrouse (arokyyhky), Syrrhaptes paradoxus (A)

== Bustards ==
Order: Otidiformes Family: Otididae

Bustards are large terrestrial birds mainly associated with dry open country and steppes in the Old World. They are omnivorous and nest on the ground. They walk steadily on strong legs and big toes, pecking for food as they go. They have long broad wings with "fingered" wingtips and striking patterns in flight. Many have interesting mating displays.

- Great bustard (isotrappi), Otis tarda (A) (H)
- MacQueen's bustard (idänkaulustrappi), Chlamydotis macqueenii (A) (H)
- Little bustard (pikkutrappi), Tetrax tetrax (A)

== Cuckoos ==
Order: Cuculiformes Family: Cuculidae

The family Cuculidae includes cuckoos, roadrunners, and anis. These birds are of variable size with slender bodies, long tails, and strong legs. The Old World cuckoos are brood parasites.

- Great spotted cuckoo (harakkakäki), Clamator glandarius (A)
- Himalayan cuckoo (kiinanidänkäki), Cuculus saturatus (A)
- Common cuckoo (käki), Cuculus canorus
- Oriental cuckoo (idänkäki), Cuculus optatus (A)

== Nightjars and allies ==
Order: Caprimulgiformes Family: Caprimulgidae

Nightjars are medium-sized nocturnal birds that usually nest on the ground. They have long wings, short legs, and very short bills. Most have small feet, of little use for walking, and long pointed wings. Their soft plumage is camouflaged to resemble bark or leaves.

- Eurasian nightjar (kehrääjä), Caprimulgus europaeus

== Swifts ==
Order: Caprimulgiformes Family: Apodidae

Swifts are small birds which spend the majority of their lives flying. These birds have very short legs and never settle voluntarily on the ground, perching instead only on vertical surfaces. Many swifts have long swept-back wings which resemble a crescent or boomerang.

- White-throated needletail (piikkipyrstökiitäjä), Hirundapus caudacutus (A)
- Alpine swift (alppikiitäjä), Apus melba (A)
- Common swift (tervapääsky), Apus apus
- Pallid swift (vaaleakiitäjä), Apus pallidus (A)
- White-rumped swift (häätökiitäjä), Apus caffer (A)

== Rails, gallinules, and coots ==
Order: Gruiformes Family: Rallidae

Rallidae is a large family of small to medium-sized birds which includes the rails, crakes, coots, and gallinules. Typically they inhabit dense vegetation in damp environments near lakes, swamps, or rivers. They are generally shy and secretive birds making them difficult to observe, but some are bold and conspicuous. Most species have strong legs and long toes which are well adapted to soft uneven surfaces. They tend to have short, rounded wings and appear to be weak fliers, though many are capable of long-distance migration and dispersal.

- Water rail (luhtakana), Rallus aquaticus
- Corn crake (ruisrääkkä), Crex crex
- Spotted crake (luhtahuitti), Porzana porzana
- Eurasian moorhen (liejukana), Gallinula chloropus
- Eurasian coot (nokikana), Fulica atra
- Allen's gallinule (kurnuliejukana), Porphyrio alleni (A)
- Little crake (pikkuhuitti), Zapornia parva
- Baillon's crake (kääpiöhuitti), Zapornia pusilla (A)

== Cranes ==
Order: Gruiformes Family: Gruidae

Cranes are large, long-legged, and long-necked birds. Unlike the similar-looking but unrelated herons, cranes fly with necks outstretched, not pulled back. Most have elaborate and noisy courting displays or "dances".

- Demoiselle crane (neitokurki), Anthropoides virgo (A)
- Sandhill crane (hietakurki), Antigone canadensis (A)
- Common crane (kurki), Grus grus

== Stone-curlews ==
Order: Charadriiformes Family: Burhinidae

The stone-curlews are a group of waders found worldwide within the tropical zone, with some species also breeding in temperate Europe and Australia. They are medium to large waders with strong black or yellow-black bills, large yellow eyes, and cryptic plumage. Despite being classed as waders, most species have a preference for arid or semi-arid habitats.

- Eurasian stone-curlew (paksujalka), Burhinus oedicnemus (A)

== Stilts and avocets ==
Order: Charadriiformes Family: Recurvirostridae

Recurvirostridae is a family of large wading birds which includes the avocets and stilts. The avocets have long legs and long up-curved bills. The stilts have extremely long legs and long, thin, straight bills.

- Black-winged stilt (pitkäjalka), Himantopus himantopus (A)
- Pied avocet (avosetti), Recurvirostra avosetta

== Oystercatchers ==
Order: Charadriiformes Family: Haematopodidae

The oystercatchers are large and noisy plover-like birds, with strong bills used for smashing or prising open molluscs.

- Eurasian oystercatcher (meriharakka), Haematopus ostralegus

== Plovers and lapwings ==
Order: Charadriiformes Family: Charadriidae

The family Charadriidae includes the plovers, dotterels, and lapwings. They are small to medium-sized birds with compact bodies, short thick necks, and long, usually pointed, wings. They are found in open country worldwide, mostly in habitats near water.

- Grey plover (tundrakurmitsa), Pluvialis squatarola
- European golden plover (kapustarinta), Pluvialis apricaria
- American golden plover (amerikankurmitsa), Pluvialis dominica (A)
- Pacific golden plover (siperiankurmitsa), Pluvialis fulva (A)
- Northern lapwing (töyhtöhyyppä), Vanellus vanellus
- Sociable lapwing (arohyyppä), Vanellus gregarius (A)
- White-tailed lapwing (suohyyppä), Vanellus leucurus (A)
- Lesser sand plover (ylänkötylli), Charadrius mongolus (A)
- Greater sand plover (aavikkotylli), Charadrius leschenaultii (A)
- Caspian plover (kaspiantylli), Charadrius asiaticus (A)
- Kentish plover (mustajalkatylli), Charadrius alexandrinus (A)
- Common ringed plover (tylli), Charadrius hiaticula
- Little ringed plover (pikkutylli), Charadrius dubius
- Oriental plover (gobintylli), Charadrius veredus (A)
- Eurasian dotterel (keräkurmitsa), Charadrius morinellus

== Sandpipers and allies ==
Order: Charadriiformes Family: Scolopacidae

Scolopacidae is a large diverse family of small to medium-sized shorebirds including sandpipers, curlews, godwits, shanks, tattlers, woodcocks, snipes, dowitchers, and phalaropes. The majority of these species eat small invertebrates picked out of the mud or soil. Variation in length of legs and bills enables multiple species to feed in the same habitat, particularly on the coast, without direct competition for food.

- Upland sandpiper (preeriakahlaaja), Bartramia longicauda (A)
- Eurasian whimbrel (pikkukuovi), Numenius phaeopus
- Little curlew (taigakuovi), Numenius minutus (A)
- Eurasian curlew (kuovi), Numenius arquata
- Bar-tailed godwit (punakuiri), Limosa lapponica
- Black-tailed godwit (mustapyrstökuiri), Limosa limosa
- Ruddy turnstone (karikukko), Arenaria interpres
- Great knot (vuorisirri), Calidris tenuirostris (A)
- Red knot (isosirri), Calidris canutus
- Ruff (suokukko), Calidris pugnax
- Broad-billed sandpiper (jänkäsirriäinen), Calidris falcinellus
- Sharp-tailed sandpiper (suippopyrstösirri), Calidris acuminata (A)
- Stilt sandpiper (pitkäkoipisirri), Calidris himantopus (A)
- Curlew sandpiper (kuovisirri), Calidris ferruginea
- Temminck's stint (lapinsirri), Calidris temminckii
- Long-toed stint (siperiansirri), Calidris subminuta (A)
- Red-necked stint (rusokaulasirri), Calidris ruficollis (A)
- Sanderling (pulmussirri), Calidris alba
- Dunlin (suosirri), Calidris alpina
- Purple sandpiper (merisirri), Calidris maritima
- Baird's sandpiper (eskimosirri), Calidris bairdii (A)
- Little stint (pikkusirri), Calidris minuta
- Least sandpiper (amerikansirri), Calidris minutilla (A) (H)
- White-rumped sandpiper (valkoperäsirri), Calidris fuscicollis (A)
- Buff-breasted sandpiper (tundravikla), Calidris subruficollis (A)
- Pectoral sandpiper (palsasirri), Calidris melanotos
- Long-billed dowitcher (tundrakurppelo), Limnodromus scolopaceus (A)
- Jack snipe (jänkäkurppa), Lymnocryptes minimus
- Eurasian woodcock (lehtokurppa), Scolopax rusticola
- Great snipe (heinäkurppa), Gallinago media
- Common snipe (taivaanvuohi), Gallinago gallinago
- Wilson's snipe (amerikantaivaanvuohi), Gallinago delicata (A)
- Swinhoe's snipe (siperiankurppa), Gallinago megala (A)
- Terek sandpiper (rantakurvi), Xenus cinereus
- Wilson's phalarope (amerikanvesipääsky), Phalaropus tricolor (A)
- Red-necked phalarope (vesipääsky), Phalaropus lobatus
- Red phalarope (isovesipääsky), Phalaropus fulicarius
- Common sandpiper (rantasipi), Actitis hypoleucos
- Spotted sandpiper (amerikansipi), Actitis macularius (A)
- Green sandpiper (metsäviklo), Tringa ochropus
- Spotted redshank (mustaviklo), Tringa erythropus
- Common greenshank (valkoviklo), Tringa nebularia
- Willet (preeriaviklo), Tringa semipalmata (A)
- Lesser yellowlegs (keltajalkaviklo), Tringa flavipes (A)
- Marsh sandpiper (lampiviklo), Tringa stagnatilis
- Wood sandpiper (liro), Tringa glareola
- Common redshank (punajalkaviklo), Tringa totanus

== Pratincoles and coursers ==
Order: Charadriiformes Family: Glareolidae

Glareolidae is a family of wading birds comprising the pratincoles, which have short legs, long pointed wings, and long forked tails, and the coursers, which have long legs, short wings, and long, pointed bills that curve downwards.

- Cream-coloured courser (aavikkojuoksija), Cursorius cursor (A)
- Collared pratincole (pääskykahlaaja), Glareola pratincola (A)
- Oriental pratincole (aasianpääskykahlaaja), Glareola maldivarum (A)
- Black-winged pratincole (aropääskykahlaaja), Glareola nordmanni (A)

== Skuas ==
Order: Charadriiformes Family: Stercorariidae

The family Stercorariidae are, in general, medium to large sea birds, typically with grey or brown plumage, often with white markings on the wings. They nest on the ground in subarctic and arctic regions, and some are long-distance migrants.

- Great skua (isokihu), Stercorarius skua (A)
- Pomarine skua (leveäpyrstökihu), Stercorarius pomarinus
- Arctic skua (merikihu), Stercorarius parasiticus
- Long-tailed skua (tunturikihu), Stercorarius longicaudus

== Auks, guillemots, and puffins ==
Order: Charadriiformes Family: Alcidae

Alcidae is a family of seabirds which are superficially similar to penguins with their black-and-white plumage, their upright posture, and some of their habits, but which are able to fly.

- Little auk (pikkuruokki), Alle alle
- Common Guillemot (etelänkiisla), Uria aalge
- Brünnich's Guillemot (pohjankiisla), Uria lomvia (A)
- Razorbill (ruokki), Alca torda
- Black guillemot (riskilä), Cepphus grylle
- Ancient murrelet (mustakurkkumurri), Synthliboramphus antiquus
- Atlantic puffin (lunni), Fratercula arctica (A)

== Gulls, terns, and skimmers ==
Order: Charadriiformes Family: Laridae

Laridae is a family of medium to large seabirds and includes gulls, terns, and skimmers. Gulls are typically grey or white, often with black markings on the head or wings. They have stout, longish, bills and webbed feet. Terns are a group of generally medium to large seabirds typically with grey or white plumage, often with black markings on the head. Most terns hunt fish by diving but some pick insects off the surface of fresh water. Gulls and terns are generally long-lived birds, with several species known to live in excess of 30 years.

- Black-legged kittiwake (pikkukajava), Rissa tridactyla
- Ivory gull (jäälokki), Pagophila eburnea (A)
- Sabine's gull (tiiralokki), Xema sabini (A)
- Slender-billed gull (kaitanokkalokki), Chroicocephalus genei (A)
- Black-headed gull (naurulokki), Chroicocephalus ridibundus
- Little gull (pikkulokki), Hydrocoloeus minutus
- Ross's gull (ruusulokki), Rhodostethia rosea (A)
- Laughing gull (nokisiipilokki), Leucophaeus atricilla (A)
- Franklin's gull (preerianaurulokki), Leucophaeus pipixcan (A)
- Mediterranean gull (mustanmerenlokki), Ichthyaetus melanocephalus (A)
- Audouin's gull (välimerenlokki), Ichthyaetus audouinii (A)
- Common gull (kalalokki), Larus canus
- European herring gull (harmaalokki), Larus argentatus
- Yellow-legged gull (etelänharmaalokki), Larus michahellis (A)
- Caspian gull (aroharmaalokki), Larus cachinnans
- Iceland gull (grönlanninlokki), Larus glaucoides (A)
- Lesser black-backed gull (selkälokki), Larus fuscus
- Slaty-backed gull (ohotanlokki), Larus schistisagus (A)
- Glaucous gull (isolokki), Larus hyperboreus
- Great black-backed gull (merilokki), Larus marinus
- Little tern (pikkutiira), Sternula albifrons
- Gull-billed tern (hietatiira), Gelochelidon nilotica (A)
- Caspian tern (räyskä), Hydroprogne caspia
- Black tern (mustatiira), Chlidonias niger
- White-winged tern (valkosiipitiira), Chlidonias leucopterus
- Whiskered tern (valkoposkitiira), Chlidonias hybrida (A)
- Common tern (kalatiira), Sterna hirundo
- Arctic tern (lapintiira), Sterna paradisaea
- Sandwich tern (riuttatiira), Thalasseus sandvicensis

== Divers ==
Order: Gaviiformes Family: Gaviidae

Divers are a group of aquatic birds found in many parts of North America and Northern Europe. They are the size of a large duck or small goose, which they somewhat resemble in shape when swimming, but to which they are completely unrelated. In particular, their legs are set very far back which assists in swimming underwater but makes walking on land extremely difficult.

- Red-throated Diver (kaakkuri), Gavia stellata
- Black-throated Diver (kuikka), Gavia arctica
- Pacific Diver (tundrakuikka), Gavia pacifica (A)
- Great Northern Diver (amerikanjääkuikka), Gavia immer
- White-billed Diver (jääkuikka), Gavia adamsii

== Northern storm petrels ==
Order: Procellariiformes Family: Hydrobatidae

Though the members of this family are similar in many respects to the southern storm petrels, including their general appearance and habits, there are enough genetic differences to warrant their placement in a separate family.

- European storm petrel (merikeiju), Hydrobates pelagicus (A)
- Leach's storm petrel (myrskykeiju), Hydrobates leucorhous (A)
- Band-rumped storm petrel (madeirankeiju), Hydrobates castro (A)

== Shearwaters and petrels ==
Order: Procellariiformes Family: Procellariidae

The procellariids are the main group of medium-sized shearwaters and petrels, characterised by united nostrils with medium septum and a long outer functional primary.

- Northern fulmar (myrskylintu), Fulmarus glacialis (A)
- Great shearwater (isoliitäjä), Ardenna gravis (A)
- Sooty shearwater (nokiliitäjä), Ardenna griseus (A)
- Manx shearwater (pikkuliitäjä), Puffinus puffinus (A)

== Storks ==
Order: Ciconiiformes Family: Ciconiidae

Storks are large, long-legged, long-necked, wading birds with long, stout bills. Storks are mute, but bill-clattering is an important mode of communication at the nest. Their nests can be large and may be reused for many years. Many species are migratory.

- Black stork (mustahaikara), Ciconia nigra
- White stork (kattohaikara), Ciconia ciconia

== Gannets ==
Order: Suliformes Family: Sulidae

The sulids comprise the gannets and boobies. Both groups are medium-large coastal seabirds that plunge-dive for fish.

- Brown booby (ruskosuula), Sula leucogaster (A)
- Northern gannet (suula), Morus bassanus (A)

== Cormorants and shags ==
Order: Suliformes Family: Phalacrocoracidae

Cormorants and shags are medium-to-large aquatic birds, usually with mainly dark plumage and areas of coloured skin on the face. The bill is long, thin and sharply hooked. Their feet are four-toed and webbed.

- Pygmy cormorant (pikkumerimetso), Microcarbo pygmaeus (A)
- Great cormorant (merimetso), Phalacrocorax carbo
- European shag (karimetso), Gulosus aristotelis (A)

== Pelicans ==
Order: Pelecaniformes Family: Pelecanidae

Pelicans are very large water birds with a distinctive pouch under their beak. Like other birds in the order Pelecaniformes, they have four webbed toes.

- Great white pelican (pelikaani), Pelecanus onocrotalus (A) (H)

== Herons, egrets, and bitterns ==
Order: Pelecaniformes Family: Ardeidae

The family Ardeidae contains the herons, egrets, and bitterns. Herons and egrets are medium to large wading birds with long necks and legs. Bitterns tend to be shorter-necked and more secretive. Members of Ardeidae fly with their necks retracted, unlike other long-necked birds such as storks, ibises and spoonbills.

- Great bittern (kaulushaikara), Botaurus stellaris
- Little bittern (pikkuhaikara), Ixobrychus minutus (A)
- Grey heron (harmaahaikara), Ardea cinerea
- Purple heron (ruskohaikara), Ardea purpurea (A)
- Great egret (jalohaikara), Egretta alba
- Little egret (silkkihaikara), Egretta garzetta (A)
- Cattle egret (lehmähaikara), Bubulcus ibis (A)
- Squacco heron (rääkkähaikara), Ardeola ralloides (A)
- Indian pond heron (intianriisihaikara), Ardeola grayii (A)
- Black-crowned night heron (yöhaikara), Nycticorax nycticorax (A)

== Ibises and spoonbills ==
Order: Pelecaniformes Family: Threskiornithidae

The family Threskiornithidae includes the ibises and spoonbills. They have long, broad wings. Their bodies tend to be elongated, the neck more so, with rather long legs. The bill is also long, decurved in the case of the ibises, straight and distinctively flattened in the spoonbills.

- Glossy ibis (pronssi-iibis), Plegadis falcinellus (A)
- Eurasian spoonbill (kapustahaikara), Platalea leucorodia (A)

== Osprey ==
Order: Accipitriformes Family: Pandionidae

Pandionidae is a family of fish-eating birds of prey, possessing a very large, powerful hooked beak for tearing flesh from their prey, strong legs, powerful talons, and keen eyesight. The family is monotypic.

- Osprey (sääksi), Pandion haliaetus

== Hawks, eagles, and kites ==
Order: Accipitriformes Family: Accipitridae

Accipitridae is a family of birds of prey and includes hawks, eagles, kites, harriers, and Old World vultures. These birds have very large powerful hooked beaks for tearing flesh from their prey, strong legs, powerful talons, and keen eyesight.

- Egyptian vulture (pikkukorppikotka), Neophron percnopterus (A)
- European honey buzzard (mehiläishaukka), Pernis apivorus
- Oriental honey buzzard (idänmehiläishaukka), Pernis ptilorhynchus (A)
- Black vulture (munkkikorppikotka), Aegypius monachus (A)
- Griffon vulture (hanhikorppikotka), Gyps fulvus (A)
- Short-toed snake eagle (käärmekotka), Circaetus gallicus
- Lesser spotted eagle (pikkukiljukotka), Clanga pomarina
- Greater spotted eagle (kiljukotka), Clanga clanga
- Booted eagle (pikkukotka), Hieraaetus pennatus (A)
- Steppe eagle (arokotka), Aquila nipalensis (A)
- Imperial eagle (keisarikotka), Aquila heliaca (A)
- Golden eagle (maakotka), Aquila chrysaetos
- Western marsh harrier (ruskosuohaukka), Circus aeruginosus
- Hen harrier (sinisuohaukka), Circus cyaneus
- Pallid harrier (arosuohaukka), Circus macrourus
- Montagu's harrier (niittysuohaukka), Circus pygargus
- Eurasian sparrowhawk (varpushaukka), Accipiter nisus
- Northern goshawk (kanahaukka), Accipiter gentilis
- Red kite (isohaarahaukka), Milvus milvus (A)
- Black kite (haarahaukka), Milvus migrans
- White-tailed eagle (merikotka), Haliaeetus albicilla
- Pallas's fish eagle (aromerikotka), Haliaeetus leucoryphus (A) (H)
- Rough-legged buzzard (piekana), Buteo lagopus
- Common buzzard (hiirihaukka), Buteo buteo
- Long-legged buzzard (arohiirihaukka), Buteo rufinus (A)

== Barn owls ==
Order: Strigiformes Family: Tytonidae

Barn owls are medium to large owls with large heads and characteristic heart-shaped faces. They have long strong legs with powerful talons.

- Western barn owl, Tyto alba (A)

== Owls ==
Order: Strigiformes Family: Strigidae

Typical owls are small to large solitary nocturnal birds of prey. They have large forward-facing eyes and ears, a hawk-like beak, and a conspicuous circle of feathers around each eye called a facial disk.

- Eurasian scops owl (kyläpöllönen), Otus scops (A)
- Eurasian eagle-owl (huuhkaja), Bubo bubo
- Snowy owl (tunturipöllö), Bubo scandiacus
- Northern hawk owl (hiiripöllö), Surnia ulula
- Eurasian pygmy owl (varpuspöllö), Glaucidium passerinum
- Little owl (minervanpöllö), Athene noctua (A)
- Tawny owl (lehtopöllö), Strix aluco
- Ural owl (viirupöllö), Strix uralensis
- Great grey owl (lapinpöllö), Strix nebulosa
- Long-eared owl (sarvipöllö), Asio otus
- Short-eared owl (suopöllö), Asio flammeus
- Tengmalm's owl (helmipöllö), Aegolius funereus

== Hoopoes ==
Order: Bucerotiformes Family: Upupidae

Hoopoes have black, white and orangey-pink colouring with a large erectile crest on their head.

- Eurasian hoopoe (harjalintu), Upupa epops

== Kingfishers ==
Order: Coraciiformes Family: Alcedinidae

Kingfishers are medium-sized birds with large heads, long, pointed bills, short legs and stubby tails.

- Common kingfisher (kuningaskalastaja), Alcedo atthis

== Bee-eaters ==
Order: Coraciiformes Family: Meropidae

The bee-eaters are a group of coraciiform birds in the family Meropidae. Most species are found in Africa but others occur in southern Europe, Madagascar, Australia and New Guinea. They are characterised by richly coloured plumage, slender bodies and usually elongated central tail feathers. All are colourful and have long downturned bills and pointed wings, which give them a swallow-like appearance when seen from afar.

- Blue-cheeked bee-eater (vihermehiläissyöjä), Merops persicus (A)
- European bee-eater (mehiläissyöjä), Merops apiaster

== Rollers ==
Order: Coraciiformes Family: Coraciidae

Rollers resemble crows in size and build, but are more closely related to the kingfishers and bee-eaters. They share the colourful appearance of those groups with blues and browns predominating. The two inner front toes are connected, but the outer toe is not.

- European roller (sininärhi), Coracias garrulus

== Woodpeckers ==
Order: Piciformes Family: Picidae

Woodpeckers are small to medium-sized birds with chisel-like beaks, short legs, stiff tails and long tongues used for capturing insects. Most species have feet with two toes pointing forward and two backward, while a few species have only three toes. Many woodpeckers habitually tap noisily on tree trunks with their beaks.

- Eurasian wryneck (käenpiika), Jynx torquilla
- Eurasian three-toed woodpecker (pohjantikka), Picoides tridactylus
- Middle spotted woodpecker (tammitikka), Dendrocoptes medius (A)
- White-backed woodpecker (valkoselkätikka), Dendrocopos leucotos
- Great spotted woodpecker (käpytikka), Dendrocopos major
- Lesser spotted woodpecker (pikkutikka), Dryobates minor
- Grey-headed woodpecker (harmaapäätikka), Picus canus
- European green woodpecker (vihertikka), Picus viridis (A)
- Black woodpecker (palokärki), Dryocopus martius

== Falcons and caracaras ==
Order: Falconiformes Family: Falconidae

Falconidae is a family of diurnal birds of prey. They differ from hawks, eagles and kites in that they kill with their beaks instead of their talons.

- Lesser kestrel (pikkutuulihaukka), Falco naumanni (A)
- Eurasian kestrel (tuulihaukka), Falco tinnunculus
- Red-footed falcon (punajalkahaukka), Falco vespertinus
- Eleonora's falcon (välimerenhaukka), Falco eleonorae (A)
- Merlin (ampuhaukka), Falco columbarius
- Eurasian hobby (nuolihaukka), Falco subbuteo
- Saker falcon (aavikkohaukka), Falco cherrug (A)
- Gyrfalcon (tunturihaukka), Falco rusticolus
- Peregrine falcon (muuttohaukka), Falco peregrinus

== Old World orioles ==
Order: Passeriformes Family: Oriolidae

The Old World orioles are colourful passerine birds. They are not related to the New World orioles.

- Eurasian golden oriole (kuhankeittäjä), Oriolus oriolus

== Shrikes ==
Order: Passeriformes Family: Laniidae

Shrikes are passerine birds known for habitually catching other birds and small animals and impaling the uneaten portions of their bodies on thorns. A shrike's beak is hooked, like that of a typical bird of prey.

- Red-backed shrike (pikkulepinkäinen), Lanius collurio
- Red-tailed shrike (ruostepäälepinkäinen), Lanius phoenicuroides (A)
- Isabelline shrike (punapyrstölepinkäinen), Lanius isabellinus (A)
- Brown shrike (siperianlepinkäinen), Lanius cristatus (A)
- Northern shrike (taigaisolepinkäinen), Lanius borealis (A)
- Great grey shrike (isolepinkäinen), Lanius excubitor (A)
- Lesser grey shrike (mustaotsalepinkäinen), Lanius minor (A)
- Masked shrike (valko-otsalepinkäinen), Lanius nubicus (A)
- Woodchat shrike (punapäälepinkäinen), Lanius senator (A)

== Crows, jays, and magpies ==
Order: Passeriformes Family: Corvidae

The family Corvidae includes crows, ravens, jays, choughs, magpies, treepies, nutcrackers, and ground jays. Corvids are above average in size among the Passeriformes, and some of the larger species show high levels of intelligence.

- Siberian jay (kuukkeli), Perisoreus infaustus
- Eurasian jay (närhi), Garrulus glandarius
- Eurasian magpie (harakka), Pica pica
- Eurasian nutcracker (pähkinähakki), Nucifraga caryocatactes
- Eurasian jackdaw (naakka), Corvus monedula
- Daurian jackdaw (idännaakka), Corvus dauuricus (A) (H)
- Rook (mustavaris), Corvus frugilegus
- Carrion crow (nokivaris), Corvus corone (A)
- Hooded crow (varis), Corvus cornix
- Common raven (korppi), Corvus corax

== Tits, chickadees, and titmice ==
Order: Passeriformes Family: Paridae

The Paridae are mainly small stocky woodland species with short stout bills. Some have crests. They are adaptable birds, with a mixed diet including seeds and insects.

- Coal tit (kuusitiainen), Parus ater
- Crested tit (töyhtötiainen), Parus cristatus
- Marsh tit (viitatiainen), Parus palustris (A)
- Willow tit (hömötiainen), Parus montanus
- Siberian tit (lapintiainen), Parus cinctus
- Eurasian blue tit (sinitiainen), Parus caeruleus
- Azure tit (valkopäätiainen), Parus cyanus (A)
- Great tit (talitiainen), Parus major

== Penduline tits ==
Order: Passeriformes Family: Remizidae

The penduline tits are a group of small passerine birds related to the true tits. They are insectivores.

- Eurasian penduline tit (pussitiainen), Remiz pendulinus

== Larks ==
Order: Passeriformes Family: Alaudidae

Larks are small terrestrial birds with often extravagant songs and display flights. Most larks are fairly dull in appearance. Their food is insects and seeds.

- Shore lark (tunturikiuru), Eremophila alpestris
- Greater short-toed lark (lyhytvarvaskiuru), Calandrella brachydactyla
- Bimaculated lark (ylänkökiuru), Melanocorypha bimaculata (A)
- Calandra lark (arokiuru), Melanocorypha calandra (A)
- Black lark (mustakiuru), Melanocorypha yeltoniensis (A)
- Mediterranean short-toed lark (pikkukiuru), Alaudala rufescens (A)
- Turkestan short-toed lark, Alaudala heinei (A)
- Wood lark (kangaskiuru), Lullula arborea
- White-winged lark (valkosiipikiuru), Alauda leucoptera (A)
- Eurasian skylark (kiuru), Alauda arvensis
- Crested lark (töyhtökiuru), Galerida cristata (A)

== Bearded reedling ==
Order: Passeriformes Family: Panuridae

This species, the only one in its family, is found in reed beds throughout temperate Europe and Asia.

- Bearded reedling (viiksitimali), Panurus biarmicus

== Reed warblers and allies ==
Order: Passeriformes Family: Acrocephalidae

The members of this family are rather plain olivaceous brown above with much yellow to beige below. They are usually found in open woodland, reedbeds, or tall grass. The family occurs mostly in southern to western Eurasia and its surroundings, but it also ranges far into the Pacific, with some species in Africa.

- Thick-billed warbler (paksunokkakerttunen), Arundinax aedon (A)
- Booted warbler (pikkukultarinta), Iduna caligata (A)
- Sykes's warbler (aavikkokultarinta), Iduna rama (A)
- Eastern olivaceous warbler (vaaleakultarinta), Iduna pallida (A)
- Icterine warbler (kultarinta), Hippolais icterina
- Aquatic warbler (sarakerttunen), Acrocephalus paludicola (A)
- Sedge warbler (ruokokerttunen), Acrocephalus schoenobaenus
- Paddyfield warbler (kenttäkerttunen), Acrocephalus agricola (A)
- Blyth's reed warbler (viitakerttunen), Acrocephalus dumetorum
- Marsh warbler (luhtakerttunen), Acrocephalus palustris
- Eurasian reed warbler (rytikerttunen), Acrocephalus scirpaceus
- Great reed warbler (rastaskerttunen), Acrocephalus arundinaceus

== Grassbirds and allies ==
Order: Passeriformes Family: Locustellidae

Locustellidae is a family of small insectivorous songbirds found mainly in Eurasia, Africa, and the Australian region. They are smallish birds with tails that are usually long and pointed, and tend to be drab brownish or buffy all over.

- Pallas's grasshopper warbler (sarasirkkalintu), Helopsaltes certhiola (A)
- Lanceolated warbler (viirusirkkalintu), Locustella lanceolata
- River warbler (viitasirkkalintu), Locustella fluviatilis
- Savi's warbler (ruokosirkkalintu), Locustella luscinioides
- Common grasshopper warbler (pensassirkkalintu), Locustella naevia

== Swallows ==
Order: Passeriformes Family: Hirundinidae

The family Hirundinidae is adapted to aerial feeding. They have a slender streamlined body, long pointed wings, and a short bill with a wide gape. The feet are adapted to perching rather than walking, and the front toes are partially joined at the base.

- Bank swallow (törmäpääsky), Riparia riparia
- Eurasian crag martin (kalliopääsky), Ptyonoprogne rupestris (A)
- Barn swallow (haarapääsky), Hirundo rustica
- European red-rumped swallow (ruostepääsky), Hirundo rufula (A)
- Common house martin (räystäspääsky), Delichon urbicum

== Leaf warblers ==
Order: Passeriformes Family: Phylloscopidae

Leaf warblers are a family of small insectivorous birds found mostly in Eurasia and ranging into Wallacea and Africa. The species are of various sizes, often green-plumaged above and yellow below, or more subdued with greyish-green to greyish-brown colours.

- Wood warbler (sirittäjä), Phylloscopus sibilatrix
- Western Bonelli's warbler (vuoriuunilintu), Phylloscopus bonelli (A)
- Eastern Bonelli's warbler (balkaninuunilintu), Phylloscopus orientalis (A)
- Yellow-browed warbler (taigauunilintu), Phylloscopus inornatus
- Hume's warbler (kashmirinuunilintu), Phylloscopus humei (A)
- Pallas's leaf warbler (hippiäisuunilintu), Phylloscopus proregulus
- Radde's warbler (siperianuunilintu), Phylloscopus schwarzi (A)
- Dusky warbler (ruskouunilintu), Phylloscopus fuscatus (A)
- Willow warbler (pajulintu), Phylloscopus trochilus
- Common chiffchaff (tiltaltti), Phylloscopus collybita
- Iberian chiffchaff (iberiantiltaltti), Phylloscopus ibericus (A)
- Eastern crowned warbler (amurinuunilintu), Phylloscopus coronatus (A)
- Green warbler (kaukasianuunilintu), Phylloscopus nitidus (A)
- Greenish warbler (idänuunilintu), Phylloscopus trochiloides
- Two-barred warbler (burjatianuunilintu), Phylloscopus plumbeitarsus (A)
- Arctic warbler (lapinuunilintu), Phylloscopus borealis
- Kamchatka leaf warbler (kamtšatkanuunilintu), Phylloscopus examinandus (A)

== Long-tailed tits ==
Order: Passeriformes Family: Aegithalidae

Long-tailed tits are a group of small passerine birds with medium to long tails. They make bag nests in trees. Most eat a mixed diet which includes insects.

- Long-tailed tit (pyrstötiainen), Aegithalos caudatus

== Sylviid warblers and allies ==
Order: Passeriformes Family: Sylviidae

The family Sylviidae is a group of small insectivorous birds. They mainly occur as breeding species, as another common name (Old World warblers) implies, in Europe, Asia and, to a lesser extent, Africa. Most are of generally undistinguished appearance, but many have distinctive songs.

- Eurasian blackcap (mustapääkerttu), Sylvia atricapilla
- Garden warbler (lehtokerttu), Sylvia borin
- Barred warbler (kirjokerttu), Curruca nisoria
- Lesser whitethroat (hernekerttu), Curruca curruca
- Asian desert warbler (kääpiökerttu), Curruca nana (A)
- Rüppell's warbler (mustakurkkukerttu), Curruca ruppeli (A)
- Sardinian warbler (samettipääkerttu), Curruca melanocephala (A)
- Eastern subalpine warbler (rusorintakerttu), Curruca cantillans (A)
- Greater whitethroat (pensaskerttu), Curruca communis
- Dartford warbler (ruskokerttu), Curruca undata (A)

== Crests ==
Order: Passeriformes Family: Regulidae

The crests and kinglets are a small bird family resembling some warblers. They are very small insectivorous birds in the single genus Regulus. The adults have coloured crowns, giving rise to their name.

- Goldcrest (hippiäinen), Regulus regulus
- Common firecrest (tulipäähippiäinen), Regulus ignicapilla (A)

== Nuthatches ==
Order: Passeriformes Family: Sittidae

Nuthatches are small woodland birds. They have the unusual ability to climb down trees head first, unlike other birds which can only go upwards. Nuthatches have big heads, short tails, and powerful bills and feet.

- Eurasian nuthatch (pähkinänakkeli), Sitta europaea

== Treecreepers ==
Order: Passeriformes Family: Certhiidae

Treecreepers are small woodland birds, brown above and white below. They have thin pointed down-curved bills, which they use to extricate insects from bark. They have stiff tail feathers, like woodpeckers, which they use to support themselves on vertical trees.

- Eurasian treecreeper (puukiipijä), Certhia familiaris
- Short-toed treecreeper (etelänpuukiipijä), Certhia brachydactyla (A)

== Wrens ==
Order: Passeriformes Family: Troglodytidae

The wrens are mainly small and inconspicuous except for their loud songs. These birds have short wings and thin down-turned bills. Several species often hold their tails upright. All are insectivorous.

- Eurasian wren (peukaloinen), Troglodytes troglodytes

== Dippers ==
Order: Passeriformes Family: Cinclidae

Dippers are a group of perching birds whose habitat includes aquatic environments in the Americas, Europe, and Asia. They are named for their bobbing or dipping movements.

- White-throated dipper (koskikara), Cinclus cinclus

== Starlings ==
Order: Passeriformes Family: Sturnidae

Starlings are small to medium-sized passerine birds. Their flight is strong and direct and they are very gregarious. Their preferred habitat is fairly open country. They eat insects and fruit. Their plumage is typically dark with a metallic sheen.

- Common starling (kottarainen), Sturnus vulgaris
- Rosy starling (punakottarainen), Pastor roseus

== Thrushes and allies ==
Order: Passeriformes Family: Turdidae

The thrushes are a family of birds that occur mainly in the Old World. They are plump, soft-plumaged, small-to-medium-sized insectivores or sometimes omnivores, often feeding on the ground. Many have attractive songs.

- White's thrush (kirjorastas), Zoothera aurea (A)
- Scaly thrush (suomurastas), Zoothera dauma (A)
- Swainson's thrush (korpirastas), Catharus ustulatus (A)
- Mistle thrush (kulorastas), Turdus viscivorus
- Song thrush (laulurastas), Turdus philomelos
- Redwing (punakylkirastas), Turdus iliacus
- Common blackbird (mustarastas), Turdus merula
- Eyebrowed thrush (harmaakurkkurastas), Turdus obscurus (A)
- Fieldfare (räkättirastas), Turdus pilaris
- Ring ouzel (sepelrastas), Turdus torquatus
- Black-throated thrush (mustakaularastas), Turdus atrogularis (A)
- Dusky thrush (ruostesiipirastas), Turdus eunomus (A)
- Naumann's thrush (ruosterastas), Turdus naumanni (A)

== Old World flycatchers ==
Order: Passeriformes Family: Muscicapidae

Old World flycatchers are a large group of birds which are mainly small arboreal insectivores. The appearance of these birds is highly varied; some have weak songs and harsh calls, while others have among the most complex and musical songs of all birds.

- Spotted flycatcher (harmaasieppo), Muscicapa striata
- Rufous-tailed scrub robin (ruostepyrstö), Cercotrichas galactotes (A)
- European robin (punarinta), Erithacus rubecula
- White-throated robin (kivikkosatakieli), Irania gutturalis (A)
- Thrush nightingale (satakieli), Luscinia luscinia
- Common nightingale (etelänsatakieli), Luscinia megarhynchos (A)
- Bluethroat (sinirinta), Luscinia svecica
- Siberian rubythroat (rubiinisatakieli), Calliope calliope (A)
- Red-flanked bluetail (sinipyrstö), Tarsiger cyanurus
- Taiga flycatcher (idänpikkusieppo), Ficedula albicilla (A)
- Red-breasted flycatcher (pikkusieppo), Ficedula parva
- European pied flycatcher (kirjosieppo), Ficedula hypoleuca
- Collared flycatcher (sepelsieppo), Ficedula albicollis
- Common redstart (leppälintu), Phoenicurus phoenicurus
- Black redstart (mustaleppälintu), Phoenicurus ochruros
- Common rock thrush (kivikkorastas), Monticola saxatilis (A)
- Blue rock thrush (sinirastas), Monticola solitarius (A)
- Whinchat (pensastasku), Saxicola rubetra
- European stonechat (mustapäätasku), Saxicola torquatus
- Siberian stonechat (sepeltasku), Saxicola maurus (A)
- Amur stonechat, Saxicola stejnegeri (A)
- Pied bushchat (nokitasku), Saxicola caprata (A)
- Northern wheatear (kivitasku), Oenanthe oenanthe
- Isabelline wheatear (arotasku), Oenanthe isabellina (A)
- Desert wheatear (aavikkotasku), Oenanthe deserti (A)
- Western black-eared wheatear (rusotasku), Oenanthe hispanica (A)
- Eastern black-eared wheatear, Oenanthe melanoleuca (A)
- Pied wheatear (nunnatasku), Oenanthe pleschanka (A)

== Waxwings ==
Order: Passeriformes Family: Bombycillidae

The waxwings are a group of birds with soft silky plumage and unique red tips to some of the wing feathers. In the Bohemian and cedar waxwings, these tips look like sealing wax and give the group its name. These are arboreal birds of northern forests. They live on insects in summer and berries in winter.

- Bohemian waxwing (tilhi), Bombycilla garrulus
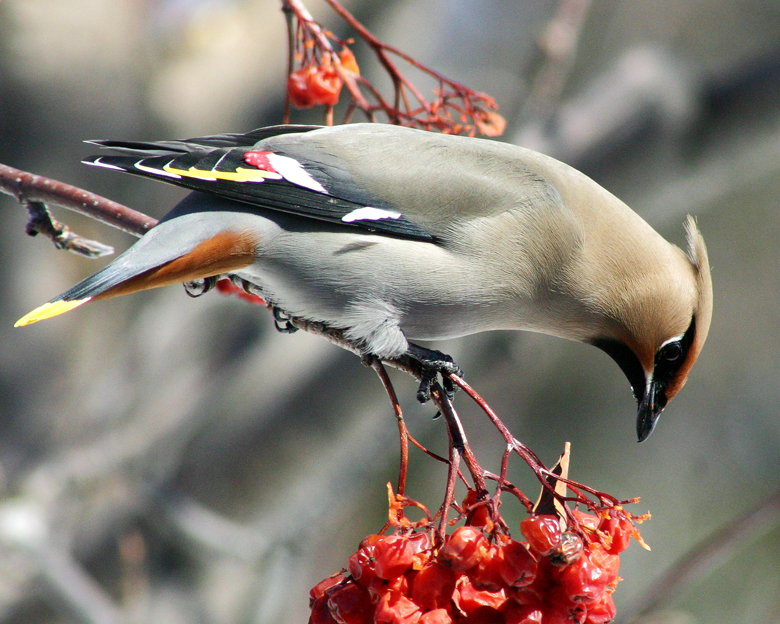
Bohemian waxwing

== Accentors ==
Order: Passeriformes Family: Prunellidae

The accentors are the only bird family which is endemic to the Palearctic. They are small, fairly drab species superficially similar to sparrows.

- Alpine accentor (alppirautiainen), Prunella collaris (A)
- Siberian accentor (taigarautiainen), Prunella montanella (A)
- Black-throated accentor (mustakurkkurautiainen), Prunella atrogularis (A)
- Dunnock (rautiainen), Prunella modularis

== Old World sparrows ==
Order: Passeriformes Family: Passeridae

In general, Old World sparrows tend to be small, plump, brown or grey birds with short tails and short powerful beaks. Sparrows are seed eaters, but they also consume small insects.

- House sparrow (varpunen), Passer domesticus
- Spanish sparrow (pensasvarpunen), Passer hispaniolensis (A)
- Tree sparrow (pikkuvarpunen), Passer montanus

== Wagtails and pipits ==
Order: Passeriformes Family: Motacillidae

Motacillidae is a family of small birds with medium to long tails which includes the wagtails, longclaws, and pipits. They are slender ground-feeding insectivores of open country.

- Grey wagtail (virtavästäräkki), Motacilla cinerea
- Western yellow wagtail (keltavästäräkki), Motacilla flava
- Citrine wagtail (sitruunavästäräkki), Motacilla citreola
- White wagtail (västäräkki), Motacilla alba
- Richard's pipit (isokirvinen), Anthus richardi
- Blyth's pipit (mongoliankirvinen), Anthus godlewskii (A)
- Tawny pipit (nummikirvinen), Anthus campestris
- Meadow pipit (niittykirvinen), Anthus pratensis
- Tree pipit (metsäkirvinen), Anthus trivialis
- Olive-backed pipit (taigakirvinen), Anthus hodgsoni (A)
- Pechora pipit (tundrakirvinen), Anthus gustavi (A)
- Red-throated pipit (lapinkirvinen), Anthus cervinus
- Water pipit (vuorikirvinen), Anthus spinoletta (A)
- Rock pipit (luotokirvinen), Anthus petrosus
- American pipit (tuhkakirvinen), Anthus rubescens (A)

== Finches, euphonias, and allies ==
Order: Passeriformes Family: Fringillidae

Finches are seed-eating birds that are small to moderately large and have a strong beak, usually conical and in some species very large. All have twelve tail feathers and nine primaries. These birds have a bouncing flight with alternating bouts of flapping and gliding on closed wings, and most sing well.

- Common chaffinch (peippo), Fringilla coelebs
- Brambling (järripeippo), Fringilla montifringilla
- Hawfinch (nokkavarpunen), Coccothraustes coccothraustes
- Common rosefinch (punavarpunen), Carpodacus erythrinus
- Pine grosbeak (taviokuurna), Pinicola enucleator
- Eurasian bullfinch (punatulkku), Pyrrhula pyrrhula
- Trumpeter finch (aavikkotulkku), Bucanetes githagineus (A)
- European greenfinch (viherpeippo), Chloris chloris
- Twite (vuorihemppo), Linaria flavirostris
- Common linnet (hemppo), Linaria cannabina
- Common redpoll (urpiainen), Acanthis flammea
- Lesser redpoll (ruskourpiainen), Acanthis cabaret
- Arctic redpoll (tundraurpiainen), Acanthis hornemanni
- Parrot crossbill (isokäpylintu), Loxia pytyopsittacus
- Common crossbill (pikkukäpylintu), Loxia curvirostra
- White-winged crossbill (kirjosiipikäpylintu), Loxia leucoptera
- European goldfinch (tikli), Carduelis carduelis
- Citril finch (sitruunahemppo), Carduelis citrinella (A)
- European serin (keltahemppo), Serinus serinus
- Eurasian siskin (vihervarpunen), Spinus spinus

== Longspurs and snow buntings ==
Order: Passeriformes Family: Calcariidae

The Calcariidae are a family of birds that had been traditionally grouped with the buntings but differ in a number of respects and are usually found in open grassy areas.

- Lapland longspur (lapinsirkku), Calcarius lapponicus
- Snow bunting (pulmunen), Plectrophenax nivalis
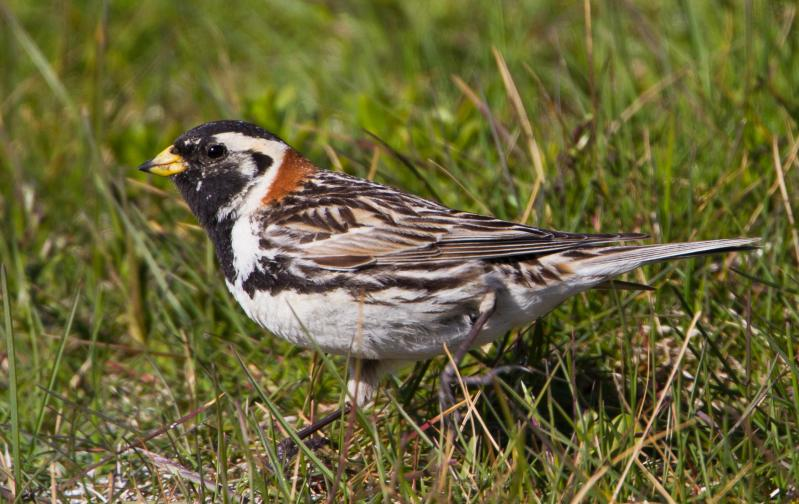
Lapland longspur

== Old World buntings ==
Order: Passeriformes Family: Emberizidae

The buntings are a family of passerine birds containing a single genus. Until 2017, the New World sparrows (Passerellidae) were also considered part of this family.

- Black-headed bunting (mustapääsirkku), Emberiza melanocephala (A)
- Red-headed bunting (ruskopääsirkku), Emberiza bruniceps (A)
- Corn bunting (harmaasirkku), Emberiza calandra (A)
- Yellowhammer (keltasirkku), Emberiza citrinella
- Pine bunting (mäntysirkku), Emberiza leucocephalos (A)
- Grey-necked bunting (kivikkosirkku), Emberiza buchanani (A)
- Ortolan bunting (peltosirkku), Emberiza hortulana
- Cretzschmar's bunting (ruostekurkkusirkku), Emberiza caesia (A)
- Pallas's bunting (pikkupajusirkku), Emberiza pallasi (A)
- Reed bunting (pajusirkku), Emberiza schoeniclus
- Yellow-breasted bunting (kultasirkku), Emberiza aureola
- Little bunting (pikkusirkku), Emberiza pusilla
- Rustic bunting (pohjansirkku), Emberiza rustica
- Black-faced bunting (harmaapääsirkku), Emberiza spodocephala (A)
- Chestnut bunting (kastanjasirkku), Emberiza rutila (A)
- Yellow-browed bunting (kultakulmasirkku), Emberiza chrysophrys (A)

== New World sparrows ==
Order: Passeriformes Family: Passerellidae

Until 2017, these species were considered part of the family Emberizidae. Most of the species are known as sparrows, but these birds are not closely related to the Old World sparrows which are in the family Passeridae. Many of these have distinctive head patterns.

- Dark-eyed junco (tummajunkko), Junco hyemalis (A)
- Fox sparrow (kettusirkku), Passerella iliaca (A)
- White-throated sparrow (valkokurkkusirkku), Zonotrichia albicollis (A)

== New World warblers ==
Order: Passeriformes Family: Parulidae

Parulidae are a group of small, often colourful birds restricted to the New World. Most are arboreal and insectivorous.

- Blackpoll warbler (viirukerttuli), Setophaga striata (A)

== See also ==
- List of birds
- Lists of birds by region
- Fauna of Finland
