= Anja Vammelvuo =

Finnish poet and writer

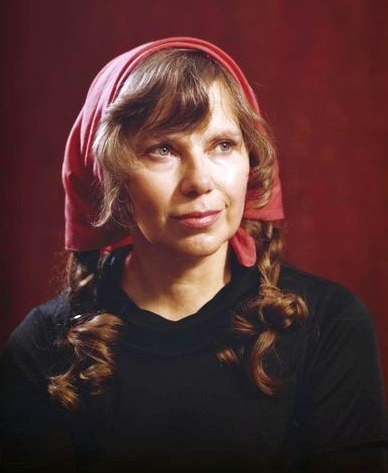
Anja Leila Hemmikki Vammelvuo

Anja Leila Hemmikki Vammelvuo (7 October 1921 in Hausjärvi – 30 June 1988 in Tuusula) was a Finnish poet and writer. She was awarded the State Prize for Literature in 1949, 1954, and 1970, and the Pro Finlandia medal in 1969.
