= Axel Gabriel Sjöström =

Finnish educator and poet

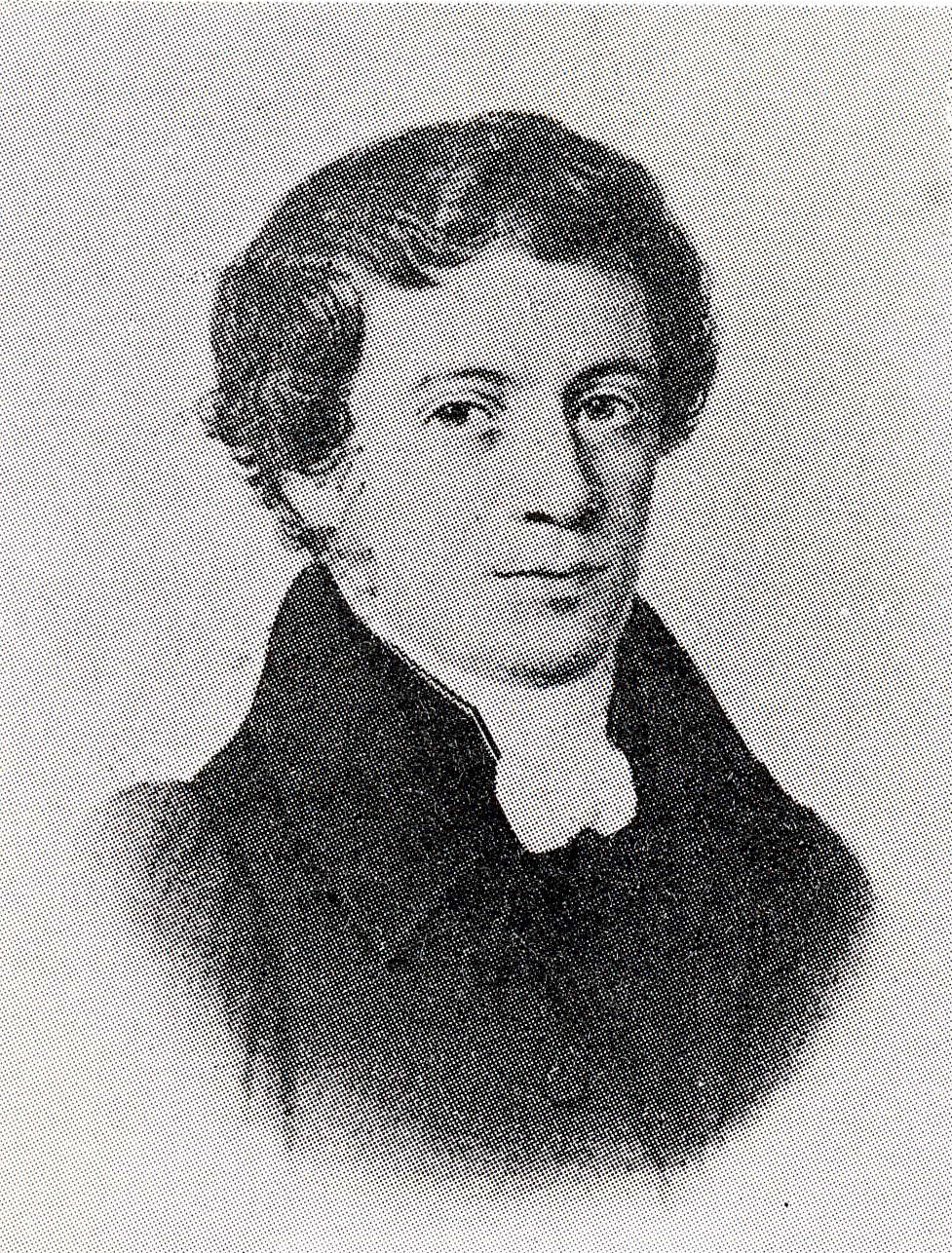
Axel Gabriel Sjöström.

Axel Gabriel Sjöström (16 August 1794 – 11 December 1846) was a Finnish educator and poet.

== Biography ==
He was born in Janakkala, and became professor of Greek Literature at the Imperial Alexander University in Helsinki in 1833. He married Margareta Sofia Helsberg in 1828. During his lifetime a few of his poems earned him a high, but short-lived, reputation in Finnish literary circles. Aside from original poetry, Sjöström also did translations from Greek (Homer, Euripides, Anacreon, Theocritus, and Johan Paulinus-Lillienstedt's Magnus Principatus Finlandia) and German (Goethe and Romantic poets).

== Publications ==
- De poetica facultate Coluniellae (1815)
- Juliets uppvaknande och död (1825)
- Sorgetal öfver Hans Kejserliga Majestet Alexander I, hållet uti Åbo Universitets Solennitets-sal den 4 April 1826 (1826)
- Taflor af vådelden i Åbo. (1827)
- Olympiorum ex Pindaro adunibratio (1832)
- Circa Pindari Pythiorum quartum animadversaria (1845-46)

== Other sources ==
- Schoolfield, George C. A History of Finland's Literature, p. 300. University of Nebraska Press, 1998. ISBN 978-0-8032-4189-3
