= Global Social Mobility Index =

Index of social mobility of the World Economic Forum

The Global Social Mobility Index is an index prepared by the World Economic Forum. The inaugural index from 2020 ranked 82 countries and has not been updated since. The Index measures social mobility holistically through 5 determinants. The findings from the index were then used in the World Economic Forum's Global Social Mobility Report 2020, which provided recommendations for governments and businesses. Researchers have used the index to analyze income inequality and have determined reasons for countries to improve social mobility.

== Context ==
The Global Social Mobility Index was established by the World Economic Forum in 2020 in light of the changes caused by globalization and technological advancement. The results and findings of the index are summarized in the Global Social Mobility Report 2020. The index differs from previous measures of social mobility because it uses a more holistic methodology, ultimately measuring the causes of social mobility. Previous measures focused on comparing intergenerational incomes. These comparisons drew data from different time periods, and thus it was more difficult to draw clear conclusions about the present.

== Methodology summary ==
The World Economic Forum measured social mobility through five determinants: health, education, technology, work, and institutions. These five determinants are measured by the following ten pillars, each with its own set of parameters.

Pillar 1: Health

- Adolescent birth rate per 1000 women
- Prevalence of malnourishment (as a percentage of 5-19 year olds)
- Health access and quality index
- Inequality-adjusted healthy life expectancy index

Pillar 2: Education Access

- Pre-primary enrollment (as a percentage)
- Quality of vocational training
- NEET ratio (the percentage of 15-24 year olds not in employment, education, or training)
- Percentage of school-age children that lack access to education
- Inequality-adjusted education index

Pillar 3: Education Quality and Equity

- Children below minimum proficiency
- Pupils per teacher in pre-primary/primary/secondary education
- Harmonized learning outcomes (a metric created by the World Bank that compares learning progress between countries)
- Social diversity in schools
- Percentage of disadvantaged students in schools which report a lack of education material

Pillar 4: Lifelong Learning

- Extent of staff training
- Active labor market policies
- Impact of ICTs (information and communications technology) on access to basic services
- Percentage of firms offering formal training
- Digital skills amongst the adult population

Pillar 5: Technology Access

- Internet users (as a percentage of the adult population)
- Fixed-broadband internet subscriptions (per 100 pop.)
- Mobile-broadband subscriptions (per 100 pop.)
- Percentage of population covered by at least a 3G mobile network
- Percentage of rural population with electricity access
- Internet access in schools

Pillar 6: Work Opportunities

Share in vulnerable employment

- Unemployment among labor force with basic/intermediate/advanced education (as a percentage)
- Unemployment in rural areas (as a percentage)
- Ratio of female to male labor force participation rate
- Workers in vulnerable employment (as a percentage)

Pillar 7: Fair Wage Distribution

- Low pay incidence (as a percentage of workers)
- Ratio of bottom 40% to top 10% labor income share
- Ratio of bottom 50% to top 50% labor income share
- Mean income of bottom 40% (as a percentage of national mean income)
- Adjusted labor income share (as a percentage)

Pillar 8: Working Conditions

- Worker’s rights index
- Cooperation in labor-employer relations
- Pay and productivity
- Employees working more than 48 hours a week
- Collective bargaining coverage ratio (as a percentage)

Pillar 9: Social Protection

- Guaranteed minimum income benefits (as a percentage of median income)
- Social protection coverage (as a percentage of population)
- Social protection spending (as a percentage of GDP)
- Social safety net protection

Pillar 10: Inclusive Institutions

- Corruption perceptions index
- Government and public services efficiency
- Inclusiveness of institutions
- Political stability

== Global Social Mobility Index (2020) results ==
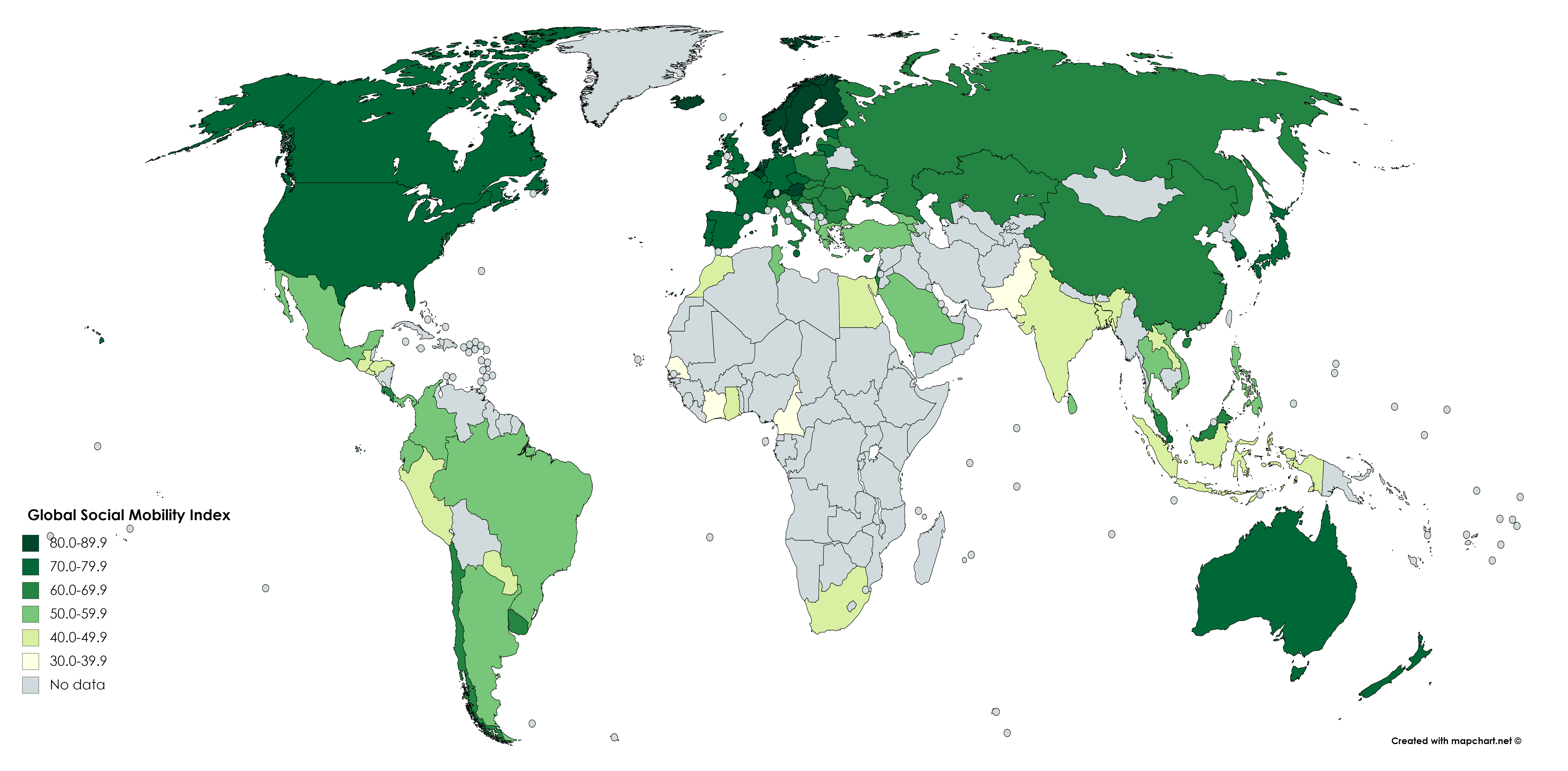
World map of the Global Social Mobility Index (2020).

Below is the list of 82 countries ranked by their score in the inaugural Global Social Mobility Index 2020. The value 100 was the highest possible score a country could receive.

Rank	Country	Index Score
1	Denmark	85.2
2	Norway	83.6
3	Finland	83.6
4	Sweden	83.5
5	Iceland	82.7
6	Netherlands	82.4
7	Switzerland	82.1
8	Belgium	80.1
9	Austria	80.1
10	Luxembourg	79.8
11	Germany	78.8
12	France	76.7
13	Slovenia	76.4
14	Canada	76.1
15	Japan	76.1
16	Australia	75.1
17	Malta	75.0
18	Ireland	75.0
19	Czech Republic	74.7
20	Singapore	74.6
21	United Kingdom	74.4
22	New Zealand	74.3
23	Estonia	73.5
24	Portugal	72.0
25	South Korea	71.4
26	Lithuania	70.5
27	United States	70.4
28	Spain	70.0
29	Cyprus	69.4
30	Poland	69.1
31	Latvia	69.0
32	Slovakia	68.5
33	Israel	68.1
34	Italy	67.4
35	Uruguay	67.1
36	Croatia	66.7
37	Hungary	65.8
38	Kazakhstan	64.8
39	Russia	64.7
40	Bulgaria	63.8
41	Serbia	63.8
42	Romania	63.1
43	Malaysia	62.0
44	Costa Rica	61.6
45	China	61.5
46	Ukraine	61.2
47	Chile	60.3
48	Greece	59.8
49	Moldova	59.6
50	Vietnam	57.8
51	Argentina	57.3
52	Saudi Arabia	57.1
53	Georgia	55.6
54	Albania	55.6
55	Thailand	55.4
56	Armenia	53.9
57	Ecuador	53.9
58	Mexico	52.6
59	Sri Lanka	52.3
60	Brazil	52.1
61	Philippines	51.7
62	Tunisia	51.7
63	Panama	51.4
64	Turkey	51.3
65	Colombia	50.3
66	Peru	49.9
67	Indonesia	49.3
68	El Salvador	47.4
69	Paraguay	46.8
70	Ghana	45.5
71	Egypt	44.8
72	Laos	43.8
73	Morocco	43.7
74	Honduras	43.5
75	Guatemala	43.5
76	India	42.7
77	South Africa	41.4
78	Bangladesh	40.2
79	Pakistan	36.7
80	Cameroon	36.0
81	Senegal	36.0
82	Ivory Coast	34.5

== Global Social Mobility Report 2020 summary ==
The World Economic Forum compiled its findings from the Global Social Mobility Index in its Global Social Mobility Report 2020 which includes information about the current state of economic inequality and provides recommendations for governments and businesses to alleviate inequalities. This section provides a summary of the report’s findings.

The World Economic Forum finds that the Fourth Industrial Revolution, which has involved rapid globalization and technological advancements, has led to increased inequality. For example, the World Economic Forum notes that the top percent of US earners made 158% more in 2018 than in 1979, whereas the bottom 90 percent of earners made only 24% more. In a review of the report, Hanna Ziady, a CNN Business contributor, states that in order for an American household with low income to reach the American median household income, it would require five generations. In light of these findings, Bhowmick, a researcher for the Observer Research Foundation, argues that policies that address social mobility are essential for countries with high income inequality to reduce poverty levels.

In a review of the report, Dr. Helal Uddin Ahmed writing for The Financial Express highlights that a social mobility agenda is needed to reduce inequality, and thus the organization created a set of goals that governments should prioritize. The World Economic Forum advises that governments use taxation for equality-focused public spending. To increase social mobility in the labor force, the World Economic Forum urges governments to find ways to support the expansion of education and lifelong learning which includes developing human capital along with workers’ careers. Dr. Helal Uddin Ahmed, in agreement with the World Economic Forum, states that improving education effectively involves spending on programs that target disadvantaged youth, placing quality of education as a priority.

The Global Social Mobility Report lists a set of goals for businesses: providing fair wages, educating their workers, and having a more merit-based hiring process. The report states that businesses benefit from socioeconomic equality because their consumer bases increase, consumer-business relations strengthen, and the economic environment stabilizes. Dr. Helal Uddin Ahmed finds that these benefits incentivize businesses to contribute to equality for economic reasons, not just ethical ones.

As Jones, managing editor for the Visual Capitalist, highlights, the Global Social Mobility Report 2020 also warns countries of the potential risks associated with low social mobility: unstable work and living environments, distrust in institutions, distrust in politics, and societal unraveling. Jones argues that the economic cost is high as well. She points out a statistic from the report claiming that if every country were to raise its score on the index by ten, global GDP could grow an additional 4.41% by 2030.

== Global Social Mobility Index (2020) application ==
Fifekova, a researcher of economic policy at the University of Economics in Bratislava, et al. have found the Global Social Mobility Index to be a key determinant of income inequality. The relationship between social mobility and income inequality can be explained by cause-effect cycles. Less equality of opportunity yields lower social mobility which leads to inherited inequalities, and the cycle continues.

Knowing that social mobility is a measure of income inequality, Suriyanrattakorn and Chang, researchers at Udon Thani Rajabjat University and National Chung Hsing University respectively, have found a relationship between the Global Social Mobility Index and life satisfaction measured by subjective well-being. Thus, countries with high inequality tend to have lower average national life satisfaction. The researchers conclude that countries with low social mobility should focus on policies that promote income equality in order to increase the well-being of their citizens.

Mwamba, an economics professor at the University of Johannesburg, et al. have found that the income level of a country was not necessarily correlated with its social mobility level. In agreement with the World Economic Forum, Mwamba et al. argue that it is difficult to ascend the social ladder regardless of a country’s income level. Thus, the research suggests that all countries can benefit from improvements in social mobility.

In light of the World Economic Report’s findings, McKinsey and Company conducted research on the UK to find that the Global Social Mobility Index has implications for the UK’s national economy as well as corporations. They conclude that low social mobility leads to inefficient talent allocation, and when paired with inequalities in gender or race, decreases the potential of the national labor force.
