= Augusta Vörlund =

Finnish poet (1807-1869)

- Born: 6 June 1807 Turku, Finland
- Died: 15 February 1869 (aged 61) Uusikaupunki
- Occupation: poet

Flora Augusta Vörlund (6 June 1807 Turku – 15 February 1869 Uusikaupunki) was a Finnish poet who wrote in Swedish.

Vörlund was the director of the Uusikaupunki boarding school for girls. In 1853, together with his friend Wendla Randelin, he published a literary calendar called Alku. The work contained poems by Vörlund (pen name Augusta) and Wendla Randelin (pen name Wendela) Novellin Maria, which take place during the Finnish War.

== Works ==
Initially, a poetic calendar Vendela [Randelin] and Augusta [Vörlund]. Frenckell, Helsingfors 1853
