= Environmental issues in Finland =

There are a number of environmental issues in Finland.

== Climate change ==
Finland was among the top five greenhouse gas emitters per capita in 2001: The consumption emissions per capita of greenhouse gases in 2001 of the top 5 countries were US 29 tonnes, Australia 21 tonnes, Canada 20 tonnes, Switzerland 18 tonnes and Finland 18 tonnes.

Finland is a member of the EU and thus the EU directives are binding in Finland. Finland has approved Kyoto Protocol. Finland has at the state level approved that human-induced greenhouse gases cause global warming. Despite this, the most harmful use of peat as energy has been financially promoted by the Finnish government since 2005.

CO_{2} emissions from peat were 15% and coal and peat 39% of total fossil fuel emissions in Finland in 2006.

As part of measures by the EU to reduce greenhouse gas emissions, the European Commission asked Finland to reduce its greenhouse gas emissions by 39% by 2030.

== Environmental assessment ==
Finland had a 2018 Forest Landscape Integrity Index mean score of 5.08/10, ranking it 109th globally out of 172 countries.

=== Threatened habitats ===
According to the Finnish Environment Institute three-year survey reported in 2018 the share of habitats classified as threatened in southern Finland is 59% and northern Finland 32%. The most important reasons were forestry, drainage, clearing of areas for arable land, construction, and eutrophication.

=== Threatened species ===
The assessment of threatened species is made every tenth year in Finland. In 2019 one-tenth of species in Finland are threatened. Halting the growth in the number of threatened species was not achieved by 2010. Even the new target of halting biodiversity loss by 2020 seems difficult to attain. Ca 1/3 of bird and bryophyte species are under threat and also large among lichens, vascular plants, butterflies and moths, and hymenopterans are under threat. Ca 10% of Finnish insect species are threatened. The primary cause of the threat is the decline and deterioration of natural habitat.

Finnish budget on environmental protection is €100 million compared to 70,000 million in human health care.

== Sustainability ==
Finland's ecological footprint for 2018 was 7.86 global hectares per person, 5.09 global hectares (gha) above the world average. If every country had an ecological footprint equal to Finland, it would require the equivalent biocapacity of 4.07 Earths to be sustainable. Finland's overshoot day calculated for 2022 was March 31st, four months earlier than the global average.

According to a Yale-led study in 2015, there were 4,500 trees for each Finn and in total 22 billion trees in Finland in 2015.

== Air pollution ==
In Finland, 1500–2000 people die every year from air pollution. Worldwide, 7-9 million people die from air pollution. Pollution comes from traffic and energy production, e.g.y coal and peat. Finland measures and reports air quality. There are no actions in place for reduced air quality in cities. Worldwide alternatives include reduced private car traffic and promotion of public transport with reduced or free tickets.

== Environmental finance ==
The environmental finance of Finland is 0.6% of the budget when OECD average is 1.7%. In September 2011, there was a proposal to cut environmental finance with 5 million € including an 18% cut in the nongovernmental environmental organizations support. The finance proposal included also a cut in the biodiversity support. All the main nongovernmental national environmental organizations criticized finance proposals since Finland's finance in the environmental issues is not sufficient, the fulfillment of the EU biodiversity targets is questionable, and the peat industry receives 50-fold more state support compared to the environmental organizations.

== Environmental law enforcement ==
According to the Finnish Association for Nature Conservation (FANC) Finnish police lacks resources to investigate environmental crimes in Finland as of 2013.

== Phosphates ==
Finnish government has not denied the use of phosphates in the washing powder as was valid in Sweden and Germany at least already in 2009. State intention is to deny phosphates after the European Union directive sets the demand in 2012.

== Traffic ==
The car tax was cut in 2007 to support investments in new cars. The state arguments promised it to reduce traffic emissions by 0.37% a year. Environmental organizations considered the tax cut negative for global warming. Politicians did nor explain, why some old cars would not remain also in the traffic and increase the overall emissions. In the use of the private car the upfront costs are a higher barrier than the annual or daily costs. Most cars are imported in Finland, which increases the foreign debt.

Jorma Ollila (works for Shell) group made recommendations for future traffic of Finland in 2013. Based on this report in July 2014 it was discussed to lower the upfront costs of cars and increase the costs of car use. This would be in the favor of the interests of the Royal Dutch Shell since according to studies the upfront costs will reduce more the traffic than the consuming taxes. Traffic poses large problems e.g. in the demand of land areas and parking places. Lower ticket prices would increase the use of Public transport. Free public transport, both cities, and rural areas could be financed by taxes from private cars.

=== Noise ===
According to National Institute for Health and Welfare (Finland) a million people in Finland suffer the noise from roads and traffic. 37% of residents in the Helsinki metropolitan area lived in an area with a noise level of over 55 dB In 2017. In 2017 versus 2012 the number of people suffering the noise of trains increased by 20%. Noise increases among others blood pressure, Cardiovascular disease and, strokes in the brain.

== Mining ==
A large nickel mine located at Talvivaara leaked hundreds of thousands of cubic metres of tailings pond water containing toxic metals into the nearby environment in November 2012. The uranium concentration in the effluent rose by 100-200 times its normal level in the bottom and surface waters. Poisonous water leaked out at a speed of 5 000-6 000 cubic metres an hour. The mine has leaked also in 2008 and 2010. As a result, environmentally hazardous concentrations of nickel, zinc, cadmium, and uranium were reached in the local river, exceeding the permitted yearly maximum in the environmental permit by a factor of 50.

The Dragon Mining company had contaminated waters with elevated levels of sulfate, nitrogen, and metals in the Orivesi goldmine in March 2013.

The Russian-owned Norilsk Nickel mine in Harjavalta western Finland released 66,000 kg Nickel in the local Kokemäenjoki (Kokemäki River) in July 2014. After release, the nickel concentrations were 400 times normal levels. This was the largest known Ni release in Finnish history.
