= Sikhism in Finland =

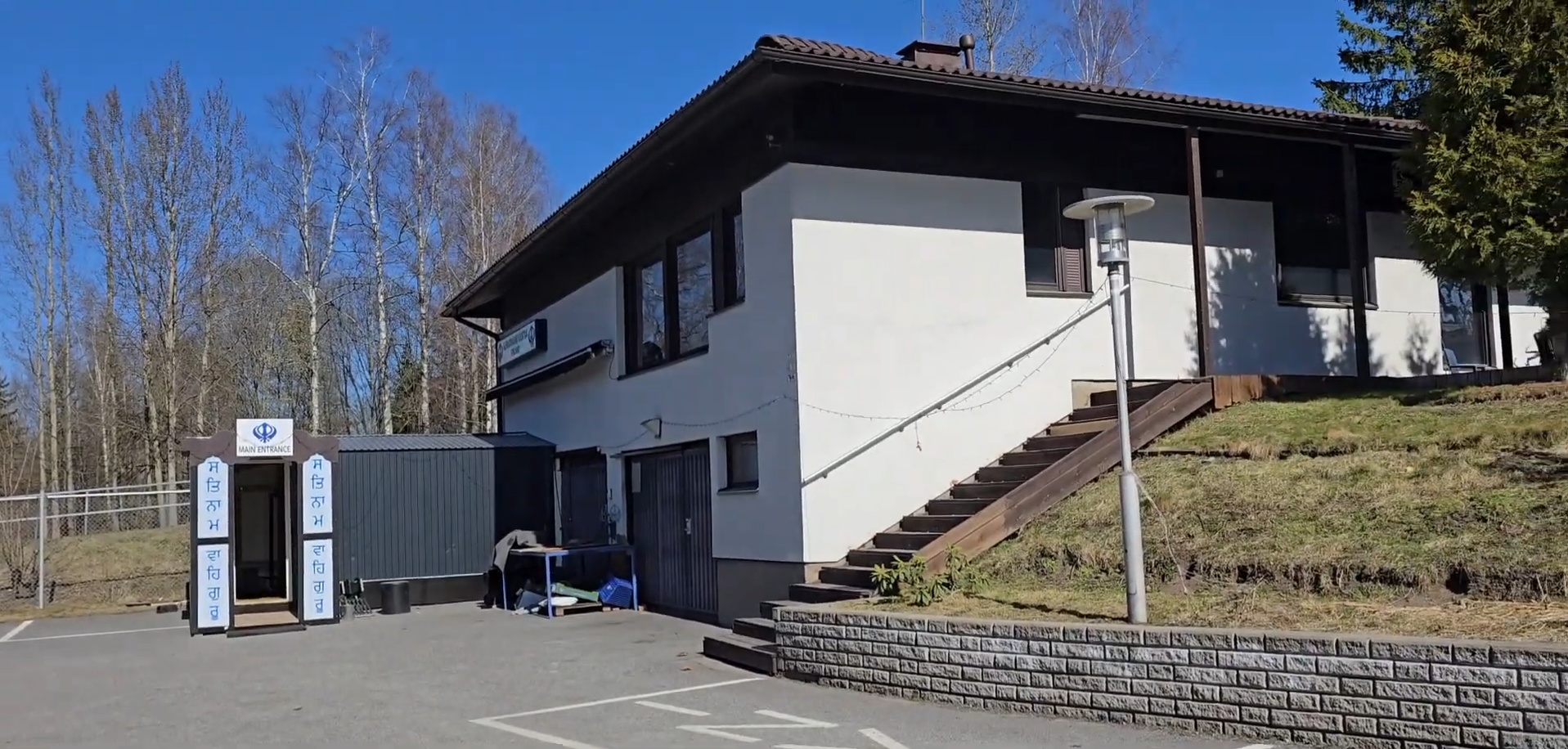
- Exterior view of Gurudwara Vantaa, a Sikh temple located in Vantaa, Finland

Total population
- 1000–2000

Regions with significant populations
- Helsinki metropolitan area

Religions
- Sikhism

Languages
- Punjabi · Finnish · English

Sikhism is a small minority religion Finland. There are approximately 1000–2000 Sikhs living in the country. The majority of the Sikh population is concentrated in the Helsinki metropolitan area, particularly in the cities of Helsinki and Vantaa.

== History and demographics ==
The first notable contact between Finland and Sikhs occurred during the 1952 Summer Olympics in Helsinki, where turban-wearing Sikh members of the Indian field hockey team won the gold medal.

The first Sikhs arrived in Finland in the early 1970s, marking the beginning of permanent migration from the Punjab region of India. This early migration was primarily driven by economic factors, including high unemployment in Punjab, which prompted individuals to seek employment opportunities in Finland. While the total population is estimated at around 1000-2000 individuals today, the officially registered membership of the religious community is significantly lower. This discrepancy exists because many Sikh immigrants actively participate in community events and temple life without formally registering with the state. Most Sikhs in Finland are fluent in Finnish, Punjabi, and English.

== Places of worship ==
The Finnish Sikh community began to formally organize in the late 1990s, establishing the Suomen Gurdwara-yhdyskunta (Finnish Gurdwara Community), which was officially registered as a religious community on May 8, 1998. This overarching organization is responsible for covering the practical costs and maintenance of the temples.

The first permanent place of worship, Gurdwara Sarab Sangat Sahib, opened at Hämeentie in Helsinki in 2006. A second temple, Gurudwara Vantaa, was later established to serve the community living in Vantaa.

The Gurudwara Vantaa, located at Siriuksenpolku 1 in Korso, originally held its inaugural services in April 2017 in a rented space near the Jumbo shopping centre. Around 2019–2020, the community relocated to its current permanent site, which previously housed a local maintenance company. The building was renovated through collective community efforts into a multi-level complex featuring a downstairs community kitchen (langar hall) and an upstairs prayer hall (diwan hall). It is currently the only Gurudwara in Finland to fly the traditional Nishan Sahib flag on its premises.

Since approximately 2021, the temple has been served by a full-time resident priest (Granthi), Baba Narinder Singh, who previously served the Sikh diaspora in Denmark for five years. Initially, religious services were conducted voluntarily by members of the congregation, but the community later secured a religious worker permit for Singh through the Finnish Embassy in India to establish a permanent spiritual leadership.

The gurdwaras play a vital role not only for religious services but also as cultural hubs where parents can pass down their Sikh heritage to children raised in Finland. To preserve cultural and religious heritage among youth raised in Finland, Gurudwara Vantaa offers free community education classes on Saturdays. These sessions focus on teaching the Punjabi language, the Gurmukhi script, traditional Sikh devotional music (Kirtan), and religious principles and ethics (Gurmat).

- Gurdwara Sarb Sangat, Helsinki
- Gurdwara Vantaa, Vantaa

The community has, however, experienced some internal divisions. A doctrinal dispute over the interpretation of a secondary scripture, the Dasam Granth, has led to differing stances between the Helsinki and Vantaa temples.

Beyond religious services, gurdwaras in Finland increasingly act as social support and integration hubs. Gurudwara Vantaa, for example, has taken an active role in orienting new international students from the diaspora, providing informal courses on Finnish civic norms and social etiquette to ease their transition into the local culture.

== Employment and integration ==
Sikhs in Finland have integrated highly successfully into the labor market, boasting a near-zero unemployment rate. The vast majority of Finnish Sikhs work in the restaurant and bar industry, either as employees or independent entrepreneurs. Entering this sector has often been facilitated by existing community networks, and working in the service industry accelerates Finnish language acquisition through regular interactions with ethnic Finns. The community actively emphasizes their religious ethic of hard work to construct a positive identity as reliable, good immigrants within Finnish society.

== Identity and religious rights ==
Preserving Sikh identity in a secular, fast-paced Finnish society has presented some challenges. Some Finnish Sikh men engage in "situational dressing", adapting their traditional attire to their specific social or professional environments. In fact, few Sikh men in Finland currently wear the traditional turban on a daily basis, and many have opted to cut their hair and beards to better fit their busy lifestyles.

However, the right to wear a turban at work was secured through a landmark legal victory. In 2013, Gill Sukhdarshan Singh, an Indian-born Sikh bus driver in Vantaa, was prohibited by his employer from wearing his turban on the job. He challenged the ban, and in 2014, the policy was ruled discriminatory, officially granting him the right to wear his turban while working.
