= Mikhail Fyodorovich Ganskau =

Finnish politician

Mikhail Fyodorovich Ganskau (7 January 1867 – 26 March 1917) was a Finnish politician. He was a member of the Senate of Finland.
