= Elsa Holmsten =

Finnish poet (1709-1735)

- Born: 1709 or 1710 Oulu, Finland, Sweden
- Died: 20 October 1735
- Occupation: poet

Elsa Christina Holmsten-Vaklin (1709 or 1710 Oulu – 20 October 1735 Oulu) was an early Finnish female poet.

== Life ==
Elsa Holmsten was married to postmaster Johann Wakelin from 1734. They renounced their faith to marry and returned to the State religion. Elsa Wakelin died a few years later in 1735 due to difficult childbirth.

Elsa Holmsten wrote four verses in Swedish, which her husband Johan Wakelin translated into Finnish in 1737 and published as a daily newspaper. One of the songs is also included in the current Virsikirja as hymn 307.

Toivo Hyyryläinen wrote the play Lasimeri about the life of Elsa Holmsten.
