= Maria Simointytär =

Finnish poet

Maria Simointytär was a Finnish poet. She is regarded as the first published female poet in Finland. She wrote religious poem ”Orpolapsen vaikerrus”, about the fatherless children, which was published in 1683.
