= List of schools in Finland =

This is a list of schools in Finland, listed by region.

== Central Finland ==
- Tikkakoski secondary school

== Northern Ostrobothnia ==
- Laanila Highschool
- Oulu International School
- Oulun Lyseon Lukio
- Oulun Suomalaisen Yhteiskoulun Lukio

== Northern Savonia ==
- Kuopion Lyseon lukio
- Kuopio Senior High of Music and Dance

== Ostrobothnia ==
- Vasa övningsskola

== Pirkanmaa ==
- Nokian lukio
- Tampere College

== Satakunta ==
- Porin Lyseo
- West Finland College

== Southern Savonia ==
- Pertunmaa Comprehensive School

== Southwest Finland ==
- Katedralskolan i Åbo
- Salo Upper Secondary School
- Turku International School
- Turun normaalikoulu

== Uusimaa ==
- Alppila Upper Secondary School
- Deutsche Schule Helsinki
- The English School (Helsinki)
- Helsingin normaalilyseo
- Helsingin Suomalainen Yhteiskoulu
- Helsingin yhteislyseo
- International School of Helsinki
- Jokela High School
- Postipuu School
- Ressu Comprehensive School
- Ressu Upper Secondary School
- Tikkurilan lukio

== See also ==
- Education in Finland
- List of universities in Finland
- List of polytechnics in Finland
