= UAF =

UAF may refer to:

== Organisations ==
- Uganda Athletics Federation
- Ukrainian Air Force
- Ukrainian Armed Forces
- Ukrainian Artistic Front
- Ukrainian Association of Football
- Financial Intelligence Unit (Spanish: Unidad de Análisis Financiero), in Panama, Paraguay and other Latin-American countries
- l'Union des Aéroports Français (French Airports Association)
- Unite Against Fascism, United Kingdom
- United Arab Emirates Air Force (ICAO Code UAF)
- University Admissions Finland
- University of Agriculture, Faisalabad, Pakistan
- University of Alaska Fairbanks, United States

== Other uses ==
- Use after free, a class of software vulnerability
- Universal Authentication Framework; see FIDO Alliance
- Universal Access Fund; see Digicel
- Unified Architecture Framework; see UAF Specification from Object Management Group
