= Hyl =

Hyl or HYL may refer to:

- Helsingin yhteislyseo, a school in Kontula, Helsinki, Finland
- Hydroxylysine, an amino acid
- HYL, the IATA code for Hollis Seaplane Base, Alaska, US
- HYL, the National Rail code for Hayle railway station, Cornwall, UK
- Hyl (unit) or metric slug, a unit of mass
- Nils Hylander (1904–1970), Swedish botanist, author abbreviation
