= List of universities in Finland =

This is a list of the universities in Finland. Institutions of higher education are designated as universities by Finnish legislation. Only universities have the right to confer degrees in the categories of alempi korkeakoulututkinto/lägre högskoleexamen (bachelor's degree) and ylempi korkeakoulututkinto/högre högskoleexamen (master's degree) and doctoral degrees.

Finland has also a second system of tertiary education, consisting of the universities of applied sciences (Finnish: ammattikorkeakoulu; Swedish: yrkeshögskola). These institutions were formerly translated as polytechnics. However, since 2006, the official English title has been university of applied sciences, following a series of reforms to align the sector with international higher education standards (see the list of polytechnics in Finland). The universities of applied sciences offer a more practical and professional approach to their education and confer degrees at the bachelor's (ammattikorkeakoulututkinto / yrkeshögskoleexamen) and master's (ylempi ammattikorkeakoulututkinto / högre yrkeshögskoleexamen) levels. In international usage, these degrees have the same names as those conferred by Finnish traditional universities.

== Universities ==
=== Multidisciplinary universities ===
The Finnish universities are (sorted by the year of establishment):

No	Name	Established date	First establishment	Type	Location	Students	Administrative staff
1	University of Helsinki	1640	1640	Public	Helsinki	34,833	8,000
2	Åbo Akademi University	1918	1918	Public	Turku and Vaasa	5,500	1,300
3	University of Turku	1920	1920	Public	Turku, Pori	19,488	3,319
4	University of Jyväskylä	1934	1863	Public	Jyväskylä	14,492	2,583
5	University of Oulu	1958	1958	Public	Oulu	14,221	2,852
6	University of Vaasa	1968	1968	Public	Vaasa	5,048	498
7	University of Lapland	1979	1979	Public	Rovaniemi	4,349	633
8	University of Eastern Finland	2010	1966	Public	Joensuu and Kuopio	15,000	2,800
9	Aalto University	2010	1849	Public	Espoo and Helsinki	18,116	4,424
10	LUT University	2019	1969	Public	Lappeenranta and Lahti	7,770	1,380
11	Tampere University	2019	1925	Public	Tampere, Pori and Seinäjoki	20,600	3,550

=== Specialized universities ===
In Finland, there are a few institutions of higher education that have full university status, but which specialize in certain academic fields:

No	Name	Established date	First establishment	Type	Location	Students	Administrative staff
1	Hanken School of Economics	1909	1909	Public	Helsinki, Vaasa	2,200	130
2	National Defence University	1993	1919	Public	Helsinki	850	350
3	University of the Arts Helsinki	2013	1848	Public	Helsinki	1,993	729

The National Defence University is not considered a university by Finnish law, although it has the authority to award bachelor's, master's and doctoral degrees and to pursue free research, and its rector is a member of the Council of Finnish University rectors. The practical effect of this distinction is minor, and most notable in the administrative organization of the university, which is military instead of civilian.

== See also ==
- University Admissions Finland
- University consortium
- University Consortium of Pori
- List of polytechnics in Finland
- List of colleges and universities
- List of colleges and universities by country
- List of schools in Finland
- List of universities in Denmark
- List of universities in Iceland
- List of universities in Norway
- List of universities and colleges in Sweden
