= Education in Finland =

Ministry of Education and Culture
- Minister of Education Minister of Science and Culture: Anders Adlercreutz; Mari-Leena Talvitie

National education budget (2018)
- Budget: € 11.9 billion

General details
- Primary languages: Finnish, Swedish, English
- System type: National
- Current system: since 1970s

Literacy (2000)
- Total: 99.5%
- Male: 99.5%
- Female: 99.5%

Enrollment
- Total: n/a
- Primary: 99.7% (graduating)
- Secondary: 66.2% (graduating)
- Post secondary: n/a

Attainment
- Secondary diploma: 54% ac., 45% voc.
- Post-secondary diploma: 44% (of 25–64 year-olds)
- Secondary and tertiary education divided in academic and vocational systems

The educational system in Finland consists of daycare programmes (for babies and toddlers), a one-year "preschool" (age six), and an 11-year compulsory basic comprehensive school (age seven to age eighteen). As of 2024, secondary general academic and vocational education, higher education and adult education are compulsory.

Finland's education policy is built on 5 principles:1-Common, consistent long term policies,2-A vision of a knowledge-based society,3-Educational Equality,4-Decision making at the local level,5-Culture of Trust..During their nine years of common basic education, students are not selected, tracked, or streamed. There is also inclusive special education within the classroom and instructional efforts to minimize low achievement. After basic education, students must choose to continue with secondary education in either an academic track (lukio) or a vocational track (ammattioppilaitos), both of which usually take three years and give a qualification to continue to tertiary education. Tertiary education is divided into university and polytechnic (ammattikorkeakoulu, also known as "university of applied sciences") systems. Universities award licentiate- and doctoral-level degrees. Formerly, only university graduates could obtain higher (postgraduate) degrees, however, since the implementation of the Bologna process, all bachelor's degree holders can now qualify for further academic studies. There are 17 universities and 27 universities of applied sciences in the country.

The United Nations Development Programme derived an Education Index, a reflection of mean years of schooling of adults and expected years of schooling of children, that placed Finland fourth in the world as of 2019.

Finland has consistently ranked high in the PISA study, which compares national educational systems internationally, although in the recent years Finland has been displaced from the very top. In the 2012 study, Finland ranked sixth in reading, twelfth in mathematics and fifth in science, while back in the 2003 study Finland was first in both science and reading and second in mathematics. Finland's tertiary Education has moreover been ranked first by the World Economic Forum.

On the other hand, domestically a decline in the learning outcomes has long been pointed out, and in 2023, Ministry of Education and Culture published a report called bildung review, in which it admitted that the exceptionally rapid drop in the reading and mathematics proficiency has been observed.

In another international assessment called TIMSS, the results of Finland has constantly been mediocre.

While celebrated for its overall success, Finland had a gender gap on the 2012 PISA reading standards identified in a 2015 Brookings Institution report, but this can be put down to many factors such as the choice of the field of work into which each gender goes. The performance of 15-year-old boys then was not significantly different from OECD averages and was 0.66 of a standard deviation behind that of girls the same age.

The governments of Jyrki Katainen, Alexander Stubb and Juha Sipilä cut education funds in Finland over 2011–2018 by a total of €1.5 billion. The number of university and college employees was cut by more than 7500.

== History ==
Literacy is a key part of Lutheranism, the state and majority religion of Finland, as Christians are supposed to be able to read the Bible in their native language. Bishop Mikael Agricola studied under Martin Luther and translated the New Testament to Finnish in 1548. The first university in Finland (Royal Academy of Turku) was founded in 1640. Literacy reached over 50% in the late 18th century and 80–90% in the mid-19th century. Where there were no schools in a municipality, reading was taught in traveling schools (kiertokoulu). Confirmation, a rite of transition to adulthood, is only permissible for the literate, and enables e.g. entrance into marriage. Official statistics are available from 1880, when literacy was 97.6%. The early system under Swedish rule was in Swedish and consisted of a basic "pedagogio" for teaching reading and writing, a trivial school teaching grammar, Latin, Greek, rhetoric and dialectics, a gymnasium preparing for university, and the university. In the 19th century, the system evolved into what was later known as kansakoulu ("people's school") and oppikoulu ("learning school"), including high school (lukio), followed by university. In mid-19th century, Finnish became an official language, and gradually replaced Swedish as the schooling language. In 1898, everyone was given the right to attend kansakoulu. Attendance reached 50% in 1911 and became mandatory in 1921; municipalities were obliged to provide the schooling. Free school lunches became mandatory in 1948. Oppikoulu, entered at the age of 10, was still optional and entrance was competitive. Since it was the only way to university education and entrance was heavily affected by the status and choices of parents, it severely limited the opportunities of the less-well off. Working-class people would often complete only the kansakoulu and enter the workforce. This system was phased out in 1972–1977 in favor of the modern system where years 1–9 are mandatory. After the age of 15, the system bifurcates into academic (lukio) and vocational tracks (ammattioppilaitos) both at the secondary and tertiary levels. Recently, it became formally possible to enter tertiary education with a vocational degree, although this is practically difficult as the vocational study plan does not prepare the student for the university entrance exams.

== Early childhood education ==
In Finland, high class daycare and nursery-kindergarten are considered critical for developing the cooperation and communication skills important to prepare young children for lifelong education, as well as formal learning of reading and mathematics. This preparatory period lasts until the age of 7.

Finnish early childhood education emphasizes respect for each child's individuality and chance for each child to develop as a unique person. Finnish early educators also guide children in the development of social and interactive skills, encourage them to pay attention to other people's needs and interests, to care about others, and to have a positive attitude toward other people, other cultures, and different environments. The purpose of gradually providing opportunities for increased independence is to enable all children to take care of themselves as "becoming adults, to be capable of making responsible decisions, to participate productively in society as an active citizen, and to take care of other people who will need his (or her) help."

To foster a culture of reading, parents of newborn babies are given three books - one for each parent, and a baby book for the child - as part of the "maternity package." According to Finnish child development specialist Eeva Hujala, "Early education is the first and most critical stage of lifelong learning. Neurological research has shown that 90% of brain growth occurs during the first five years of life, and 85% of the nerve paths develop before starting school (NB: at the age of seven in Finland)." "Care" in this context is synonymous with upbringing and is seen as a cooperative endeavor between parents and society to prepare children physically (eating properly, keeping clean) and mentally (communication, social awareness, empathy, and self-reflection) before beginning more formal learning at age seven. The idea is that before seven they learn best through play, so by the time they finally get to school they are keen to start learning.

Finland has had access to free universal daycare for children aged eight months to five years in place since 1990, and a year of "preschool/kindergarten" at age six since 1996. "Daycare" includes both full-day childcare centers and municipal playgrounds with adult supervision where parents can accompany the child. Municipalities also pay mothers who wish to do so to remain at home and provide "home daycare" for the first three years. In some cases this includes occasional visits from a careworker to see that the environment is appropriate. The ratio of adults to children in local municipal childcare centers (either private but subsidized by local municipalities or paid for by municipalities with the help of grants from the central government) is, for children three years old and under: three adults (one teacher and two nurses) for every 12 pupils (or one-to-four); and, for children age three to six: three adults (one teacher and two nurses) for every 20 children (or circa one-to-seven). Payment, where applicable, is scaled to family income and ranges from free to about 200 euros a month maximum. According to Pepa Ódena in these centers, "You are not taught, you learn. The children learn through playing. This philosophy is put into practice in all the schools we visited, in what the teachers say, and in all that one sees."

Early childhood education is not mandatory in Finland, but is used by almost everyone. "We see it as the right of the child to have daycare and preschool," explained Eeva Penttilä, of Helsinki's Education Department. "It's not a place where you dump your child when you're working. It's a place for your child to play and learn and make friends. Good parents put their children in daycare. It's not related to socio-economic class."

The focus for kindergarten students is to "learn how to learn", Ms. Penttilä said. Instead of formal instruction in reading and math there are lessons on nature, animals, and the "circle of life" and a focus on materials- based learning. It is strongly believed that when children develop learning to learn as a life skill and see the real life applications of the knowledge they gather, they will become lifelong learners.

== Basic comprehensive education ==
Education in Finland
Academic degrees	Vocational degrees	Typical ages
doctor	employment
licentiate	employment
master	master (new)	(+2-3)
bachelor	bachelor	(+3-4)
upper secondary school (compulsory from September 2021 unless 18 or older, previously optional)	vocational school (compulsory from September 2021 unless 18 or older, previously optional)	17-18–19
upper secondary school (compulsory from September 2021 unless 18 or older, previously optional)	vocational school (compulsory from September 2021 unless 18 or older, previously optional)	16-17–18
upper secondary school (compulsory from September 2021 unless 18 or older, previously optional)	vocational school (compulsory from September 2021 unless 18 or older, previously optional)	15-16–17
comprehensive school (compulsory)		14-15–16
comprehensive school (compulsory)		13-14–15
comprehensive school (compulsory)		12-13–14
comprehensive school (compulsory)		11-12–13
comprehensive school (compulsory)		10-11–12
comprehensive school (compulsory)		9-10–11
comprehensive school (compulsory)		8-9–10
comprehensive school (compulsory)		7-8–9
comprehensive school (compulsory)		6-7–8
preschool		5-6–7

The compulsory educational system in Finland consists of a nine-year comprehensive school from 1st to 9th year, (Finnish peruskoulu, Swedish grundskola, "basic school"), and with new legislation, the compulsory education was expanded to ages of 7 to 18 and to include upper secondary school (Finnish lukio, Swedish gymnasium) or vocational school (Finnish ammattikoulu, Swedish yrkesskola, "profession school"). (Homeschooling is allowed, but rare). There are no "gifted" programs, and the more advanced children are expected to help those who are slower to catch on.

In most countries, the term "comprehensive school" is used to refer to comprehensive schools attended after primary school, and up to the 12th and 13th year in some countries, but in Finland this English term is used to include primary school, i.e. it is used to refer to all of the years 1 to 9 (and not later years). One can of course also describe the Finnish years 1 to 6 in English as being comprehensive schools, but this is unnecessary and confusing because primary schools have always been comprehensive in almost all countries, including Finland. In addition, it is best to not try to translate the Finnish term peruskoulu with a single term in English. In order to avoid confusion in English, it is best to describe the Finnish compulsory education system as consisting of 6-year primary schools, called alakoulu or ala-aste in Finnish, followed by comprehensive 3-year middle schools, called yläkoulu or yläaste in Finnish. Although this division of the peruskoulu into two parts was officially discontinued, it is still very much alive — the distinction is made in everyday speech, the teachers' training and classification and teaching, and even in most school buildings. In addition, the use of two different terms for years 1–6 and 7–9 is easier to understand for people from most other countries, most of which do not have a single term for primary and middle schools. On the contrary, middle schools and high schools are usually included in the term secondary education in English, which is why the use of this term in English is often confusing for Finns. (The Finnish direct translation toisen asteen koulutus/oppilaitos only refers to schools after 9th year, i.e. high schools, vocational schools, etc).

Schools up to the university level are almost exclusively funded and administered by the municipalities of Finland (local government). There are few private schools. The founding of a new private comprehensive school requires a decision by the Council of State. When founded, private schools are given a state grant comparable to that given to a municipal school of the same size. However, even in private schools, the use of tuition fees is strictly prohibited, and selective admission is prohibited, as well: private schools must admit all its pupils on the same basis as the corresponding municipal school. In addition, private schools are required to give their students all the education and social benefits that are offered to the students of municipal schools. Because of this, existing private schools are mostly faith-based or Waldorf schools, which are comprehensive by definition.

Teachers, who are fully unionized, follow state curriculum guidelines but are accorded a great deal of autonomy as to methods of instruction and are even allowed to choose their own textbooks.

Classes are small, seldom more than twenty pupils. From the outset pupils are expected to learn two languages in addition to the language of the school (usually Finnish or Swedish), and students in years one through nine spend from four to eleven periods each week taking classes in art, music, cooking, carpentry, metalwork, and textiles. Small classes, insisted upon by the teachers' union, appear to be associated with student achievement, especially in science. Inside the school, the atmosphere is relaxed and informal, and the buildings are so clean that students often wear socks and no shoes. Outdoor activities are stressed, even in the coldest weather; and homework is minimal to leave room for extra-curricular activities. In addition to taking music in school, for example, many students attend the numerous state-subsidized specialized music schools after class where for a small fee they learn to play an instrument as a hobby and study basic solfège and music theory using methods originated in Hungary by Kodály and further developed by the Hungarian-born Finn Csaba Szilvay and others.

Reading for pleasure is actively encouraged (Finland publishes more children's books than any other country). Television stations show foreign programs in the original languages with subtitles, so that in Finland children even read while watching TV.

During the first years of comprehensive school, grading may be limited to verbal assessments rather than formal grades. The start of numerical grading is decided locally. Most commonly, pupils are issued a report card twice a year: at the ends of the autumn and spring terms. There are no high-stakes tests.

Grades are awarded on a scale from 4 to 10. In individual exams, but not on school year report or basic education certificate, it is also possible to divide the scale further with '½', which represents a half grade, and '+' and '–', which represent one-fourth a grade better or worse. For example, the order is "9 < 9+ < 9½ < 10– < 10. The grade '10+' can also be awarded for a perfect performance with extra effort by the student.

If a comprehensive school pupil receives a grade of 4 for a particular subject at the end of the spring term, they must show that they have improved in the subject by sitting a separate examination at the end of summer term. If the pupil receives multiple failing grades, they may have to repeat the entire year, though it is considered far preferable to provide a struggling student with extra help and tutoring. In the rare case where a student needs to repeat, the decision is made by the teachers and the headmaster after interviewing the pupil and the parents.

Comprehensive school students enjoy a number of social entitlements, such as school health care and a free lunch every day, which covers about a third of the daily nutritional need. In addition, pupils are entitled to receive free books and materials and free school trips, or even housing in the event that they have a long or arduous trip to school.

== Upper secondary education ==
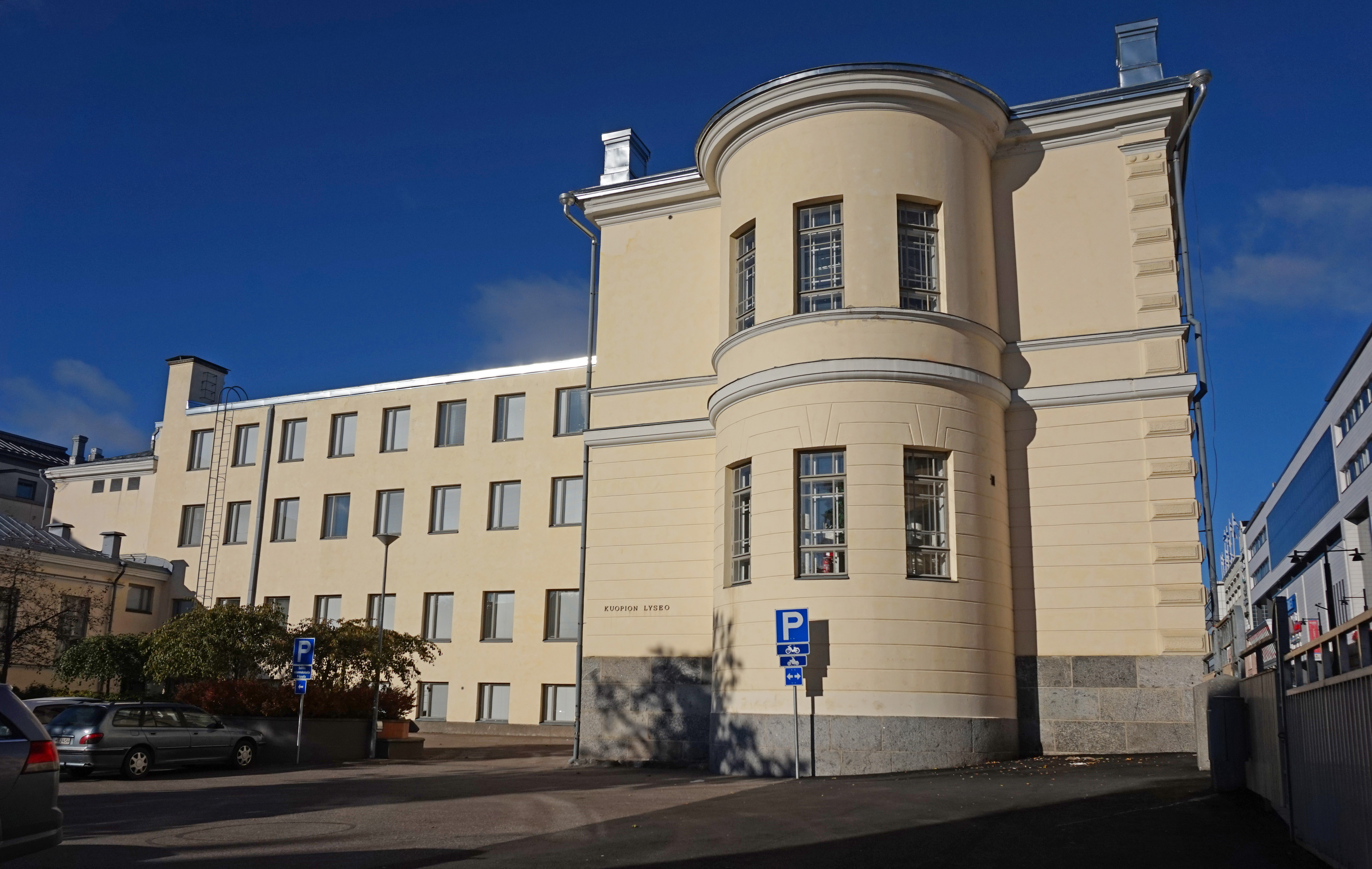
Kuopio Lyceum (Kuopion Lyseo) in Kuopio

Upper secondary education begins at 15 or 16 and lasts three to four years (roughly corresponding to the last two years of American high school plus what in the USA would be a two-year Community or Junior College). It used to be optional, but has since become compulsory since September 2021. Finnish upper secondary students may choose whether to undergo occupational training to develop vocational competence and/or to prepare them for a polytechnic institute or to enter an academic upper school focusing on preparation for university studies and post-graduate professional degrees in fields such as law, medicine, science, education, and the humanities. Admissions to academic upper schools are based on GPA, and in some cases academic tests and interviews. For example, during the year 2007, 51% of the age group were enrolled in the academic upper school.

The system, however, is not rigid and vocational school graduates may formally qualify for a university of applied sciences or, in some cases, university education; conversely, academic secondary school graduates may enroll in vocational education programs. It is also possible to attend both vocational and academic secondary schools at the same time. Tuition is free, and vocational and academic students are entitled to school health care, a free lunch, books and a transport to the school.

Upon graduation, vocational school graduates receive a vocational school certificate. Academic upper secondary school graduates receive both secondary school certification and undergo a nationally graded matriculation examination (Finnish: Ylioppilastutkinto). This was originally the entrance examination to the University of Helsinki, and its high prestige survives to this day. Students in special programs may receive a vocational school certificate and take the matriculation examination (kaksoistutkinto) or all of the three certifications (kolmoistutkinto). Approximately 83% of the upper academic school students, or 42% of the age group, complete the matriculation examination.

Polytechnic institutes require school certification for admission, whereas the matriculation examination is more important in university admissions. However, some tertiary education programs have their own admission examinations, and many use a mixture of both.

=== Advanced curricula in the upper academic school ===
In relation to mathematics, the second national language and foreign languages, a student can choose to study a curriculum from different levels of difficulty. Students choose their relevant levels at the beginning of school, when selecting appropriate courses, and at the end of school, when registering for the matriculation exam in order to receive the relevant exam paper. These two choices are not directly linked, but students generally keep the level the same for the matriculation exam. One common exception to this rule of thumb occurs when a student has barely completed a higher level course and is unsure of their performance in the matriculation exam. In those cases, a student may elect to take an easier exam.

In mathematics, the advanced level is in practice a prerequisite for the more competitive university science programs, such as those of the universities of technology, other university mathematical science programs, and medicine. In mathematics, 20% of the matriculation examinees take the advanced level. The nationwide matriculation exam together with entirely percentile-based grading provides an easy way to objectively classify each student based on their mathematical ability, regardless of the year when the exam was taken. For example, assuming that the best mathematical students are selected first to the upper academic school and then to the advanced mathematics curriculum, the students achieving laudatur would comprise the mathematically best 0.4% of the age group, comparable to 800 SAT mathematics section. The percentile equality does not, however, mean that the absolute level of a laudatur student in the advanced mathematics in Finland is equal to that of an 800 SAT student in the US, due to differences in the mean quality of the population.

== Teachers ==
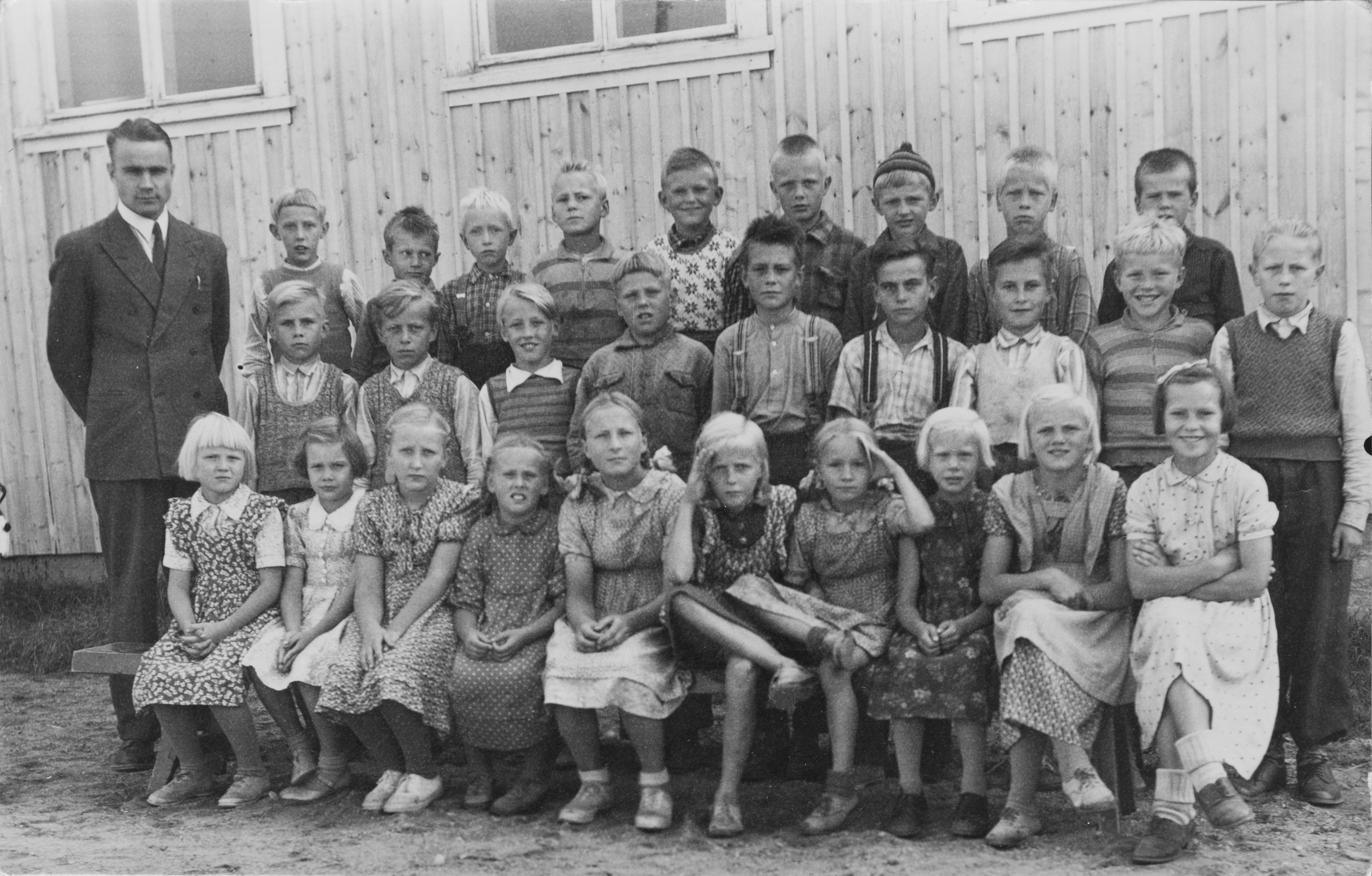
Finnish children in a 1950s classroom photo taken at the Saaristopiiri School in Eurajoki. The teacher of the picture (left) is the young Mauno Koivisto, thirty years before his presidency.

Both primary and secondary teachers must have a master's degree to qualify. Entrance to university programs is highly competitive.

== Tertiary education ==
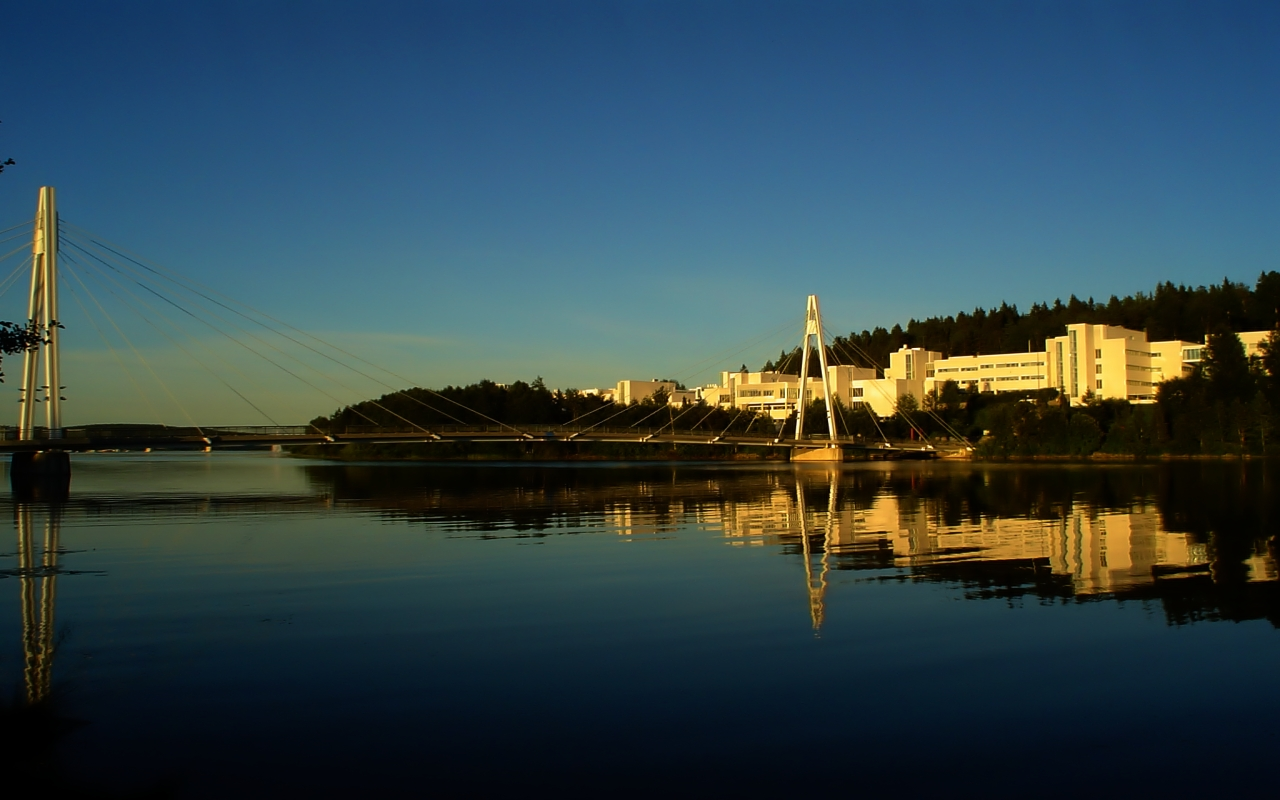
University of Jyväskylä Ylistönrinne campus

There are two sectors in the tertiary education: traditional universities (yliopisto, universitet) and universities of applied sciences (ammattikorkeakoulu, yrkeshögskola, or AMK/YH for short). Admissions are based on the high school final GPA, the high school final exam (ylioppilastutkinto), and the university entrance examinations. The selection process is fully transparent, merit-based, and objective; there are no application essays, no human factor in selection, no underrepresented minority support (except for preset quotas for Swedish speakers), and no weight on extracurricular activities. Moreover, the entrance examinations are rarely long multiple-choice exams, and instead consist of a smaller number of longer and more complicated questions that are supposed to test more than memorization and quick mechanical problem solving. Therefore, the selection process is very different from many other countries.

The focus for universities is research in science, and they give theoretical education. In many programs graduating with a master's degree is expected, with no separate admissions process between Bachelor and master's degrees. The universities of applied sciences focus more on responding to the needs of the world of work and they engage in industry development projects. The nature of research is more practical and theories are applied to advanced problem solving. For example, physicians are university graduates, whereas registered nurses and engineers graduate from universities of applied sciences. (However, universities also award degrees in Nursing Science and Engineering). Most vocational schools and universities of applied sciences are governed by municipalities, while some are private entities. (As an exception, the Police College is governed by the Ministry of the Interior). All Finnish general universities were state-run until 2010, when they were privatized as foundations or corporations under public law.

A bachelor's degree in a general universitytakes three to four years and is usually only an intermediate step towards the master's degree. A bachelor's degree in a university of applied sciences (a polytechnic degree), on the other hand, takes about 3.5–4.5 years. Polytechnic degrees are generally accepted as equivalent to university degrees.

Graduates from universities and universities of applied sciences are able to continue their studies by applying to master's degree programmes in universities or universities of applied sciences. After bachelor's degree graduates have completed two years' work experience in their field, they are qualified to apply for master's degree programmes in universities of applied sciences which are work- and research-oriented. Lower university degree graduates are also qualified to apply, but with additional studies. The master's degree programme in universities of applied sciences takes two years and can be undertaken in conjunction with regular work. After the master's degree, the remaining degrees (Licentiate and Doctor) are available only in universities. All master's degrees qualify their recipients for graduate studies at doctoral level.

The equivalence discussed above is only relevant when applying for public sector jobs.

In universities, membership in the students' union is compulsory. Students' unions in universities of applied sciences are similarly recognized in the legislation, but membership is voluntary and does not include special university student health care (which is organised and partly financed by the students' unions). Finnish students are entitled to a student benefit, which may be revoked if there is a persistent lack of progress in the studies.

Some universities provide professional degrees. They have additional requirements in addition to merely completing the studies, such as demonstrations of competence in practice. An example of such a degree is Lääketieteen lisensiaatti, medicine licentiat, Licentiate of Medicine. A Bachelor of Medicine (lääketieteen kandidaatti, medicine kandidat) is allowed to conduct clinical work under the supervision of senior medical staff. The Licentiate of Medicine is not equivalent to licentiate's degree in other fields, but to a master's degree. For this reason, no Licentiate's thesis is required unlike in other fields. The equivalent of a Medical Doctor in the U.S. sense is therefore not called "doctor", but licentiate. The research doctorate, which is equivalent to a PhD in Medicine, is called "Doctor of Medicine" (lääketieteen tohtori, medicine doktorsexamen).

After the master's degree, there are two further post-graduate degrees— an intermediate postgraduate degree, called Licentiate, and the doctoral (Doctorate) degree. A Licenciate programme has the same amount of theoretical education as a Doctor, but its dissertation work has fewer requirements. On the other hand, the requirements for a doctoral dissertation are a little bit higher than in other countries.

The most typical Finnish doctoral degree is Doctor of Philosophy (filosofian tohtori, filosofie doktorsexamen). However, universities of technology award the title Doctor of Science (Technology), tekniikan tohtori, teknologie doktorsexamen and there are several branch-specific titles, e.g., in medicine lääketieteen tohtori, medicine doktorsexamen, in art taiteen tohtori, and in social sciences valtiotieteen tohtori, politices doktorsexamen.

=== Tuition fees ===
Up until 2017, public universities in Finland did not collect tuition fees. However, since the 1990s there had been plans at government level to introduce tuition fees to students from outside the European Union/EEA. The students' organisations have opposed those plans.

Since the autumn semester 2017, students from outside the EEA have to pay tuition fees of at least 1,500 euros per year to study in Finland, while students from the EEA continue to study for free. Typical tuition fees for non-European students range from around 6,000 to around 18,000 euros per year depending on the university and programme. The goal of the fees was to "advance these institutions' opportunities for education export and also expand their funding base", "putting greater emphasis on educational quality as a competitive factor."

== Adult education ==
Completing secondary school on a vocational programme with full classes on a three-year curriculum provides a formal qualification for further studies. However, it may prove necessary to obtain post-secondary education before being admitted to a university, as the entrance examinations require a relatively high level of knowledge. Post-secondary education is provided by municipal schools or independent 'adult education centres', which can give either vocational education or teaching at comprehensive or upper secondary school levels. It is possible to obtain the matriculation diploma, or to better the comprehensive school grades, in these programmes. A new trade can also be learned by an adult at an adult education centre (aikuiskoulutuskeskus, vuxenutbildningscenter), for example, if structural change of the economy has made the old trade redundant.

In universities, the "Open University" (Finnish: Avoin yliopisto, Swedish: öppet universitet) programme enables people without student status to enroll in individual university courses. There are no requirements, but there is a modest tuition fee (e.g., 60 euros per course). Universities of applied sciences have their own similar programme (Finnish: Avoin ammattikorkeakoulu, Swedish: öppen högskola). While "Open University" students cannot pursue studies towards a degree, they may, after passing a sufficient number of separately determined courses with a sufficiently high grade point average, be eligible for transfer into an undergraduate degree program. Alternatively, a few institutions offer foreign qualifications, such as the private Helsinki School of Business, which offers the UK-accredited Higher National Diploma, enabling graduates to earn an undergraduate degree after completing a top-up year abroad.

A third branch of adult education is formed by the so-called vapaa sivistystyö, the "Free Education". This is formed by the partially state-funded, independent educational institutes offering diverse courses varying in length and academic level. The purpose of the "Free Education" is not to provide professional or degree-oriented education but to "support the multi-faceted development of personality, the ability to act in the community and to pursue the fulfilment of democracy, equality and diversity in the society." Historically, the "Free Education" stems from the late 19th century efforts to educate the general populace with little previous academic experience.

The "Free Education" is offered by

- 206 kansalaisopisto or työväenopisto (Citizens' or Workers' Institutes)
- 88 kansanopisto (People's Institutes)
- 14 Sports' training centres (Finnish: liikunnan koulutuskeskus)
- 20 Summer universities (Finnish: kesäyliopisto)
- 11 Study Centres (Finnish: opintokeskus)

The most common type of "Free Education" is a kansalaisopisto, sometimes called työväenopisto for historical reasons. These are mostly evening-type municipal institutions offering language, handicraft and humanities courses. The academic level varies strongly, and many courses do not require any requisite knowledge. The kansanopistos, on the other hand, are boarding-schools, often maintained by associations with either a strong ideological or religious mission. Also here, the academic level varies strongly. In all these institutions, the courses carry a modest tuition. The Sports' training centers are institutions for the professional or semi-professional sportsmen's training, while Summer universities and study centers are auxiliary bodies for the Organization of Free Education.

== Duties ==
The Minister of Education has the responsibility of electronically preserving and distributing public domain works. Finland has millions of public domain works (books, pictures, music and films) and views access to them as a basic human right of access to science and culture.

== Future prospects ==
The ongoing Bologna Process blurs the distinction between vocational and academic qualifications. In some fields, new postgraduate degrees have been introduced. Co-operation between the different systems is rising and some integration will occur (although not without a substantial amount of pressure). This results from not only the Bologna Process but also the goal of Finnish politicians— to educate the vast majority of Finns to a higher degree (ca. 60–70% of each annual cohort enter higher education).

In recent years, a cut in the number of new student places has often been called for by the economic sphere, as well as trade and student unions, because of an ongoing trend of rising academic unemployment, which is interpreted as a result of the steep increase in student places in higher education in the 1990s. In particular, some degrees in universities of applied sciences (AMK/YH) have suffered inflation. In a reflection of this current belief, the Ministry of Education has recently decreed a nationwide cut of 10% in new student places in universities of applied sciences to be applied starting from 2007 and 2008. It is still largely undecided whether (and when) some of those cuts could be redistributed to areas in need of a more highly educated workforce. In 2001 and 2002, university graduates had a 3.7% unemployment rate, and university of applied sciences graduates had 8%, which is on a par with the general unemployment rate (see the OECD report). In 2015, under prime minister Juha Sipilä's cabinet, the government decided to cut down on university funding by approximately €500 million.

An increase in vocational school student places might be preferred, as a shortage of basic workforce such as plumbers and construction workers is widely acknowledged in Finland. It should also be noted that retiring age groups are bigger than the ones entering higher education in Finland at present and for quite some time into the foreseeable future. If the current number of student places were kept unchanged to the year 2020, for example, Eastern Finland would have enough student places for 103% of the estimated size of the age group 19–21.

Leo Pahkin, a Counsellor of Education at the Finland National Board of Education stated "Finland's main exports are wood and heads, but now not wood so much".

=== Higher education system restructuring ===
Due to globalization and increasing competition for diminishing younger age groups, system-wide restructuring has been called for by the Ministry of Education. Since 2006, all institutions of higher education have been sharing methods of cooperation. The total number of institutions is expected to drop significantly within 10–15 years.

The process within universities began with merger of the University of Kuopio and the University of Joensuu into the University of Eastern Finland in 2010. In Helsinki, three local universities, namely Helsinki University of Technology, Helsinki School of Economics and University of Art and Design Helsinki, merged to a new Aalto University on 1 August 2009. Also several universities of applied sciences have announced mergers (such as Haaga and Helia, which merged into Haaga-Helia in 2007).

New methods of cooperation such as consortia and federations have been introduced within universities (e.g., University of Turku and Turku School of Economics Consortium). Partnerships between traditional universities and universities of applied sciences are also developing (e.g., the University of Kuopio and Savonia University of Applied Sciences formed the North Savo Higher Education Consortium). In general, such system-wide change closely follows the pattern established in Central Europe, the United States, Spain and Hungary.

== National Curriculum Framework 2016 ==
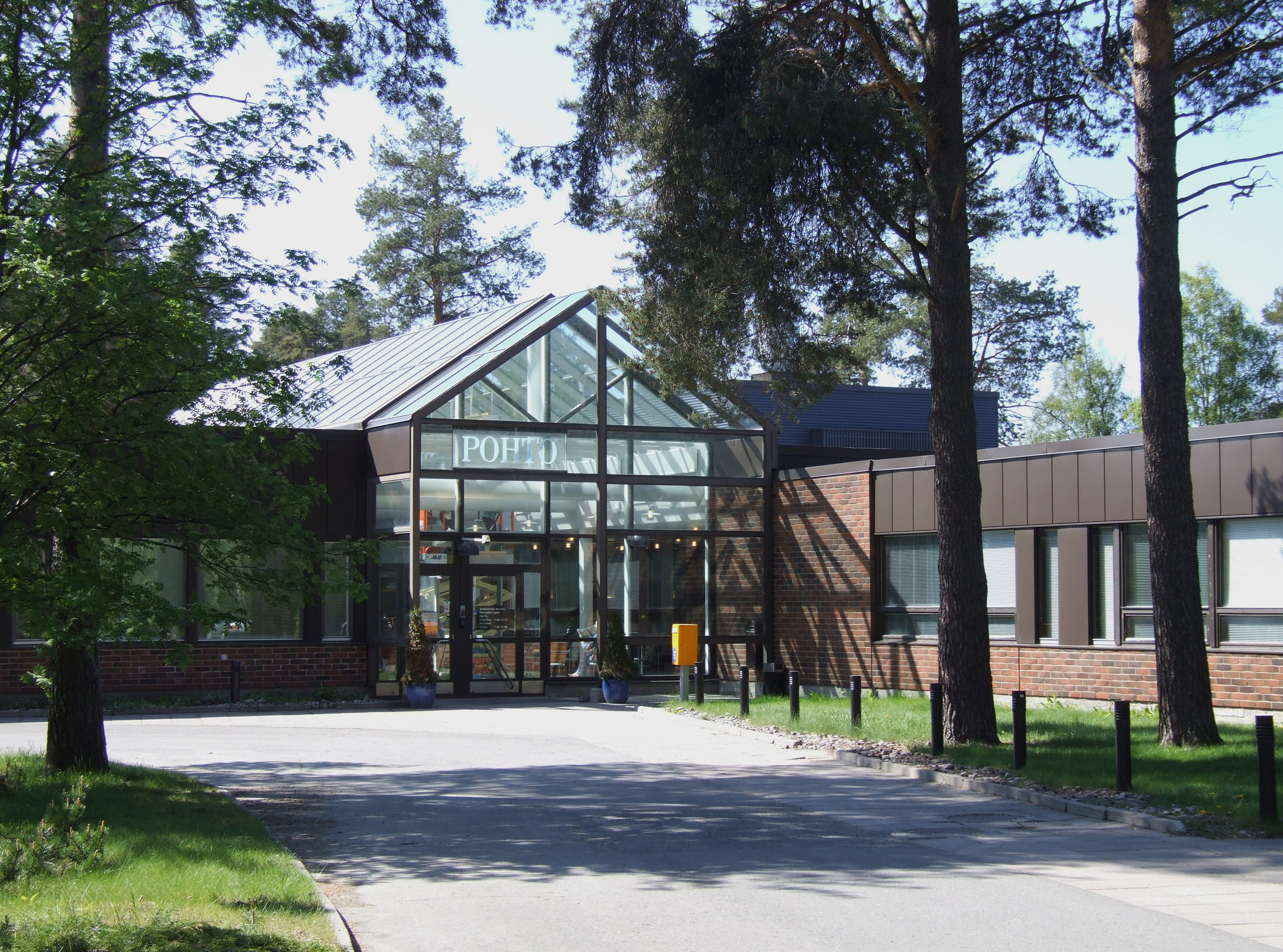
POHTO training institute for business and industry in Hietasaari, Oulu

Commencing in the 2016–2017 academic year, Finland will begin implementing educational reform that will mandate that phenomenon-based learning be introduced alongside traditional subject-based instruction. As part of a new National Curriculum Framework, it will apply to all basic schools for students aged 7–16 years old. Finnish schools have used this form of instruction since the 1980s, but it was not previously mandatory. It is anticipated that educators around the world will be studying this development as Finland's educational system is considered to be a model of success by many. This shift coincides with other changes that are encouraging development of 21st century skills such as collaboration, communication, creativity, and critical thinking.

== Finnish education abroad ==
=== Suomi-koulut and official Finnish curriculum schools ===
Finnish education is provided internationally through a variety of models. Some schools abroad, commonly known as Suomi-koulut, offer the official Finnish national curriculum and operate primarily in Finnish or Swedish. These institutions are intended for Finnish expatriate families and maintain a direct pedagogical link to the Finnish national education system. For example, schools in locations such as Fuengirola, Costa del Sol, Spain, serve Finnish children living overseas and uphold the language, structure, and values of education in Finland.

=== Finnish-style education and export models ===
In addition to officially Finnish-language institutions, several private schools around the world offer what is often referred to as “Finnish-style” or “Finnish-inspired” education. These schools typically operate within local regulatory frameworks but integrate key elements of the Finnish pedagogical model, such as play-based learning, child-centered approaches, and holistic well-being.

These models do not use the official Finnish curriculum in its entirety but are often developed in collaboration with Finnish education experts.^{[2]} While not part of the Finnish national school system, these schools represent the growing global interest in Finland's educational philosophy.

Examples of Finnish-style educational initiatives abroad include:

- Qatar-Finland International School, operated by EduCluster Finland, which combines local and Finnish practices and staff training.
- FinlandWay® Schools, a network of early childhood education franchises based on Finnish pedagogical design, with locations in countries including Australia, the United Kingdom, and Kuwait.

=== Education Finland programme ===
The Education Finland programme is a national education export initiative coordinated by the Finnish National Agency for Education (EDUFI) and funded by the Finnish Ministry of Education and Culture. The programme supports the internationalisation of Finnish educational expertise and promotes Finnish education solutions abroad.

Membership in the programme is open exclusively to companies registered and operating in Finland. Members offer a range of services, including early education concepts, curriculum solutions, teacher training, school leadership programmes, digital learning tools, and consulting services.

== Media and technology ==
In 2011, documentary filmmaker, Bob Compton, and Harvard researcher, Tony Wagner, researched the Finnish school system and its excellence. The result of their research is the film, "The Finland Phenomenon: Inside the World's Most Surprising School System."

In 2018, the University of Helsinki announced together with the Finnish tech company Reaktor that they would aim to educate 1% (the total of 54,000) of all Finns on the basics of artificial intelligence. The organizations said they want to make Finland "the world's most educated country in the field of artificial intelligence." The course is freely accessible to anyone anywhere online and has already garnered over 220,000 sign-ups.

== Languages ==
One of the competitive advantages in Finland has been their ability in foreign languages. All students learn at least two languages in addition to their mother tongue, mainly English and obligatory Finnish or Swedish, up to high school. A citizens' initiative to remove obligatory Swedish from education reached parliament in 2014, but failed to pass. Despite being a mandatory part of the national curriculum, more than half of all Finns consider themselves to be unable to understand Swedish at an elementary or near elementary level. Over half of Finns report that Swedish has been completely or almost completely useless for them in their personal lives.

== See also ==
- European Credit Transfer and Accumulation System
- Finnish National Agency for Education
- List of polytechnics in Finland
- List of schools in Finland
- List of universities in Finland
- Programme for International Student Assessment (PISA)
- University Admissions Finland
