= Tryggve Saxén =

Tryggve Saxén (April 7, 1920, in Vaasa – March 2, 1970, in Vaasa) was a Finnish mathematician and the first rector of the University of Vaasa, 1968–1970 (known as Vaasan kauppakorkeakoulu, Vaasa School of Economics at the time).

Saxén was also a professor of mathematical economics and statistics. He died at the age of 49.
