= Huittinen =

Huittinen Vittis
- Town
- Huittisten kaupunki Vittis stad
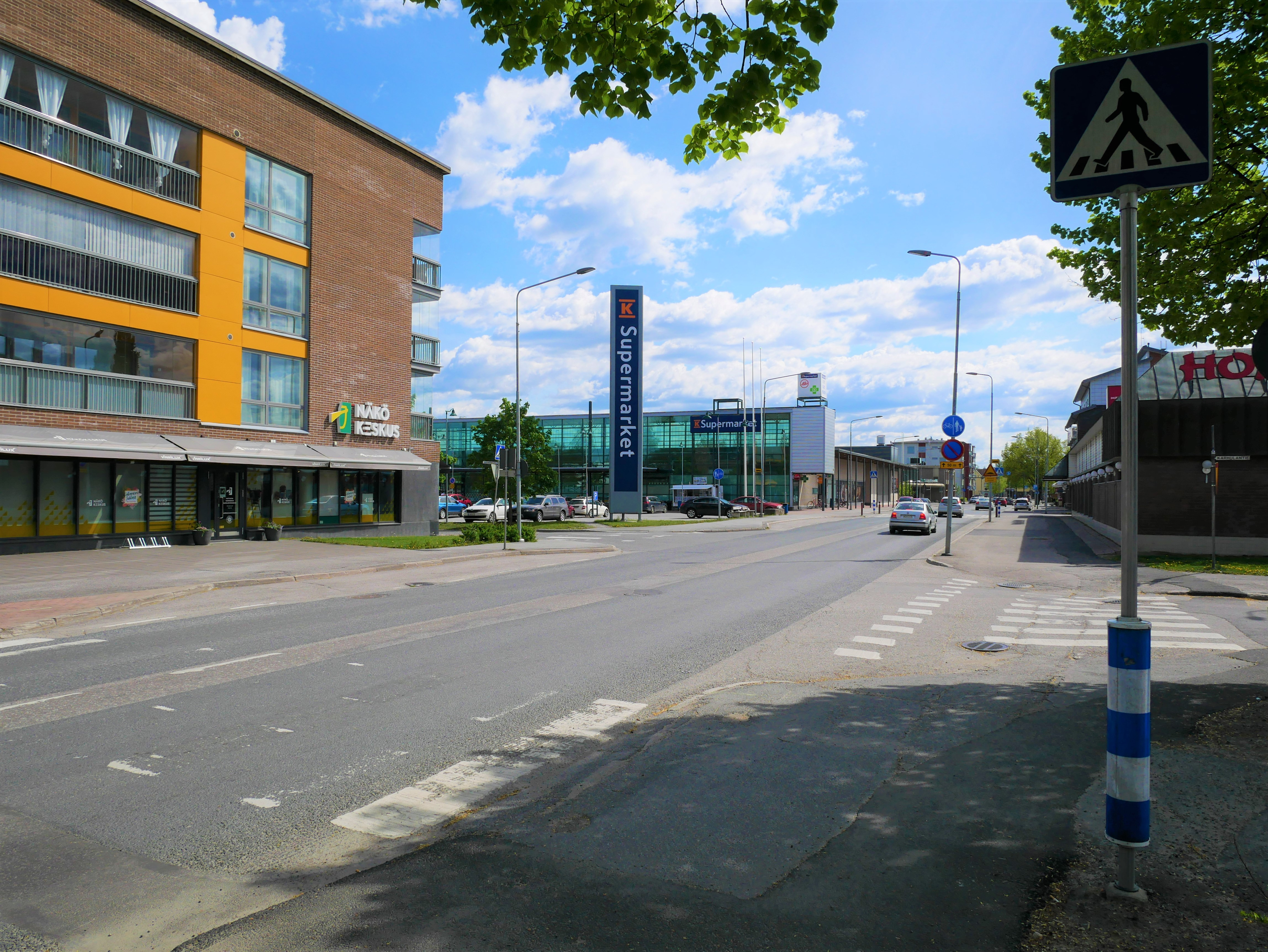
- A view from Lauttakylä, central Huittinen

- Coat of arms

- Location of Huittinen in Finland
- Interactive map of Huittinen
- Coordinates: 61°10.5′N 022°42′E
- Country: Finland
- Region: Satakunta
- Sub-region: Pori
- First records: 1414
- Charter: 1865
- Market town: 1972
- Town privileges: 1977
- Seat: Lauttakylä

Government
  - Town manager: Viveka Lanne

Area (2018-01-01)
  - Total: 539.59 km^{2} (208.34 sq mi)
  - Land: 532.65 km^{2} (205.66 sq mi)
  - Water: 6.97 km^{2} (2.69 sq mi)
  - Rank: 163rd largest in Finland

Population (2025-12-31)
  - Total: 9,546
  - Rank: 100th largest in Finland
  - Density: 17.92/km^{2} (46.4/sq mi)

Population by native language
  - Finnish: 93.7% (official)
  - Swedish: 0.2%
  - Others: 6.1%

Population by age
  - 0 to 14: 14.3%
  - 15 to 64: 56.3%
  - 65 or older: 29.4%
- Time zone: UTC+02:00 (EET)
  - Summer (DST): UTC+03:00 (EEST)
- Climate: Dfc
- Website: www.huittinen.fi

Huittinen (Swedish: Vittis) is a town and municipality in Finland. It is located in the Satakunta region, 63 kilometres (39 mi) southeast of Pori and 75 kilometres (47 mi) southwest of Tampere. The town has a population of 9,546 (31 December 2025) and covers an area of 539.59 square kilometres (208.34 sq mi) of which 6.97 km^{2} (2.69 sq mi) is water. The population density is 17.92 inhabitants per square kilometre (46.4/sq mi).

The town is unilingually Finnish. Municipality of Vampula was consolidated with Huittinen on 1 January 2009.

The Huittinen coat of arms is designed by Erkki Honkanen in 1953.

Risto Ryti, the president of Finland in 1940–44, was born in Huittinen in 1889.

== History ==
In 1904, one of Finland's most famous ancient objects, the Elk's Head of Huittinen from the Stone Age, was found in the village of Palojoki in Huittinen. It is now in the National Museum. In addition to the artefact finds, there is a comb ceramic residence in Korkeakoski and a younger burial site in Sammu village, as well as some cemeteries. Researchers have concluded that the Huittinen got their first inhabitants mainly from the northwest, from the direction of the lower course of the Kokemäenjoki.

Huittinen is mentioned as a churchwarden in 1414. The gray stone church of the Huittinen was built at the end of the 15th century. The church burned down in 1783 and a high tower was added during the repair. On flat terrain, the tower can be seen far into the surroundings. Before the stone church, there was a wooden church in Huittinen.

The Juusela farm in Nanhia village has been considered the seat of the Juslenius family. The most famous member of the family was bishop Daniel Juslenius. Vicar Nils Idman Sr., known for his financial and scientific interests, also came from the same house. Archbishop Erkki Kaila's father, Jonatan Johansson, served as assistant keeper of Huittinen in the 1860s.

Lauttakylä, the center of Huittinen, became Southwest Finland's most important land transport hub long before the age of cars. The railways were far away and the waterways were not navigable for long distances. However, a passenger ship operated from Lauttakylä along the Kokemäenjoki to the Kyttälä railway station on the Tampere–Pori line right from the completion of the line until the 1930s. Lauttakylä was born at the intersection of the old Helsinki–Pori and Turku–Tampere roads, where Loimijoki was crossed by ferry. Bus service from Lauttakylä to all directions started as early as the early 1920s.

West Finland College, founded in 1892 in the village of Loima, Huittinen, is the oldest Finnish-speaking Folk High School in the country.

== Geography ==
In terms of surface forms, Huittinen is mostly flat and the lowest areas are located along the rivers in the central part of the city. The bedrock, which is mostly granodiorite, is not visible anywhere in the city area. The highest hills, reaching more than 100 meters above sea level, are located in the south in the direction of Vampula. Well-known viewpoints are Ripovuori, Kännönvuori and Korkeakallio. A ridge section runs through Huittinen, which comes from the northwest from the Kokemäki side and continues through Huhtamo to the Punkalaidun side.

== Religion ==
According to the 2018 regional distribution, Huittinen has the following congregations of the Evangelical Lutheran Church of Finland:

- Huittinen congregation
  - Vampula chapel congregation

Among the congregations of the Finnish Orthodox Church, the Turku Orthodox congregation operates in the Huittinen area.

== Economy ==
The Jokisivu gold mine in Huittinen is operated by Polar Mining, with an annual production of around 300–400 kilos of gold.

== Transport ==
Thanks to its location, Huittinen is a very busy hub for bus traffic. The current bus station was completed in 1965. Before Huittisten became a town, Lauttakylän Auto was Finland's largest company operating bus services from the rural municipality, and Huittinen bus station was Finland's busiest rural bus station.

There is no train station in Huittinen, but there is a section of the Tampere–Pori railway line of about one hundred metres running in the municipality's territory – at the northern end of Kuukinmaantie. The nearest train stations are in Kokemäki and Sastamala.

== International relations ==
=== Twin towns — Sister cities ===
Huittinen is twinned with:

- Keila, Estonia
- Odda, Norway
- Stenungsund, Sweden
- Frederiksværk, Denmark
- Hoyerswerda, Germany

== See also ==
- Finnish national road 2
- Finnish national road 12
