= Lauttakylä =

Coordinates: 61°10′34″N 22°41′53″E

Lauttakylä is the administrative center of Huittinen, Finland. It is located on the southeast side of the confluence of the Loimijoki and the Punkalaitumenjoki. The Huittinen church is also located in Lauttakylä. The postal code of Lauttakylä is 32700 Huittinen, before January 1, 1980 the name of the post office was Lauttakylä.
