= University Admissions Finland =

University Admissions Finland (UAF) was a centralised application service for international Master's degree student applicants for eleven Finnish universities. After the application round for the autumn 2018 intake, University Admissions Finland closed down and the application processing was transferred over to each individual university for the future application rounds.

University Admissions Finland processed the applications, which included credential evaluation and verification of language skills. After UAF’s processing, the universities did the academic evaluation of the applications and carried out student selections. The admission requirements were set by the universities.

Universities that used UAF application service:

- Hanken School of Economics
- Lappeenranta University of Technology
- University of Eastern Finland
- University of Helsinki
- University of Jyväskylä
- University of Lapland
- University of Oulu
- University of Tampere
- University of Turku
- University of Vaasa
- Åbo Akademi University

== See also ==
- Education in Finland
- List of universities in Finland
