= Alppila Upper Secondary School =

Coordinates: 60°11′30″N 24°56′22″E

- Alppilan lukio
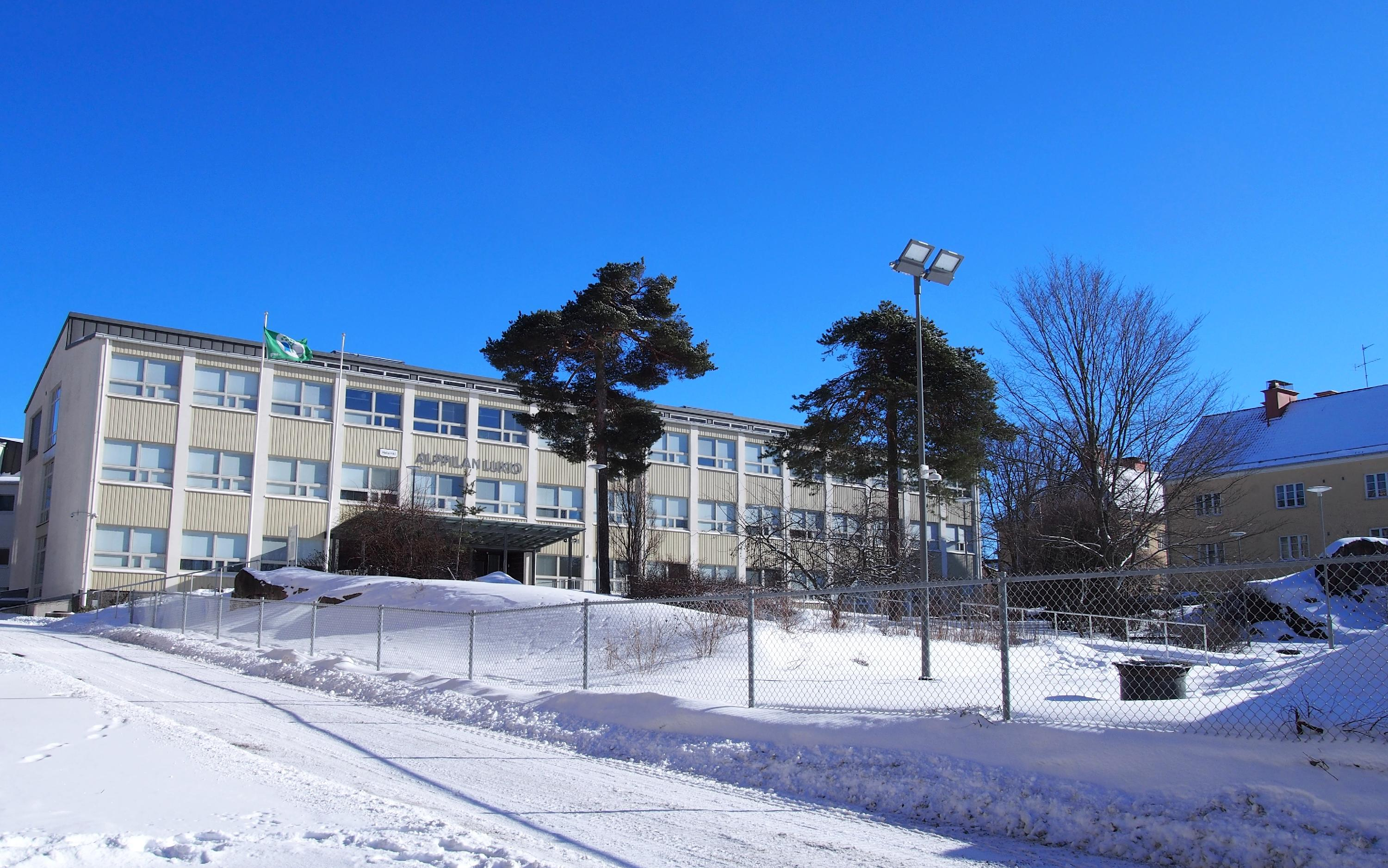

Location
- Viipurinkatu 21; Helsinki, 00510; Finland

Information
- Established: 1959
- Principal: Susanna Kalmari
- Teaching staff: 30
- Age range: 16+
- Colors: Blue and green
- Sports: Football, basketball, floor ball, rink bandy
- Team name: AC AlppilaCity FC United
- Newspaper: Apropoo
- Website: www.alppl.edu.hel.fi

Alppila Upper Secondary School (Finnish: Alppilan Lukio) is a school located in Helsinki, Finland. The school was founded in 1959. The current principal is Susanna Kalmari. There are around 700 students.

== Notable alumni ==
- Paavo Arhinmäki, Member of the Parliament of Finland
- Renny Harlin, director
