= Laanila Highschool =

Laanila High School
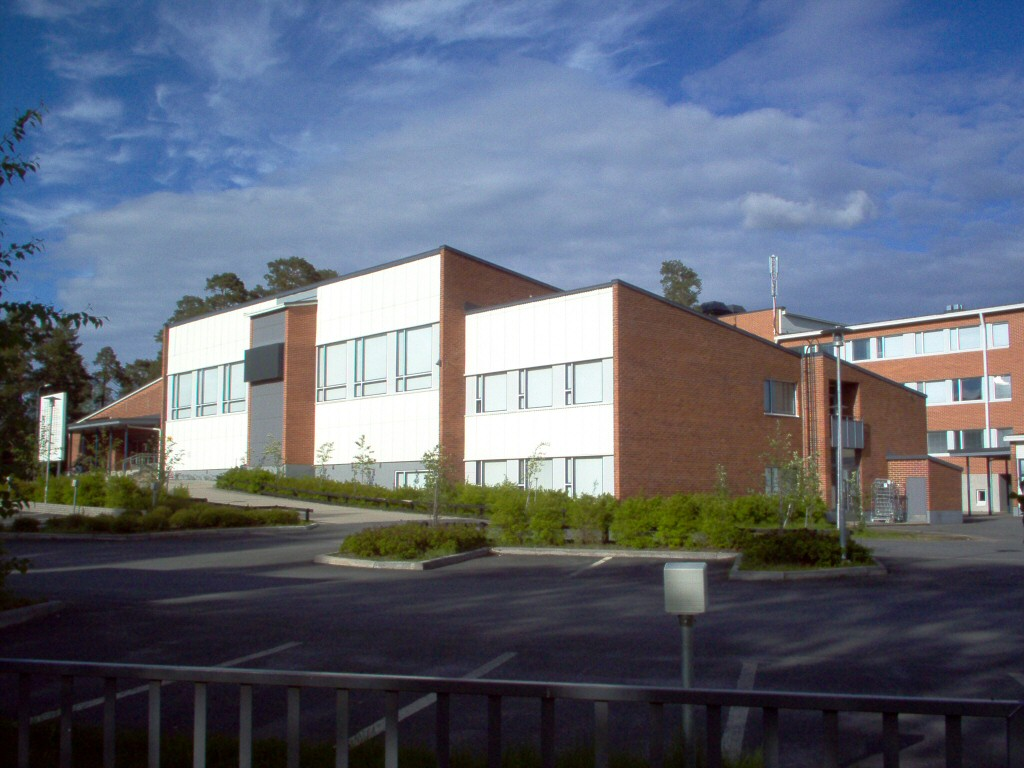

Location
- Hintantie 66, 90650 Oulu; Finland
- Coordinates: 65.02377°N 25.52016°E

Information
- Motto: rakkauden laanila (love's laanila)
- Established: 1957
- Principal: Timo Kärkkäinen
- Enrollment: 310
- Website: www.laanilanlukio.fi/General_information.htm

Laanila High School (Finnish: Laanilan lukio) is an upper secondary school in Oulu, Finland that was founded in 1957. There are currently about 310 pupils in it with around 32 staff members. The high school shares a building with Laanila intermediate school. Even though both of the schools are named after the Laanila district, they are actually located in the district of Hintta, an area next to Laanila. The current "motto" is rakkauden laanila (love's laanila in English)

== History ==
The school has had multiple different names since its founding in 1957. The names have changed due to education system reforms in Finland during the 1960s and 1970s and it has gone by the high school name since 1974. The building has been expanded in the 1960s and '80s and renovated into its current form in 2002.

== Programs ==
The school is a member of a sustainable development program and the Unesco ASPnet. Internationally It has also participated in the European union Erasmus program since 2011 as well as being a Certilingua certified school. The school offers a variety of classes for its high school students including special classes in physical education, human biophysics and chemistry, drama, social psychology, sign language and home economics.

== Sources ==
1. Website of Laanila Highschool (International version with outdated interface)
2. Current website in Finnish (All school websites were integrated into the cities website)
3. https://www.ouka.fi/oulu/laanilan-lukio/koulun-esittely Retrieved 18 April 2020 (City school information in Finnish)
4. https://www.ouka.fi/oulu/laanilan-lukio/henkilokunta Retrieved 18 April 2020 (School staff member list in Finnish)
