= Salo Upper Secondary School =

- Salon lukio
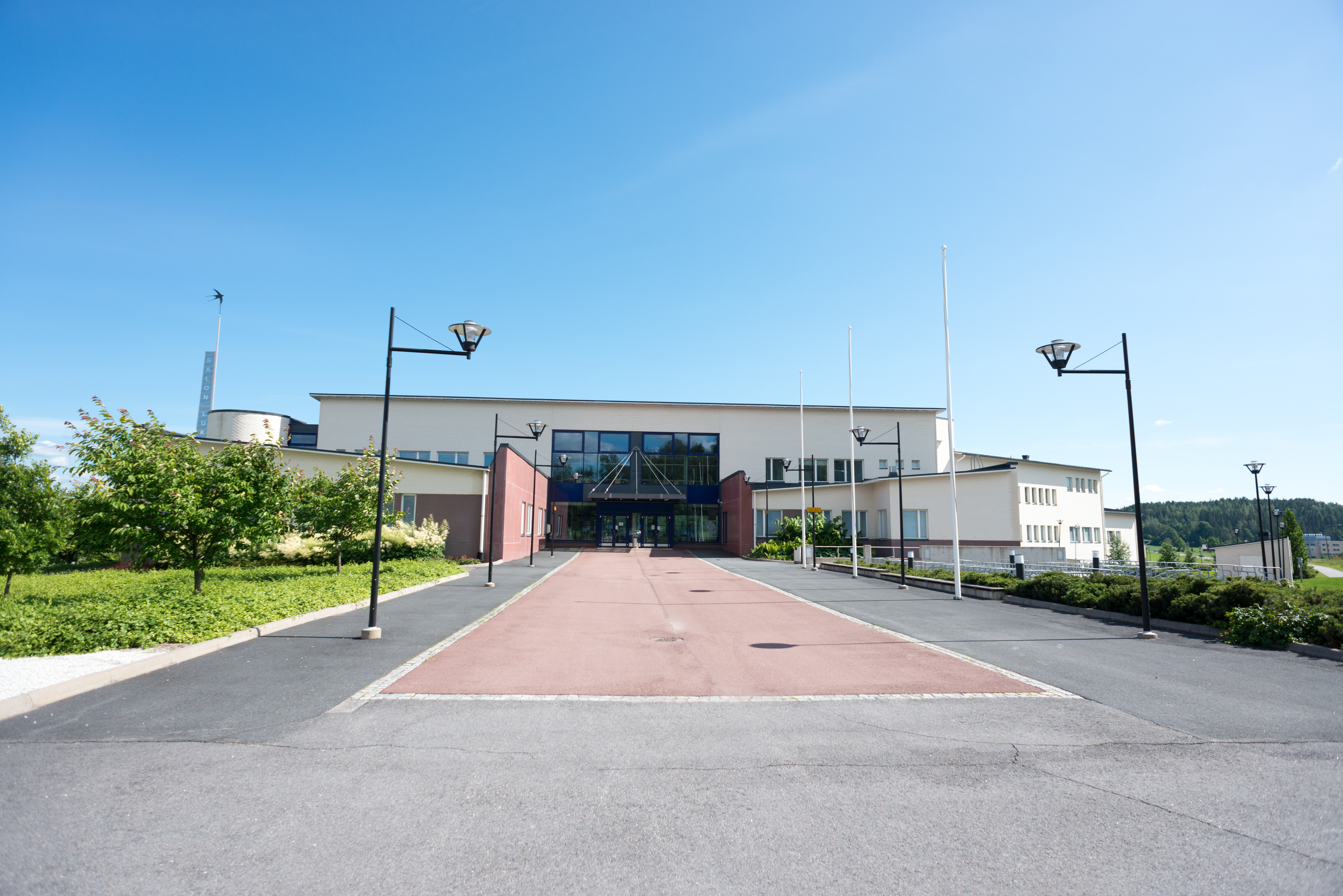
- Salo Upper Secondary School

Location
- Kaherinkatu 2 Salo; Finland
- Coordinates: 60.37622°N 23.13688°E

Information
- Type: Upper secondary school
- Established: August 1, 2005
- Headmaster: Juha-Markus Koistinen
- Staff: ~60

Salo Upper Secondary School (Finnish: Salon lukio) is the biggest upper secondary school in Salo, Finland. It has a capacity of 600 students and around 50 staff members including about 40 teachers, cleaners, cooks and secretaries. The new upper secondary school building offers its services to two schools, the upper secondary school that works there in the day times and upper secondary school for adults or in other words evening or night school. Salo night school offers high school level education for adults and students of the primary high school.

== History ==
In the year of 2005 the facilities on the Kaheri site were finished and the two former upper secondary schools of Salo (Hermanni and Lauri) were combined. The new school was established due to many years of lack of space. Lauri and Hermanni upper secondary schools used to work in the same space as the junior highs with the same names. The number of students increased year by year.

=== Building ===
Salo upper secondary school is a modern ivory colored building on the outskirts of Salo center. It has 33 classes all of them equipped with modern AV technology: VHS-DVD recorders, WolfVision documentary cameras, video projectors and computers. There is also an increasing number of Smart Boards.

The hall is the first thing to be entered when coming to the building from the main entrance. Immediately to the right there is the cafeteria and on the left there are the racks and the school office along with the auditorium. Behind the racks there are the arts and music classes. In front of the entrance there is the janitor's office.

From beside the janitor's office there is a pair of staircases leading to the upper and lower levels. The stairs going to the lower level leads to the gym and science and math classes. On the same level as the cafeteria there are the language classes. On the upper level there are the humanitarian sciences and Finnish. Also the library, multimedia class and separate study booths are in the upper level. Most of the classes expand to the left side of the building.

The yard consists of a volleyball court, a garden and two parking lots: one pointing towards Kisko and one towards Perniö. The garden is designed to portray the Solar System.

== Academics ==
Salo upper secondary school concentrates on general education. It coaches its students to get through baccalaureate needed to become a university student. In the teaching technology, internationality, self-expression and entrepreneurship are used as basic tools. The school has a special musical program that collaborates with the musical classes in junior high. There are also special courses for athletes: ice hockey, Finnish baseball, basketball, soccer and volleyball. There is a possibility to complete music, arts and athletic diplomas that have a positive effect while applying to university or polytechnic.

== Extracurricular activities ==
The school has its own Chess Club that has done very well in Finland's championship games (also known as SM). The school has a Press club and a Website Management Team that work together in updating the school's website and keeping the students informed of upcoming events and the school's success. Another extracurricular activity is called the VideoTeam. It works on filming the schools special activities, like concerts and contests.
