= University Consortium of Pori =

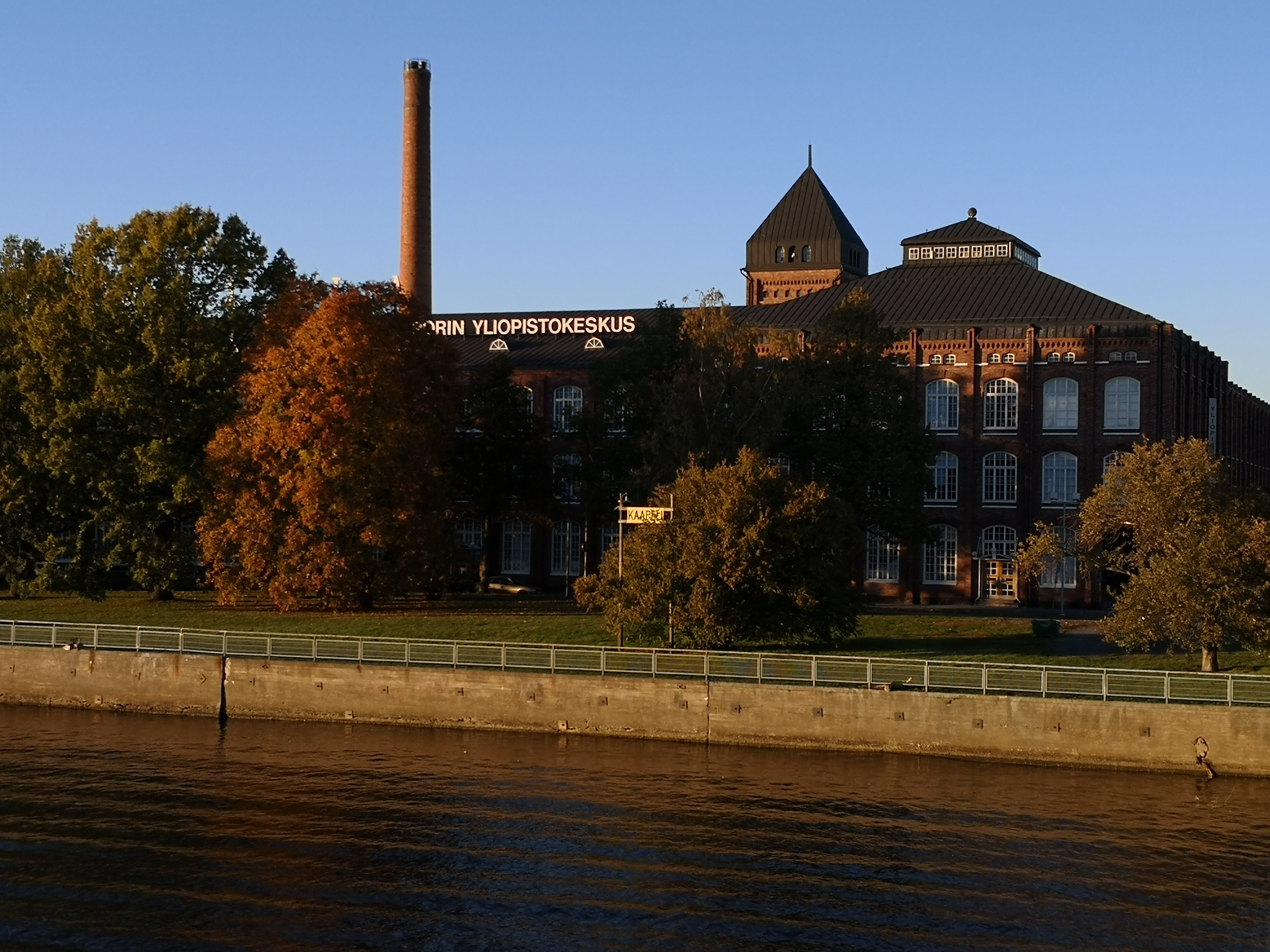
The University Consortium of Pori in its early October evening glory

University Consortium of Pori (UCPori, Finnish: Porin yliopistokeskus, Swedish: Björneborgs universitetscenter) is one of six university consortiums of Finland, located in Pori. The mother universities have the responsibility for operations. The coordinating university of UCPori is Tampere University of Technology. The UCPori Coordination Unit coordinates and promotes cooperation with/between university units in UCPori, mother universities, other higher education institutions and regional actors. Professor Jari Multisilta follows Harri Peltoniemi and Martti Sinisalmi as the director of UCPori since November 2014.

UCPori was established in 2004. The objectives of UCPori are to increase the level of education, to enhance know-how and to support the region's development and internationalization. In education the focus of UCPori is on undergraduate and postgraduate degree programmes, multidisciplinary cross-studying and adult education.

Today, UCPori is a centre of nearly 3 000 students, 170 experts and four universities operating networked in a multi-science environment. UCPori offers education in art, economics, culture, industrial management, technology and social sciences. The mother universities are Tampere University of Technology, University of Tampere and University of Turku.

UCPori is located in the city of Pori at the Satakunta region on Western Finland. The campus is placed on a former cotton mill by the river Kokemäenjoki.
