= Helsingin yhteislyseo =

Coordinates: 60°13′51″N 25°05′23″E

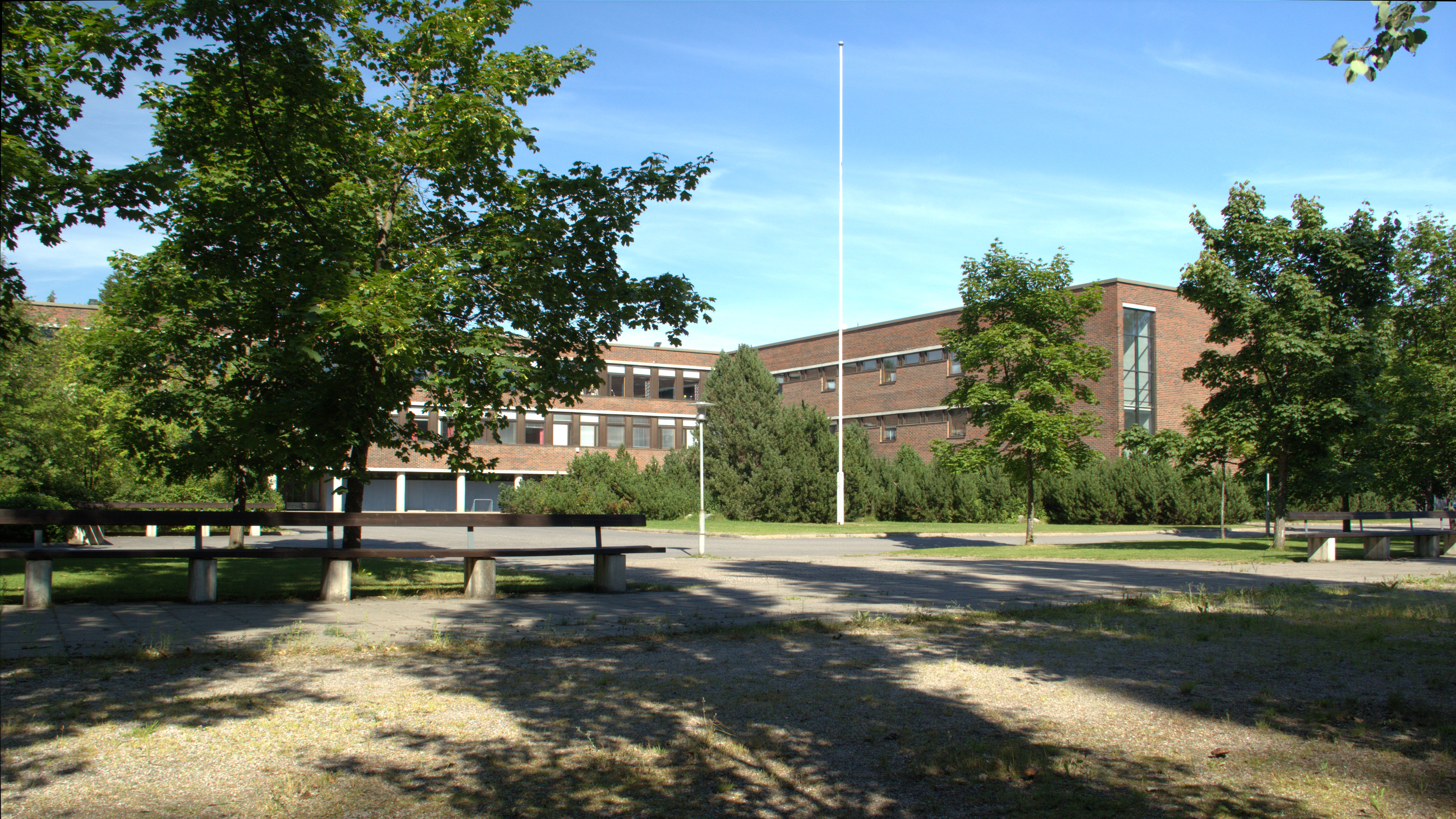

Information
- Established: 1908; 118 years ago
- Teaching staff: c.50
- Enrollment: c.700

Helsingin yhteislyseo (HYL) is a school in Kontula, Helsinki Finland consisting of a lower secondary school and an upper secondary school with over 50 teachers and 700 students in total. The school was founded in 1908 and it is privately maintained by Maanviljelyslyseo (Agricultural Lyceum). The school celebrated its 100th birthday in 2008.

Helsingin yhteislyseo and Lapinlahden yhteislyseo relocated to a new building and to its present location on the Rintinpolku street in Kontula in 1971. The two schools joined to operate under the same name Helsingin yhteislyseo from 1974 onward.

Upper secondary school applicants must choose between emphasized ability and art studies (830) and general studies (0176). Selection criteria are slightly higher for emphasized than general studies as they involve passing an entrance examination in sports, art or music. Students who pass may be at an advantage when applying for a future job or a student place once they graduate from Helsingin yhteislyseo.

== Notable events ==
In spring 2011 Helsingin yhteislyseo participated in Stage, a Finnish television show where six schools competed for the best school musical. Helsingin yhteislyseo claimed the fifth place.

== See also ==
- Education in Finland
