= University of Vaasa =

University in Vaasa, Finland

- Vaasan yliopisto
- Type: Public
- Established: 1968; 58 years ago
- Affiliations: ERASMUS, NORDPLUS
- Rector: Minna Martikainen
- Faculty: 428
- Administrative staff: 228
- Students: 5885
- Undergraduates: 2883
- Postgraduates: 2410
- Doctoral students: 296
- Location: Wolffintie 32, FIN-65101, Vaasa, Ostrobothnia, Finland; 63.10552°N 21.59286°E
- Campus: Urban
- Website: www.uwasa.fi

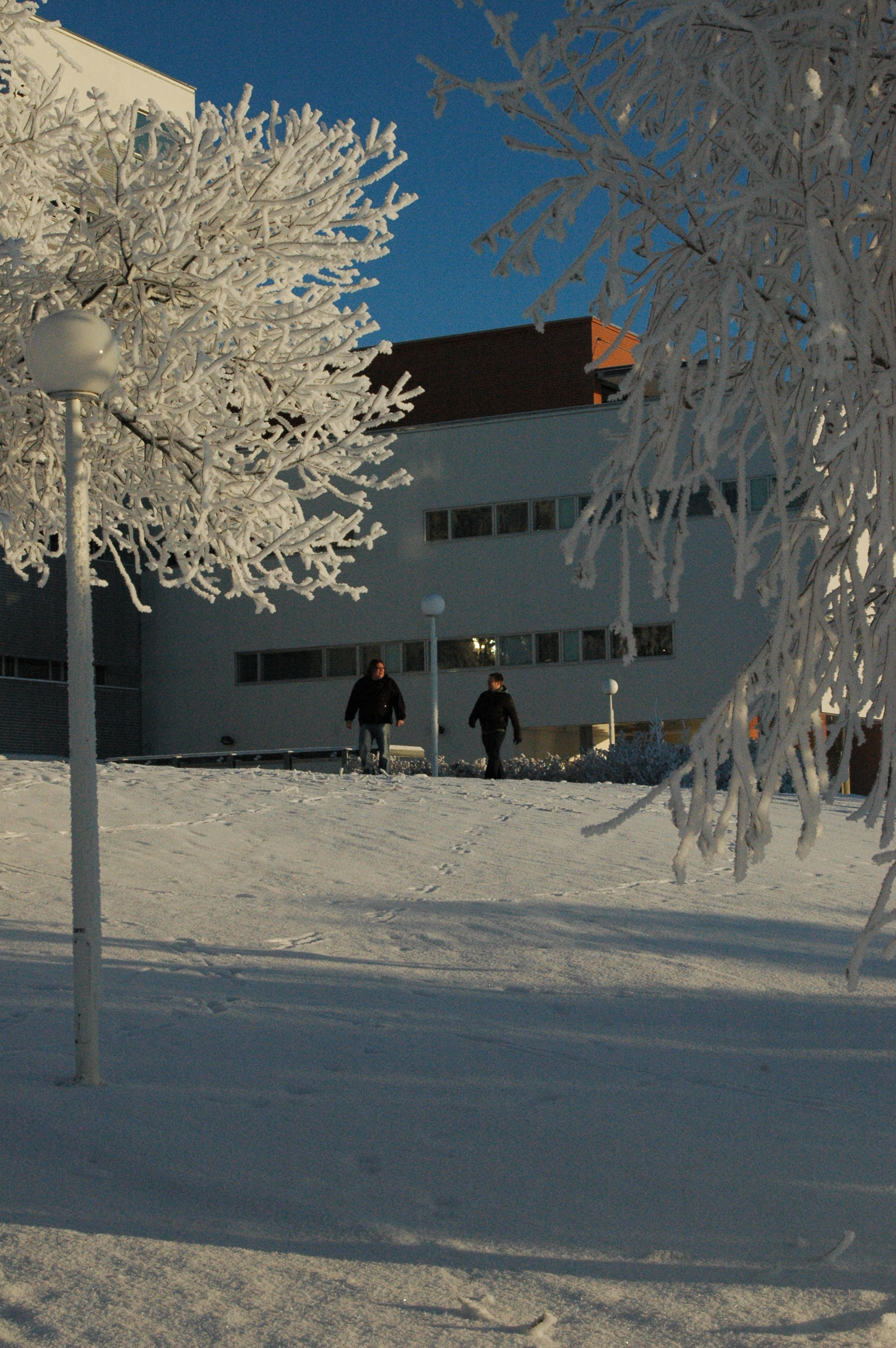
The former building of academic library Tritonia on a sunny November day in 2010.

The University of Vaasa (Finnish: Vaasan yliopisto, Swedish: Vasa universitet) is a multidisciplinary, business-oriented university in Vaasa, Finland. The campus of the university is situated by the Gulf of Bothnia adjacent to downtown Vaasa. The university has evolved from a school of economics founded in 1968 to a university consisting of four different schools: The School of Accounting and Finance, The School of Management, The School of Marketing and Communications and the School of Technology and Innovations. University of Vaasa is one of the largest business universities in Finland. The university has personnel of around 600 which includes an academic staff of 428 professors, teachers and researchers. Around 6000 students are currently studying in various degree programs at the university.

Studies at the University of Vaasa include business studies, technology, as well as administrative and communication sciences. The university focuses on sustainable business, energy, and society. Its strategic focus areas are the energy transition and technology, business management, and governance and society.

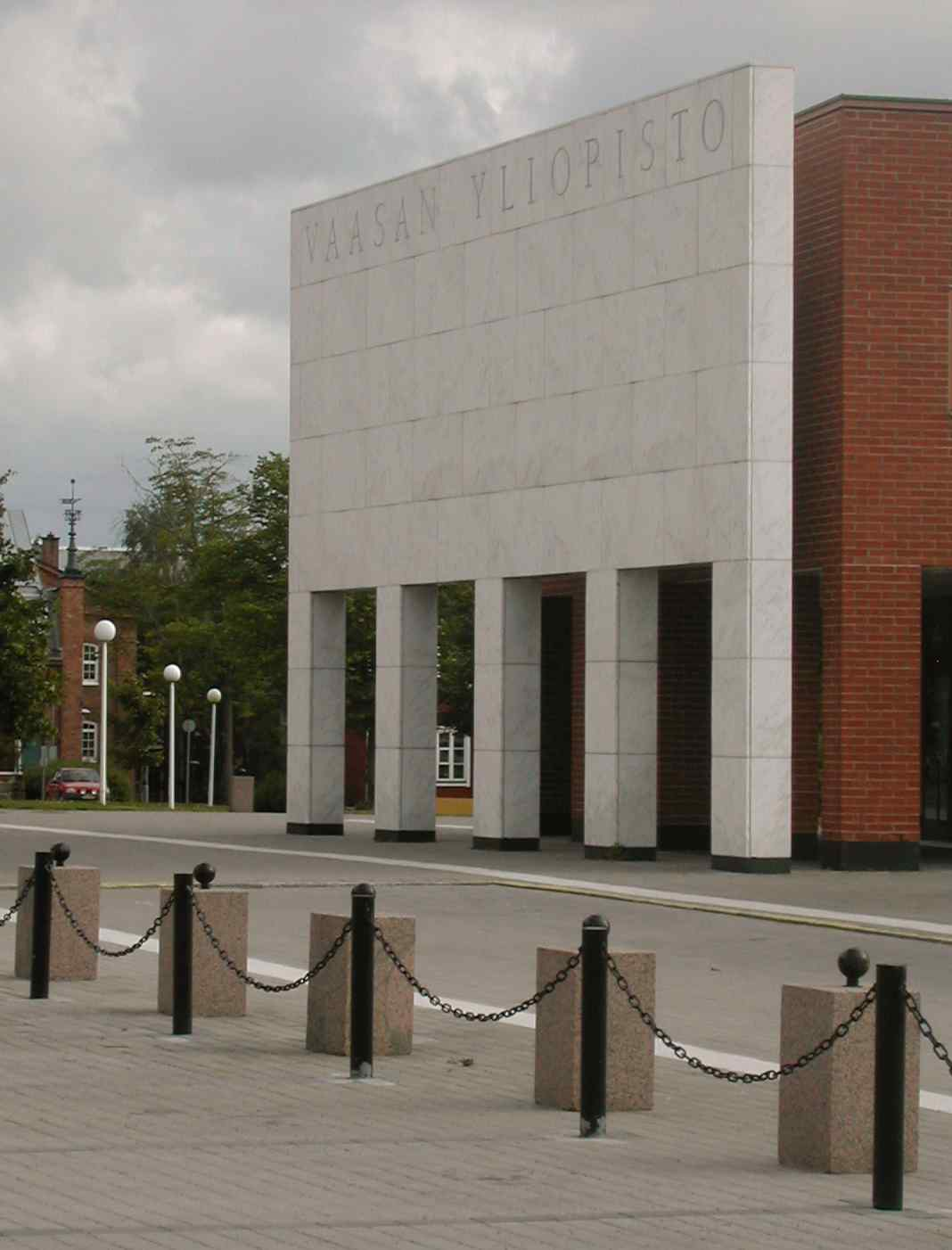
A modern marble arch in front of the university's main entrance.

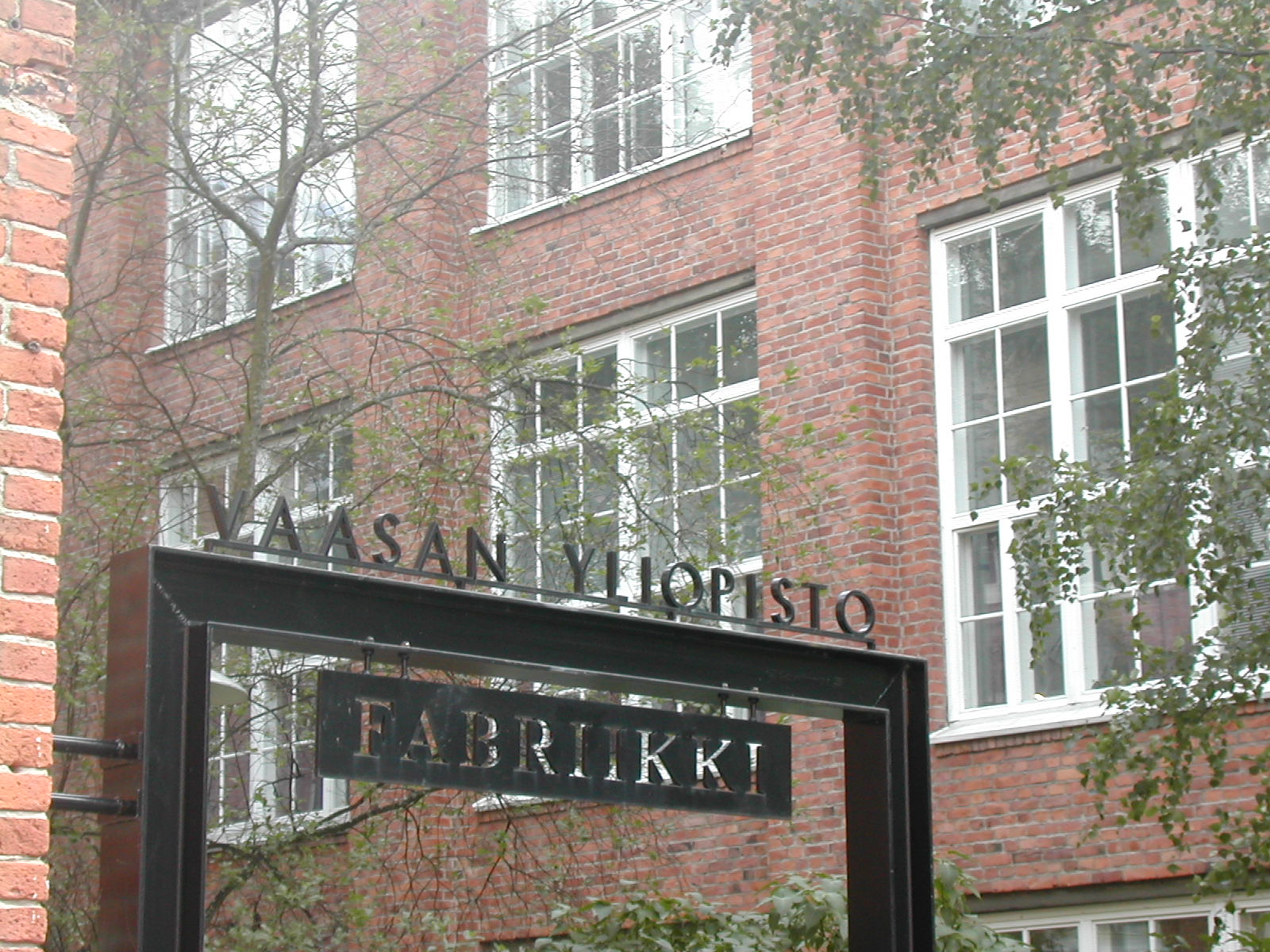
Part of the university is housed in a former cotton mill. This part is called Fabriikki.

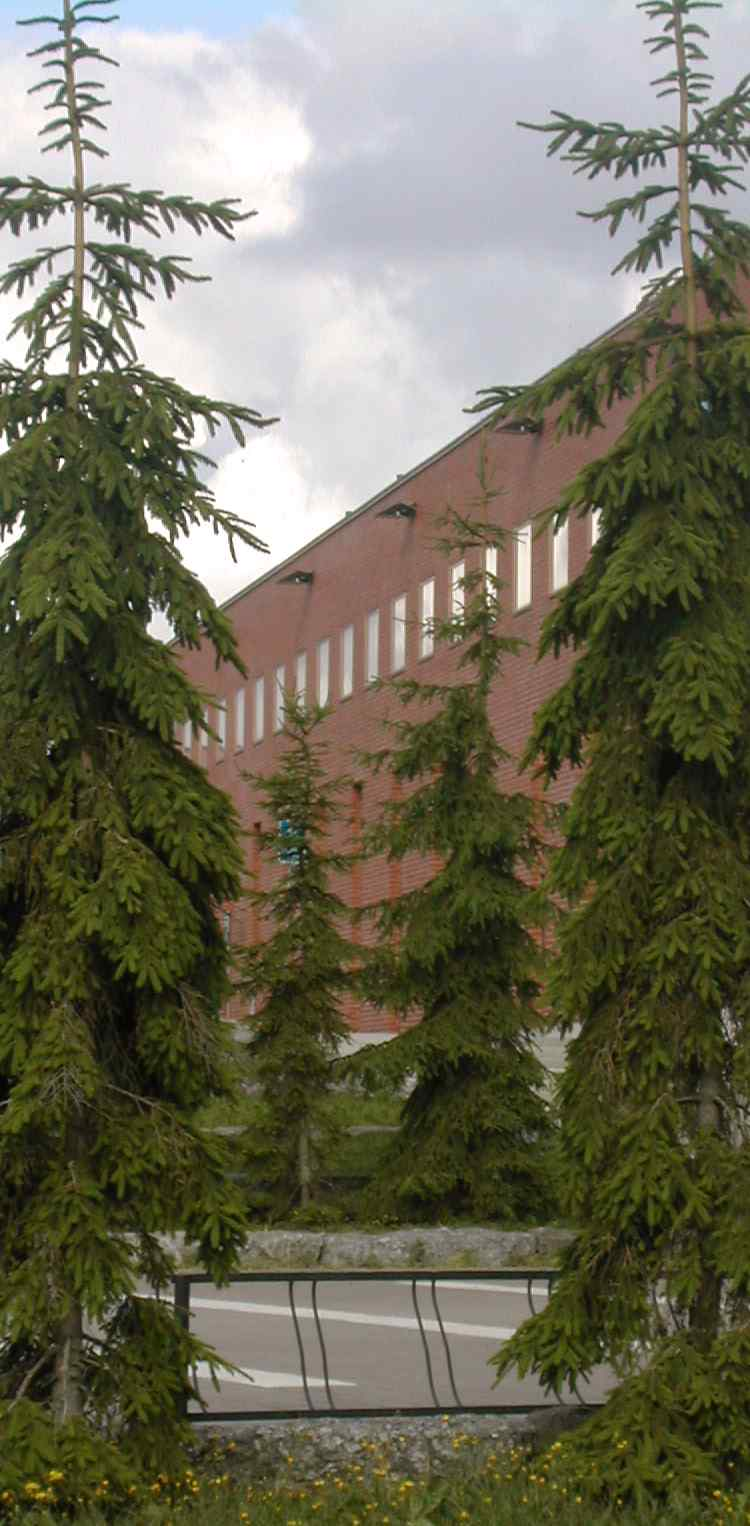
Part of the main building called Tervahovi photographed from the university's parking lot.

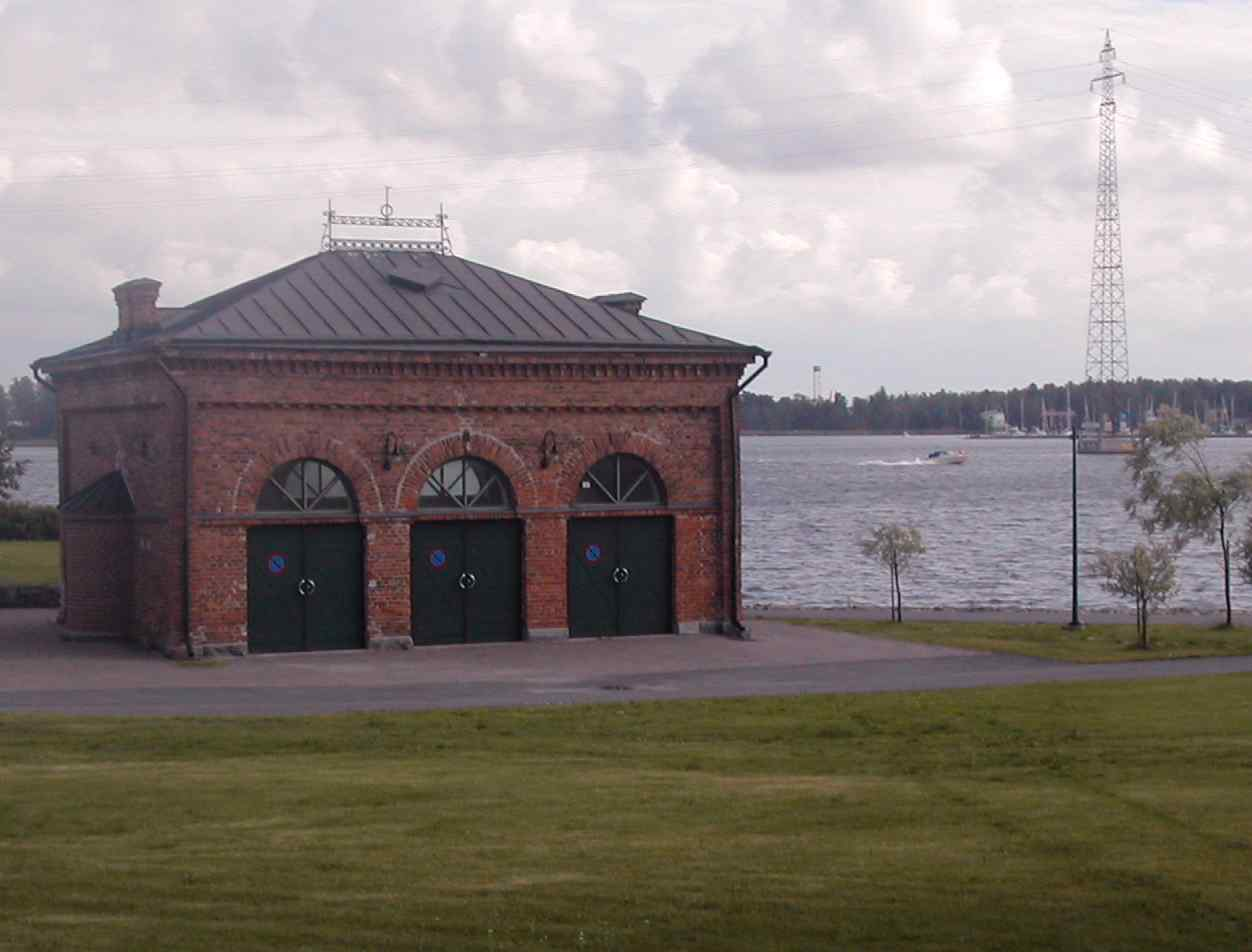
The campus area of University of Vaasa is sometimes called the most beautiful campus in Finland.

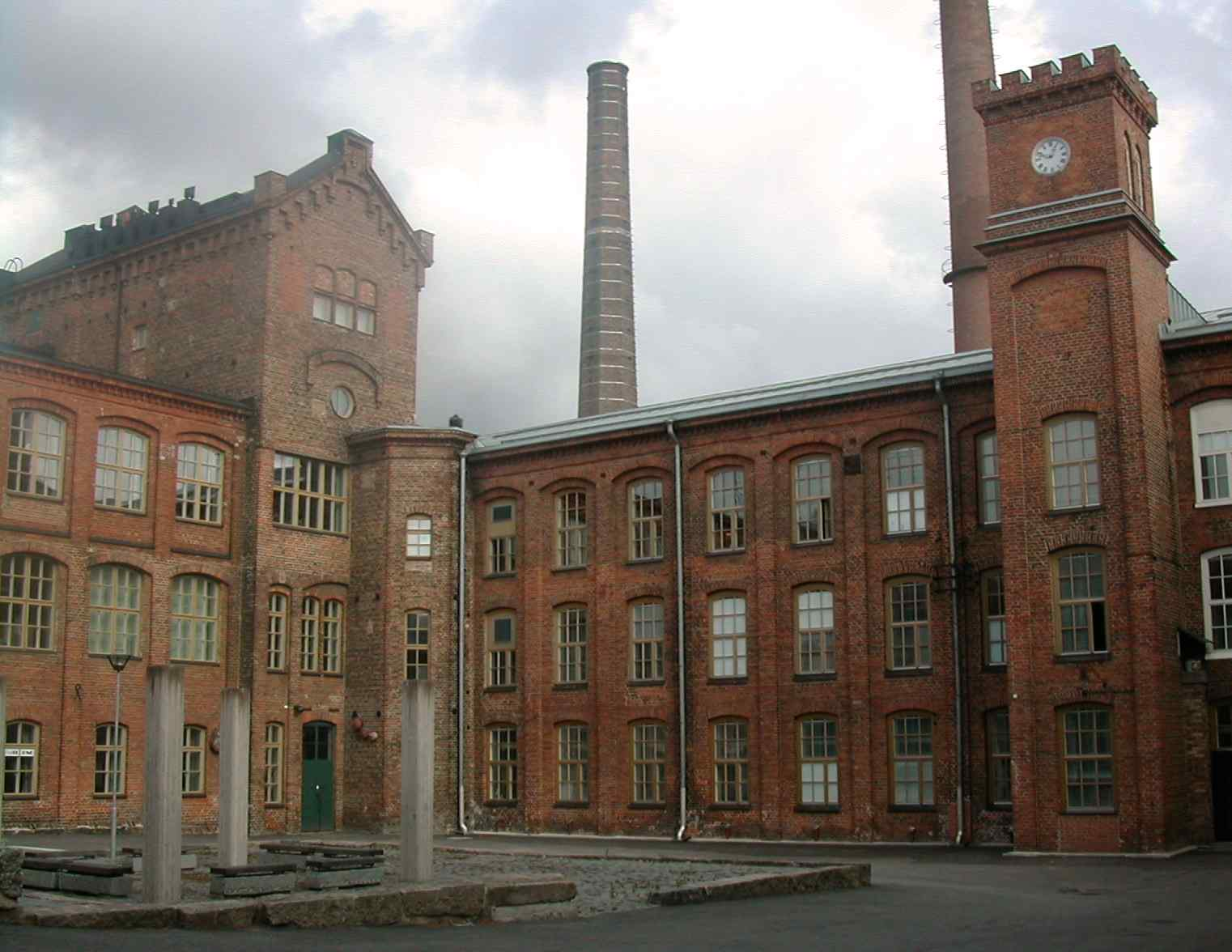
The former cotton mill has been extensively rebuilt on the inside to house parts of the university.

== History ==
In 1966 the Council of State made the decision to establish a School of Economics and Business Administration in Vaasa, and so Vaasa got its first institution of higher education which the region of Vaasa had worked for since the 1940s. The very next year the first students started their studies; 90 business and 60 correspondence students. The first principal to be chosen for the school was Tryggve Saxén and the first vice principal was Mauri Palomäki, who later would become the longest serving principal the school has seen so far. The lectures were first held in a yard building of Vaasa Commercial College in Raastuvankatu street, but in its second year the school moved into the whole house as the commercial college moved to a new building.

In 1977 the school became a state institution along with all other academic institutions in Finland.

In 1980 education in Humanities (languages) began and so the school became a "School of higher education" (in Finland the term is "Korkeakoulu"). In 1983 studies in the Social Sciences began and in 1990 Technology studies began in connection with Helsinki University of Technology. In 1991 it changed its name to University of Vaasa. In 1992 the school was organised into four faculties; The Humanities, Business Administration, Accounting and Industrial Management, and Social Sciences. In 1994 the university moved into its new premises on Palosaari. The university got the right to award master's degrees in Technology in 2004. In 2010 the university also reorganized its faculties to three, namely Faculty of Business Studies, Faculty of Technology and Faculty of Philosophy which includes previous faculties of Humanities and Social Sciences. In 2018 the university reorganised its structure again. Instead of three faculties, the University of Vaasa has four different schools: the School of Accounting and Finance, the School of Management, the School of Marketing and Communication studies and the School of Technology and Innovations.

== Campus ==
The university can be found in the neighbourhood of Palosaari beside the city's old cotton mill, which also houses part of the university. Each building has its own name, like the main building of "Tervahovi" (English: Pinetar Court) and "Ankkuri" (English: Anchor). The part of the university placed in the old mill is called "Fabriikki" (English: Factory). There is also the academic library of Tritonia, which the university shares with the other academic institutions in the city, and the laboratory of Technobothnia, which is shared with the city's two universities of applied sciences.Two of the newer buildings were finished in 1994 and planned in the spirit of the former county architect Carl Axel Setterberg who planned most of Vaasa's public buildings in 1860. Ankkuri building (former library) was finished in 2021. The whole campus is near the waterfront and surrounded by park areas. It is sometimes called the most beautiful campus in Finland.

== Schools ==
There are fours schools at the University of Vaasa:

- School of Management
  - Human Resource Management
  - Public Law
  - Public Management
  - Regional Studies
  - Social and Health Management
  - Strategic Management
- School of Accounting and Finance
  - Accounting and Finance
  - Business Law
  - Economics
- School of Marketing and Communications
  - Communication studies
  - International Business
  - Marketing
- School of Technology and Innovations
  - Mathematics and Statistics
  - Electrical Engineering and Energy Technology
  - Computer Science
  - Production

== Education and research ==
The University of Vaasa is a business oriented and multi-disciplinary university. It offers education possibilities on the following levels:

- Bachelor's programmes
- Master's programmes
- Doctoral programme
- Open University
- Continuing education
- Studies for exchange students

The strategic areas of research are management and change, energy and sustainable development and financing and economic decision making. University of Vaasa has fours schools and four research platforms: Vaasa Energy Business Innovation Centre (VEBIC), Digital Economy, Innovation and Entrepreneurship InnoLab, and Preparedness and Resilience (PREP).

== Services ==
- Linginno - Language Centre
- Tritonia - Academic Library, Vaasa
- Technobotnia - Research Centre
- Vaasan Yliopiston Ylioppilaskunta - Student Union of Vaasa University
- University of Vaasa Executive Education

== Rectors ==
- Tryggve Saxén 1968–1970
- Mauri Palomäki 1970–1987
- Ilkka Virtanen 1987–1994
- Ari Salminen 1994–1998
- Matti Jakobsson 1998–2014
- Suvi Ronkainen 2015–17
- Jari Kuusisto 2015–2017 (Acting rector)
- Jari Kuusisto 2017–2022
- Minna Martikainen 2023–

== Honorary doctorates ==
1988

- Heribert Picht
- Jaakko Numminen
- George Foster
- Bengt Holmström
- Jaakko Lassila
- Mauri Palomäki
- Martti Ulkuniemi

1998

- Brainard Guy Peters
- Vappu Taipale
- Joaquim Arnau
- Hartwig Kalverkämper
- Jean-François Hennart
- Matti Ilmari
- Baruch Lev
- Matti Sundberg

2006

- Esko Aho
- Christopher Pollitt
- Juhani Turunen
- Pirkko Nuolijärvi
- Sauli Takala
- John Vikström
- Chris Brewster
- Eero Lehti
- Robert W. Scapens
- Pentti Malaska
- Dušan Malindžák
- Heikki Miilumäki

2011

- György Jenei
- Merrill Swain
- Paula Risikko
- Eva Liljeblom
- Klaus G.Grunert
- Jorma Ollila
- Jouko Havunen
- Paul Geladi
- Pertti Järvinen
- Mikko Niinivaara

2018

- Jan Engberg
- Leena Niemistö
- Pervez Ghauri
- Eric von Hippel
- Annamaria Lusardi
- Timo Ritakallio
- Clare Lavelle
- Vesa Laisi
- Sirinnapa (Mui) Saranwong

2024

- Tim Baines
- Piotr Bielaczyc
- Sari Essayah
- Angappa Gunasekaran
- Iftekhar Hasan
- Katju Holkeri
- Anne Korkiakoski
- Björn Rosengren
- Alexander Stubb
- Roberto Verganti
- Jacob Wallenberg
- Johnny Åkerholm

== See also ==
- History of Finland
- List of universities in Finland
