= Ressu Upper Secondary School =

- Ressun lukio

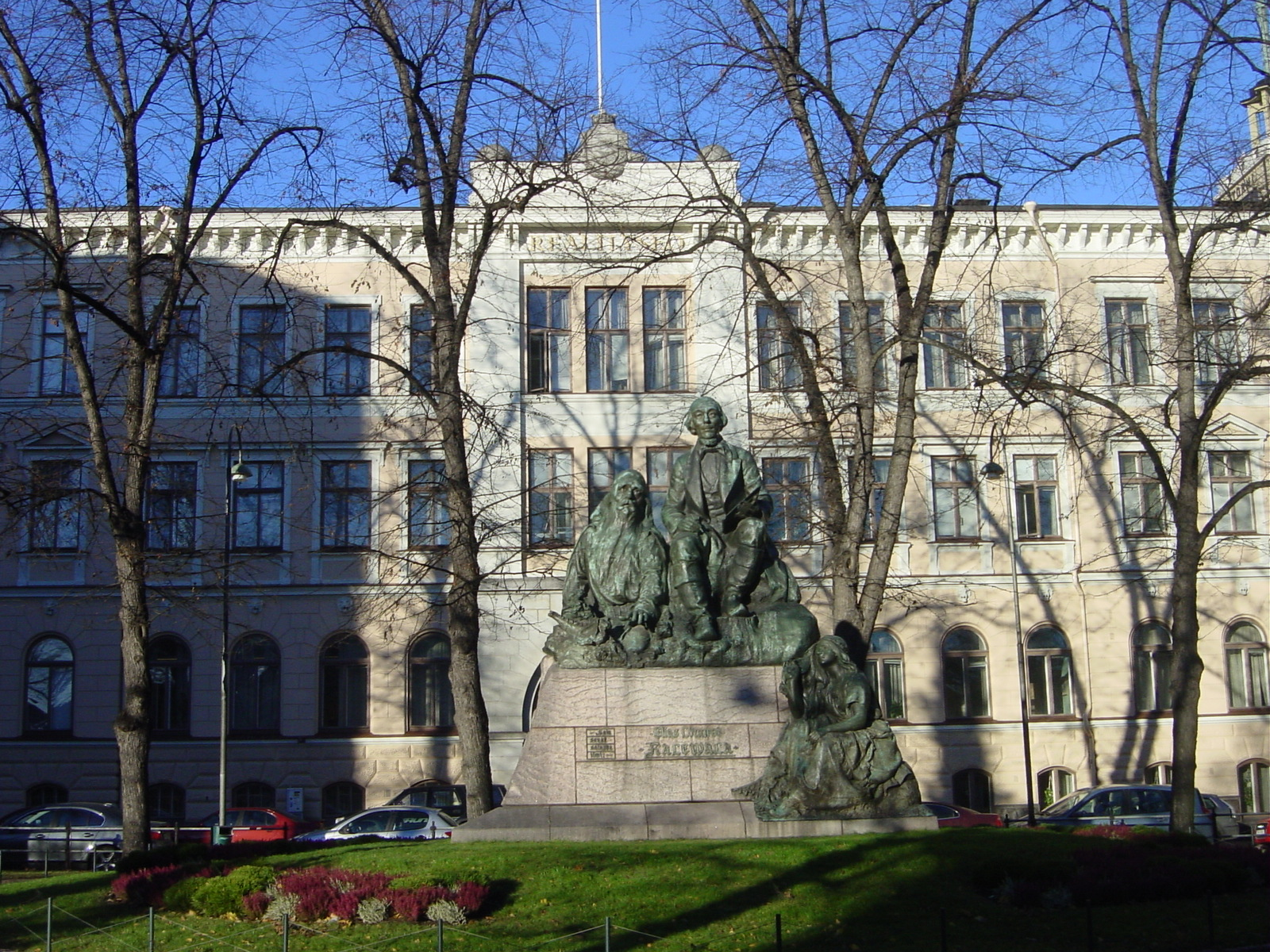
- The façade of Ressu from Lönnrotinkatu

Location
- Kalevankatu 8-10; Helsinki, Uusimaa; Finland
- Coordinates: 60°10′01″N 24°56′18″E

Information
- Type: Gymnasium; Upper Secondary School
- Motto: Finnish: "Tee työsi ilolla, velvollisuutesi kunnialla." English translation: “Do your work joyfully, your duties honorably.”
- Established: 1891
- Principal: Ari Huovinen
- Grades: 10-12
- Enrollment: 680
- Colors: Green, Gold
- Newspaper: Pärskeitä
- Website: www.hel.fi/hki/ressul/fi/Etusivu

Ressu Upper Secondary School (Finnish: Ressun lukio), also known internationally as Ressun lukio IB World School, is a secondary school (or gymnasium) located in central Helsinki, Finland. Founded in 1891, Ressu is one of the oldest Finnish speaking schools and considered to be one of the most prestigious schools in Finland.

Ressu is one of the most difficult upper secondary schools to gain entry to in Finland, with admission typically requiring grade point averages above 9.75 on the Finnish scale of 4.0 (the lowest) to 10.0 (the highest). Students in Ressu have a reputation of moving onto illustrious careers in further education, in a range of top universities both in Finland and abroad. The current principal is Ari Huovinen.

== History ==
The school was founded in 1891, at which time it was called Helsingin Suomalainen Realilyseo (the Helsinki Finnish Real Lyceum) and at which point it only taught male students. The teaching concentrated on broadening the previously strict and narrow subject areas, that were held mostly in Latin, to also include other languages as well as a selection of sciences. Gradually, the school's name changed. In 1914, it became "Helsingin Suomalainen Lyseo", and, in 1950, due to pressure from the school's Swedish-speaking minority, it was changed to simply "Helsingin Lyseo". When governorship of the school transferred from the Republic of Finland to the city of Helsinki in 1977, the school was told to choose a name based on its geographic location. However, due to large-scale student campaigning, the school was officially named after its long-standing nickname: Ressun lukio.

== Campus ==
The campus of Ressu Upper Secondary School consists of a single building in central Helsinki. It is situated on Lönnrotinkatu, across the road from the Old Church of Helsinki. The building is divided into four floors, with the lowest floor lacking dedicated classrooms and instead hosting other facilities for students, such as the school's cafeteria "Papa Huovinen's" (facetiously named after the school's principal), the school's library, two computer rooms, and the offices of the school's doctors.

== Curriculum ==
Ressun lukio offers the Finnish upper comprehensive programme held in Finnish, as well as the English IB Diploma Programme since 2002. Their first IB graduates graduated in 2005. About 120 of the 700 students are in the IB section, and the rest are taught in Finnish. The International Baccalaureate students tend to continue their education in Higher Education abroad, typically the United Kingdom and the United States.

Entry requirements 2000–2021
| Year | GPA (National curriculum) | Points total (IB DP) | Available placings |
|---|---|---|---|
| 2000–2001 | 9.09 | | |
| 2001–2002 | ▲9.18 | | |
| 2002–2003 | ▼9.09 | 15.23 | |
| 2003–2004 | ▲9.18 | ▲16.09 | |
| 2004–2005 | ▼9.11 | ▲16.24 | |
| 2005–2006 | ▲9.18 | ▼15.06 | |
| 2006–2007 | ▲9.21 | ▲15.26 | |
| 2007–2008 | ▲9.31 | ▼14.86 | |
| 2008–2009 | ▼9.23 | ▼14.85 | |
| 2009–2010 | ▲9.38 | ▼14.75 | |
| 2010–2011 | ▼9.33 | ▲15.09 | |
| 2011–2012 | ▼9.29 | ▲15.85 | |
| 2012–2013 | ▲9.42 | ▼13.48 | 210 |
| 2013–2014 | ▼9.17 | ▲15.34 | 210 |
| 2014–2015 | ▲9.50 | ▲15.40 | ▲215 |
| 2015–2016 | 9.50 | ▼15.34 | 210 |
| 2016–2017 | ▼9.33 | ▼15.32 | |
| 2017–2018 | ▲9.42 | ▼15.22 | |
| 2018–2019 | ▼9.31 | ▼15.10 | |
| 2019-2020 | ▲9.38 | ▼13.28 | |
| 2020-2021 | ▲9.69 | n/a | |

Students of the International Baccalaureate in Ressu have the option to study the following subjects:

- Group 1 (Language A): English A Language and Literature, Finnish A Literature (or a self-taught language A literature)
- Group 2 (Language B): Finnish, French (or another language A from group 1)
- Group 3 (Human Sciences): Economics, Environmental systems and societies, History, Psychology
- Group 4 (Experimental Sciences): Environmental systems and societies, Biology, Chemistry, Physics
- Group 5 (Mathematics): Mathematics analysis and approaches, Mathematics applications and interpretations
- Group 6 (Electives): Another subject from groups 2, 3, or 4

== Extracurricular activities ==
The Ressu Chess Club is one of the top-performing chess clubs in the Helsinki regional area. In their second year the students also have the possibility of partaking in Vanhojen tanssit (resembles the U.S. equivalent of prom), and perform traditional ballroom dances in the White Hall (Valkoinen Sali) in the center of Helsinki, next to the Presidential Palace. Other extracurricular activities include the school choir, debate club, and the school newspapers.

== Traditions and student life ==
Among students, Ressu has a constant, good-natured rivalry with two other schools in Helsinki: the Normal Lyceum of Helsinki (Norssi) and, to a lesser extent, Helsingin Suomalainen Yhteiskoulu (SYK). An annual sporting day pits students of Ressu and Norssi against each other in physical competition.

Students of Ressu often use the Peanuts character Snoopy as an unofficial symbol for the school and its students, as the Finnish name for Snoopy is "Ressu". Despite this usage, the school is not affiliated with Peanuts or its creator.

Ressu legend holds that upon graduation, the graduating class of students compose a Bingo game, made up of the catch-phrases that the Principal is expected to say upon his congratulatory speech and printed onto sheets of paper which are distributed to the audience. Any student who attains a Bingo must stand up and shout out 'Bingo' in front of the graduating class. Two students are said to have attained Bingos, one of them was rebuked, but went onto an eminent career in education and ultimately became Principal of the rivaling school SYK, bringing its scores higher than those attained at Ressu in 1994.

== Notable alumni ==
- Väinö Tanner (1881 – 1966), Prime Minister of Finland 1926 – 1927
- Ele Alenius (born 1925), chairman of the Finnish People's Democratic League 1967 – 1979
- Jan Klenberg (1931 – 2020), former Chief of Defence
- Hannu Karpo (born 1942), reporter
- Jukka Kuoppamäki (born 1942), singer
- Jaakko Kalela (born 1944), former member of the Presidential Cabinet, current Finnish ambassador to Ethiopia
- Risto Alapuro (born 1944), sociologist
- Pentti Arajärvi (born 1948), politician and husband of Tarja Halonen
- Hannu Raittila (born 1956), writer and winner of 2001 Finlandia Prize
- Michael Monroe (born 1962), musician and vocalist of Hanoi Rocks
- Sami Garam (born 1967), chef and writer
- Tommi Korpela born (1968), actor
- Katariina Souri (born 1968), author
- Riku Rantala (born 1974) and Tuomas Milonoff (born 1974), journalists and creators of Madventures
- Laura Räty (born 1977), politician
- Stig (Pasi Siitonen) (born 1978), singer
