= West Finland College =

Folk high school in Huittinen, Finland

Coordinates: 61°09′14″N 022°40′44″E

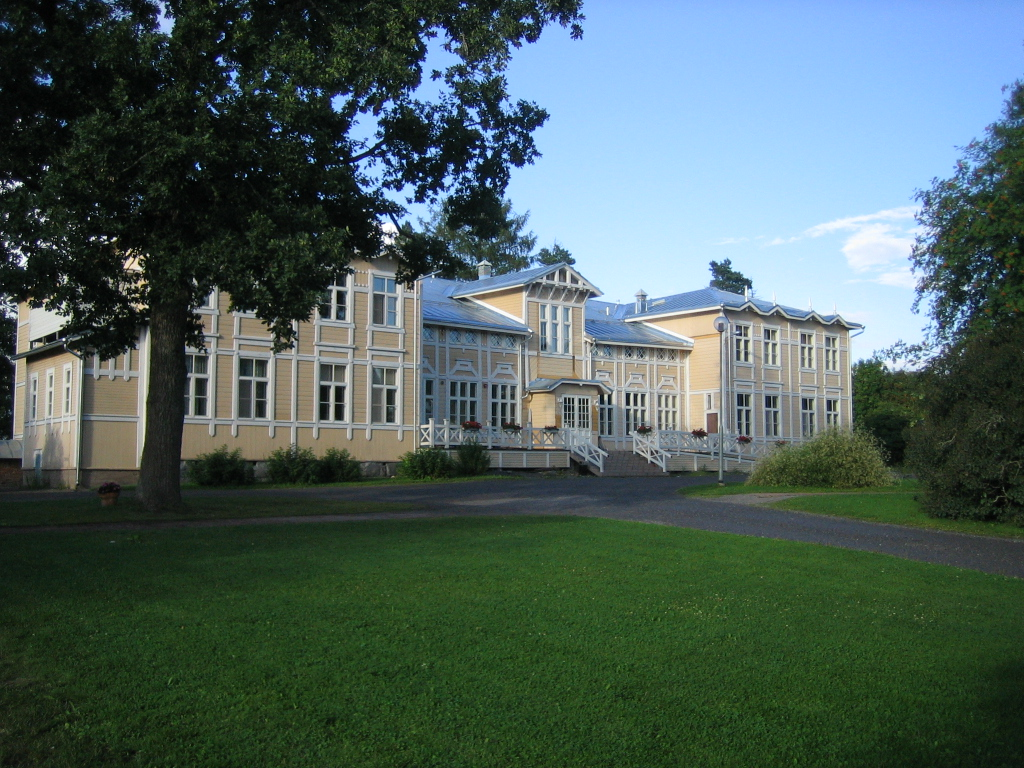
West Finland College: main building

West Finland College (Finnish: Länsi-Suomen opisto) is the oldest Finnish-speaking Folk High School operating in the village of Loima, Huittinen. This religiously and politically independent educational institution was founded in 1892.

The mission of West Finland College is to guide and support students in achieving personal, cultural and educational goals in accordance with lifelong learning principles. Along with that, the school promotes the sense of community and internationality of education.

The historical and cultural venues of the College like the Assembly hall are where numerous meetings, seminars and celebrations are held. The Chimney Hall is located on the river bank and is a very popular place for arranging events. In autumn 2010 a new stage with seats were added to the Chimney hall. Dormitories are either new or fully renovated. Over 90% of College's students live in the dormitories.

== Informal adult education ==
The college is a well known and one of the biggest educational institutions focused on informal adult education in Finland. Every year over a thousand students from different countries study a variety of courses presented by the college. The courses cover foreign languages, theatre and arts studies as well as preparatory courses for entrance exams for medicine, law, economics etc.

Along with these, the college provides education for immigrants, especially marginalized risk groups and those who need educational rehabilitation. The college participates in different national and international projects, focused on strengthening the internationality of education and developing informal adult educational studies.

== Courses ==
=== Languages ===
The College offers Finnish and English language studies. The English course lasts for 9 months and includes a period of study abroad. The 2-month-long Finnish courses are arranged in Autumn and Spring time. Summer time is mostly filled with 2-week-long English-language camps.

=== Theatre and Arts ===
The college presents a Dance course and a unique English Drama Course. The course leaders are professional actors and award-winning dance teachers. These courses last 9 months.

=== Performing Arts Academy ===
West Finland College Performing Arts Academy offers an opportunity to develop oneself in the field of theatre, dance, music and general performing. The main goal of the course is to offer the participants plenty of opportunities for performing. Along with that, the students study English language in a creative and fun way with professional instructors. The working language of the course is English.

=== Preparation courses ===
The college mainly arranges preparation courses in Medicine for those who want to have University entrance.

== History ==
West Finland College was founded in 1892 to serve the educational needs of the countryside population and support ideology of "Finnishness". In the beginning the education was practical oriented: skills needed in traditional agrarian society were taught, like agriculture and housekeeping. During the war period the college worked as an artillery school and later as a military hospital. The international connections of the college began from the late 1950s when the first student exchanges with Great Britain, Western Germany and the Netherlands took place. The college was the first Finnish folk high school, which started student exchange activities. Starting from the 1960s the range of courses offered by the college was enlarged and students started coming from other regions than Satakunta.

=== Principles / directors of the College ===
Name	Period
Maunu Kustaa Aadolf Knaapinen	1892–1904
Frans Akseli Hästesko (Heporauta vsta −35)	1904–1906
Eino Mela	1906–1907
Gustaf Selim Ignatius	1907–1910
Jaakko Sakari Vilho Loimaranta	1910–1919
Martti Viktor Vaula	1919–1920
Johan Eberhard Tuompo	1920–1928
Aarre Aatos Tuompo	1930–1955
Sirkka Hellikki Salomaa	1956–1983
Pekka Laaksonen	1983–1991
Ringa Setälä	1991–1992
Risto Numminen	1992–2005
Sami Malinen	2005 –
