= University consortium =

Educational institution in Finland

A university consortium (Finnish: yliopistokeskus) in Finland is an educational institution managed by the Ministry of Education, coordinating university-level higher education in localities where there are no universities. There are six such consortiums set up since 2004, in Kajaani, Kokkola, Lahti, Mikkeli, Pori, and Seinäjoki. These consortiums typically work with one or more universities to provide education at their host localities.

== List of university consortiums ==
- Kajaanin yliopistokeskus
- Kokkolan yliopistokeskus
- Lahden yliopistokeskus
- Mikkelin yliopistokeskus
- University Consortium of Pori
- Seinäjoen yliopistokeskus
