= Normal Lyceum of Helsinki =

School in Helsinki, Finland

Coordinates: 60°9′45.5″N 24°56′36.5″E

Normal Lyceum of Helsinki Finnish: Helsingin normaalilyseo
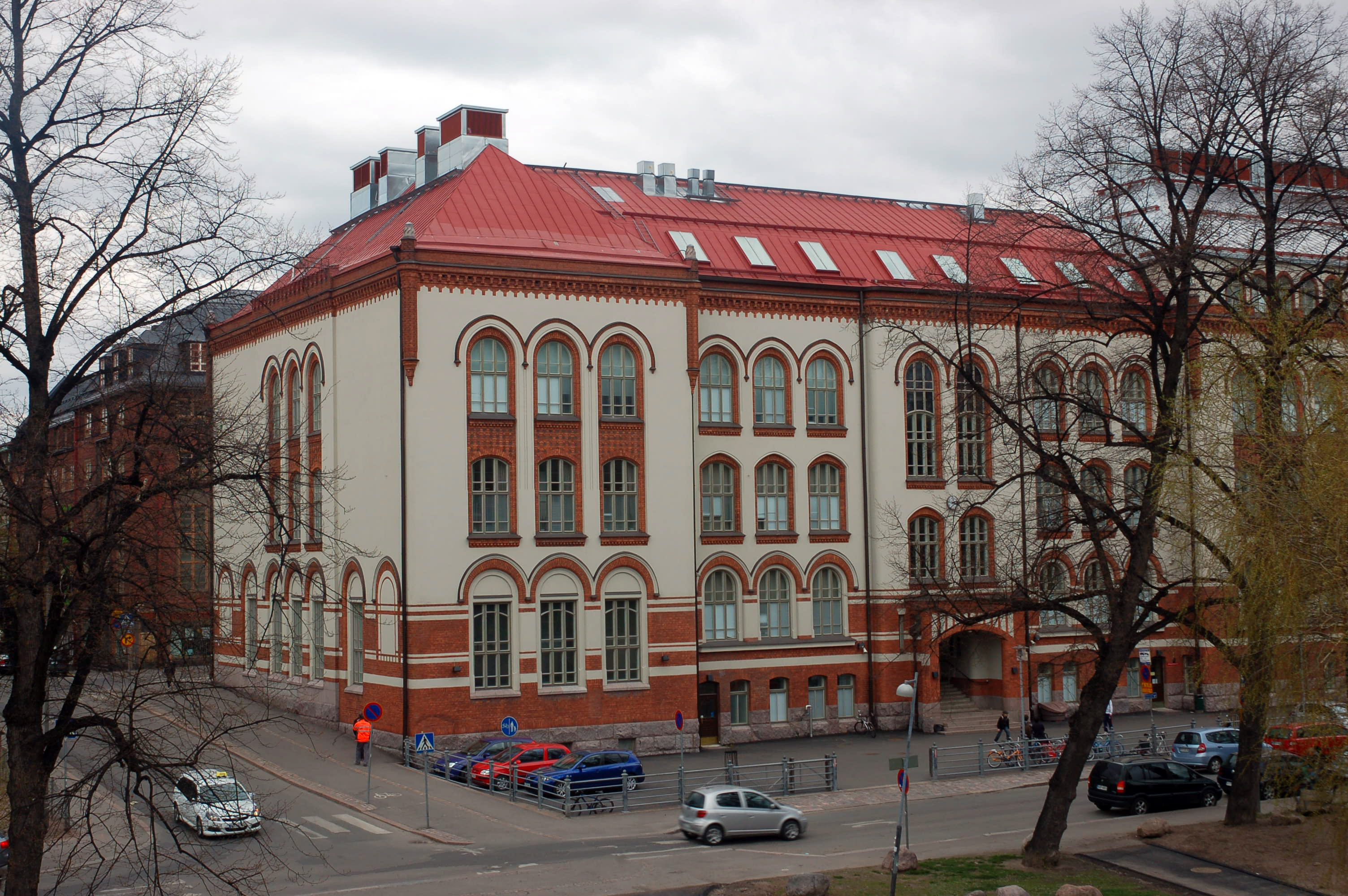
- Helsinki; Finland

Information
- Established: 1867; 158 years ago
- Affiliation: University of Helsinki
- Alumni name: Finnish: vanha Norssi (English: Old Norssi)

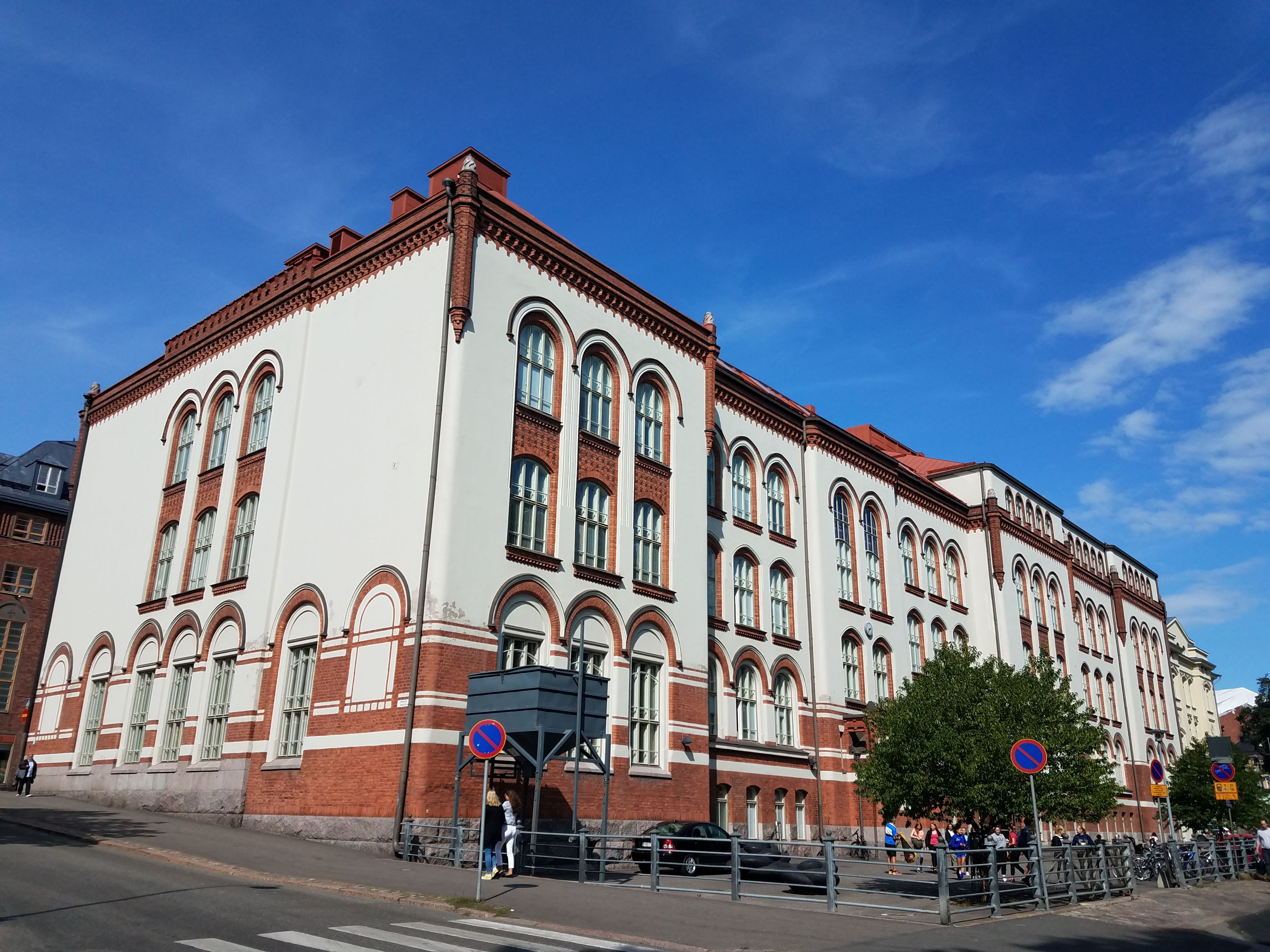
The Normal Lyceum of Helsinki

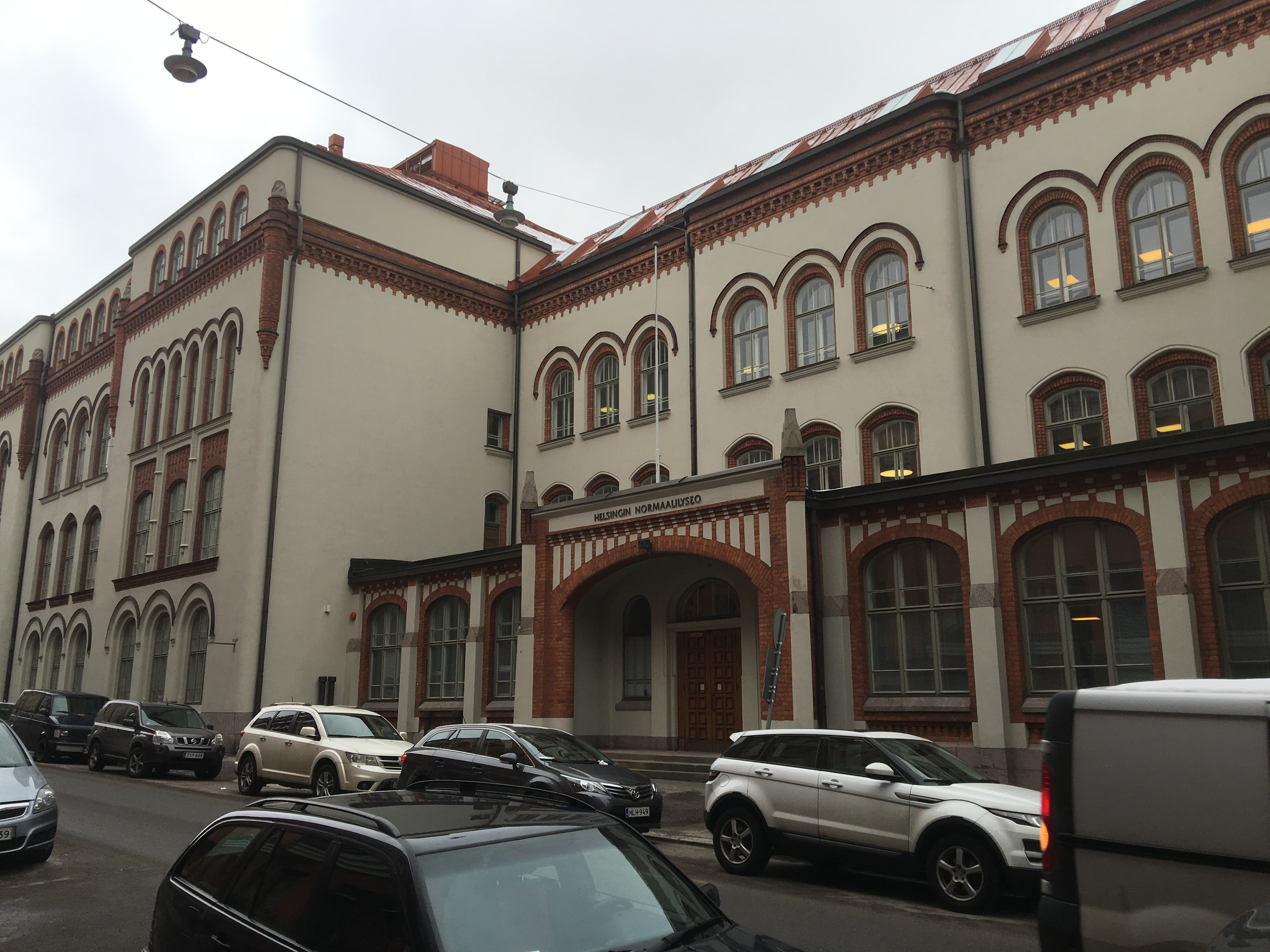
The entrance from Ratakatu

Normal Lyceum of Helsinki (In Finnish; Helsingin normaalilyseo) is a school in Helsinki, Finland, consisting of the upper part of primary school (peruskoulun yläaste, grades 7 to 9) and secondary school (lukio). It is one of the oldest still active Finnish-language schools in Finland. The school is located at Ratakatu 6 in Punavuori.

Unlike most other schools in Helsinki, the school is not owned by the city of Helsinki, but is instead part of the University of Helsinki, which itself is owned directly by the state of Finland. The school is a separate unit of the Faculty of behavioural sciences at the University of Helsinki. The school is considered one of the most prestigious. It is the hardest to get into, in the entire country, tied with Ressun Lukio. In 2023 the school had a total of about 740 students, of which about 480 were at primary school and about 260 at secondary school. In 2025 the minimum required grade average to get to the secondary school was 9.69 out of 10. Since 2015, Doctor of behavioural sciences Tapio Lahtero has served as the principal of the school.

The established nickname for the school is Norssi, which also means a student of the school. Former students who have graduated from the school are called vanha Norssi (Finnish for "old Norssi"). The school has a constant, good-natured rivalry with Ressun lukio (Ressu Upper Secondary School, previously known as "Helsingin reaalilyseo") and Helsingin Suomalainen Yhteiskoulu which are considered even more prestigious than the Normal Lyceum by some.

The long history of the school as a classical school is still evident from the fact that it is one of the few schools in Finland offering tuition in Latin from grade 7 at primary school onwards. The motto of the school is the Latin phrase "Non scholae sed vitae discimus" ("We are not studying for the sake of the school, but for the sake of life").

== History ==
The Helsinki normal lyceum was initially conceived in the autumn of 1867, when Finnish-speaking classes were added to the Swedish normal lyceum of Helsinki. Because of linguistic political reasons, the Finnish classes were ordered to be discontinued in 1871, but the Finnish schooling continued directly in a privately owned Helsinki Finnish Primary School. In the autumn of 1878, the Primary School moved to a newly built school building at Ratakatu 2 in Punavuori, Helsinki. The new school building was designed by the architect Frans Anatolius Sjöström.

In 1887, the Primary School became state-owned and was named the Helsinki Finnish Normal Lyceum. At the same time, the Hämeenlinna Normal-Lycée founded in 1873 was changed to a regular lyceum.

The school operated at Ratakatu 2 from 1887 to 1905 until it moved to a new building at Ratakatu 4 (nowadays Ratakatu 6) designed by the architect Jacob Ahrenberg. The building was inaugurated on 28 October 1905.

The school went through several name changes until finally becoming the Helsinki Normal Lyceum on January 1, 1995.

After repairs in the building had been completed in spring 2006, the premises on Ratakatu 6a returned to the use of the Normal Lyceum of Helsinki for the first time in a hundred years, when the training of new teachers moved to the City Centre Campus in Kruununhaka. At the same time repairs were made to the building at Ratakatu 6b, which are now already complete. During the repairs, the old intermediary part connecting the two buildings was dismantled and replaced with a new intermediary part designed by Cedercreutz Architects. The new intermediary part hosts the gymnastics hall, the computer class and a two-floor lobby. The lobby is the only common part of the building to face south towards the St. John's Church. The large window, spiral staircase and railing on the landing form an architectonically interesting space.

The long history of the Normal Lyceum of Helsinki has given birth to many aspects of Finnish school tradition. For example the senior prom dance held by the second-year students at the secondary school, called "vanhojen tanssi" in Finnish, is believed to originate from the Normal Lyceum of Helsinki.

== Notable alumni ==
- Matti Klinge, professor of history
- J.K. Paasikivi, politician and diplomat
- Lasse Pöysti, actor and playwright
- Pentti Saarikoski, poet
- Erkki Salmenhaara, professor or musicology and composer
- Toivo J. Särkkä, film director and producer
- Mika Waltari, author
