= Ukrainian Artistic Front =

Ukraine

- Ukrainian Artistic Front
- Український мистецький фронт
- Formation: March 2022
- Headquarters: Ukraine

Ukrainian Art Front (UAF) (Ukrainian: Український мистецький фронт, romanized: Ukrainskyi mystetskyi front) was launched in March 2022 in Lviv to raise funds for the Armed Forces of Ukraine. The project was created and implemented by Serhiy Fedorchuk, Ukrainian musician and organizer of musical events, and Olga Chertkova, owner of the Kyiv-based communication agency Top Media Communication.

The collected funds are transferred to the account of the NGO International Association of Artists, then the International Charitable Foundation "Patriot" uses them for the needs of a separate special purpose regiment of the NGU "Azov".

== #dechansonization ==
#Dechansonization — the first project of the Ukrainian Art Front, is a series of street, club and online concerts of Ukrainian musicians in Lviv. As of April 11, 2022, 18 performances of Ukrainian musicians were held in the styles of classical and electronic music, jazz, rock and blues.

== Individual Concerts ==
On March 18, 2022, a 40-minute jazz concert took place among a crowd of refugees at Lviv's main railway station. The concert was attended by musicians: trumpet - Denis Adu (Kryvyi Rih), piano — Kostiantyn Kravchuk (Vinnytsia), saxophone — David Kolpakov (Odesa), trombone — Andriy Arnautov (Lviv), bass — Serhiy Fedorchuk (Lviv), drums — Markiyan Krysa (Kyiv).

On March 27, 2022, musician Sasha Chemerov, founder of the Californian rock band The Gitas and the Ukrainian rock band Dymna Mix, performed at Rynok Square. This concert was also attended by: frontman of O.Torvald band from Poltava, Zhenya Galich, who this time played bass; guitarist from Kyiv, Mykola Tskhovrebashvili, guitarist from Lviv, Taras Kushniruk, and Lviv, percussionist, Dania Bilous.

On April 7, 2022, Krut, a project by musician Marina Krut, was broadcast online from the Lviv bomb shelter and April 8 from the LV Café Jazz Club within the framework of the UMF from Khmelnitsky. Marina first played songs from an unreleased album. Musicians from different cities of the country took the stage with her: Andriy Yuzkevych - percussion (Ternopil), Mykola Honcharenko - guitar (Kharkiv), Denis Adu — trumpet, weather vane horn (Kryvyi Rih), Serhiy Fedorchuk — double bass (Lviv).

10 April 2022 In Lviv, the LV CAFE jazz club hosted a charity acoustic concert "I am from Ukraine" by MARY frontman Victor Vynnyk in support of the Ukrainian army. Together with Viktor Vynnyk performed: Yakiv Tsvetinskyi - trumpet (Dnipro), Taras Kushniruk - guitar (Lviv), Markiyan Krysa - drums (Kyiv), Serhiy Fedorchuk - double bass (Lviv).
