= Risto =

Male given name

Risto is a masculine given name, found in Finnish, Estonian and South Slavic. In South Slavic, it is a hypocorism derived from Hristofor or Hristivoje.

== Usage ==
It may refer to:

== Estonia ==
- Risto Järv (born 1971), folklorist
- Risto Joost (born 1980), conductor and operatic countertenor
- Risto Kallaste (born 1971), footballer
- Risto Kappet (born 1994), sim racing driver
- Risto Kask (born 1985), civil servant and politician
- Risto Kübar (born 1983), actor
- Risto Lillemets (born 1997), decathlete
- Risto Lumi (born 1971), military colonel
- Risto Mätas (born 1984), javelin thrower

== Finland ==
- Risto Aaltonen (1939–2021), actor
- Risto Ahti (born 1943), writer and recipient of the Eino Leino Prize in 1994
- Risto Alapuro (1944–2022), sociologist
- Risto Ankio (born 1937), athlete
- Risto Asikainen (born 1958), record producer, songwriter and musician
- Risto Björlin (born 1944), wrestler
- Risto Dufva (born 1963), former professional ice hockey goaltender
- Risto Hurme (born 1950), modern pentathlete and fencer (1966)
- Risto Ihamuotila (born 1938), retired academic and ex-Chancellor of the University of Helsinki
- Risto Isomäki (born 1961), environmental activist and author of science fiction and nonfiction books
- Risto Jalo (born 1962), retired professional ice hockey player
- Risto Jarva (1934–1977), filmmaker
- Risto Jussilainen (born 1975), ski jumper
- Risto Kala (1941–2021), basketball player
- Risto Kalliorinne (born 1971), politician in the Parliament of Finland
- Risto Kaskilahti (born 1963), actor
- Risto Kiiskinen (born 1956), cross-country skier
- Risto Korhonen (born 1986), former professional ice hockey defenceman
- Risto Kuntsi (1912–1964), shot putter who won a silver medal at the 1934 European Championships
- Risto Laakkonen (born 1967), ski jumper who competed from 1986 to 1993
- Risto Lamppu (1924–1995), field hockey player
- Risto Lauriala (born 1949), classical pianist
- Risto Luukkonen (1931–1967), boxer
- Risto-Veikko Luukkonen (1902–1972), architect
- Risto Mannisenmäki (born 1959), former rally co-driver, twice world champion with driver Tommi Mäkinen
- Risto Mattila (born 1981), snowboarder
- Risto Mattila (athlete) (1909–1990), sprinter
- Risto Meronen (born 1945), boxer
- Risto Miikkulainen, Finnish-American computer scientist, professor at the University of Texas at Austin
- Risto Mustonen (1875–1941), wrestler
- Risto Näätänen (1939–2023), psychologist and neuroscientist, Professor in University of Helsinki 1975–1999
- Risto Nuuros, orienteering competitor, silver medalist at the 1978 World Orienteering Championships in Kongsberg
- Risto Orko (1899–2001), film producer and director
- Risto Penttilä (born 1959), former member of the Finnish parliament, Director of the Finnish Business and Policy Forum
- Risto Punkka (1957–2014), biathlete
- Risto Puustinen (born 1959), football manager and a former footballer
- Risto Rasa (born 1954), poet
- Risto Rosendahl (born 1979), speed skater
- Risto Ryti (1889–1956), fifth President of Finland from 1940 to 1944
- Risto Siilasmaa (born 1966), the chairman, founder and former CEO of F-Secure Corporation (anti-virus and computer security software)
- Risto Siltanen (born 1958), retired professional ice hockey defenceman
- Risto Solanko (1901–1980), diplomat
- Risto Soramies (born 1946), bishop of the Evangelical Lutheran Mission Diocese of Finland
- Risto Syrjänen (1925–2016), hurdler
- Risto Talosela (1924–2018), wrestler
- Risto Tuorila (born 1947), actor
- Risto Ulmala (born 1963), former long-distance runner

== Macedonia ==
- Risto Apostolov, songwriter, composer, and music producer
- Risto Bimbiloski (born 1975), fashion designer
- Risto Božinov, footballer
- Risto Duganov (born 1975), former professional basketball Small forward
- Risto Gjorgjiev, Director of Military Service for Security and Intelligence
- Risto Jankov (born 1998), footballer
- Risto Kirjazovski (1927–2002), historian, scientist and publisher
- Risto Krle (1900–1975), playwright
- Risto Milosavov (born 1965), footballer
- Risto Mitrevski (born 1991), professional footballer
- Risto Samardžiev (born 1964), singer and songwriter

== Montenegro ==
- Risto Lakić (born 1983), football defender
- Risto Radovićo (1938–2020), bishop of the Serbian Orthodox Church, theologian, university professor, author, translator
- Risto Radunović (born 1992), professional footballer
- Risto Ratković (1903–1954), avant-garde (Surrealist) writer and diplomat
- Risto Stijović (1894–1974), sculptor

== Serbia ==
- Risto Ristović, footballer
- Risto Stijović, sculptor
- Risto Vidaković, retired footballer

== Other nationalities ==
- Risto Darlev (born 1954), Yugoslav former wrestler
- Risto Mejide (born 1975), Spanish publicist, author, music producer and songwriter, judge on the television show Operación Triunfo
- Risto Savin, Slovenian composer
- Risto Siliqi (1882–1936), Albanian poet, publicist, lawyer, and militant of the Albanian national cause

== Fictional characters ==
- Risto Räppääjä or Ricky Rapper, main character in Finnish children's fantasy books and comic strips by Sinikka Nopola and Tiina Nopola

== Other uses ==
- Risto (film), 2011 Finnish film
- Risto (band), a Finnish pop rock band

== See also ==
- Ristović
