= Eino Leino Prize =

Finnish literary prize

The Eino Leino Prize is an annual prize awarded to top writers in Finland since 1956, with particular emphasis on poets.

It is named after Eino Leino, a pioneer of Finnish poetry.

== Recipients ==
- 1956 Viljo Kajava
- 1957 Helvi Juvonen
- 1958 Rabbe Enckell
- 1959 Aapeli (Simo Puupponen)
- 1960 Olavi Paavolainen
- 1961 Juha Mannerkorpi
- 1962 Pertti Nieminen
- 1963 Paavo Haavikko
- 1964 Arvo Salo
- 1965 Hagar Olsson
- 1966 Einari Vuorela
- 1967 Marja-Leena Mikkola
- 1968 Kerttu Kauniskangas
- 1969 Mirjam Polkunen
- 1970 Heikki Palmu
- 1971 Vilhelm Helander and Mikael Sundman
- 1972 Raoul Palmgren
- 1973 Arvo Turtiainen
- 1974 Kaisa Korhonen
- 1975 Henrik Tikkanen
- 1976 Eila Kivikk'aho
- 1977 Nils-Börje Stormbom
- 1978 Jukka Vieno
- 1979 Mirkka Rekola
- 1980 Elvi Sinervo
- 1981 Väinö Kirstinä
- 1982 Hannu Mäkelä
- 1983 Pentti Linkola
- 1984 Erno Paasilinna
- 1985 Hannu Salama
- 1986 Claes Andersson
- 1987 Helvi Hämäläinen
- 1988 Jyrki Pellinen
- 1989 Tuomas Anhava
- 1990 Olli Jalonen
- 1991 Ilpo Tiihonen
- 1992 Jaan Kaplinski
- 1993 Jyrki Kiiskinen and Jukka Koskelainen
- 1994 Risto Ahti
- 1995 Caj Westerberg
- 1996 Risto Rasa
- 1997 Thomas Warburton
- 1998 Raija Siekkinen
- 1999 Kai Nieminen
- 2000 Sirkka Turkka
- 2001 Markku Into
- 2002 Virpi Hämeen-Anttila and Jaakko Hämeen-Anttila
- 2003 Tuomari Nurmio
- 2004 Veijo Meri
- 2005 Antti Hyry
- 2006 Juha Hurme
- 2007 Eira Stenberg
- 2008 Eeva Luotonen
- 2009 Hannele Huovi
- 2010 J. K. Ihalainen
- 2011 Kari Aronpuro
- 2012 Martti Anhava
- 2013 Leif Salmén
- 2014 Kimmo Pietiläinen
- 2015 Leevi Lehto
- 2016 Liisa Enwald
- 2017 Leena Krohn
- 2018 Kirsi Kunnas
- 2019 Jaana Koistinen
- 2020 Johanna Venho
- 2021 Miia Toivio
- 2022 Kaiho Nieminen
- 2023 Niillas Holmberg
- 2024 Sirpa Kyyrönen
- 2025 Alice Martin
