= Herbert Lomas (poet) =

British poet, academic and translator

Herbert Lomas (7 February 1924 – 9 September 2011) was a British poet and translator. He served in the infantry from 1943 to 1946). He then graduated from University of Liverpool, and taught at the University of Helsinki and Borough Road College. Lomas was a "prolific translator" from Finnish. In Finland, Lomas was married to Anna-Liisa Partanen (née Aatila) from 28 July 1956 to 29 May 1968. They had no children together but Lomas was stepfather to Anna-Liisa's four children. Later, Lomas married Mary Marshall Phelps on 29 June 1968; they had one son and one daughter.

== Awards ==
- Guinness Poetry Competition
- 1982 Cholmondeley Award
- Knight, First Class, of the Order of the White Rose of Finland

== Works ==
=== Poetry ===
- Chimpanzees are blameless creatures, Mandarin Books, 1969
- Who needs Money?, Blond and Briggs, 1972
- Private and confidential, London Magazine Editions, 1974
- Public Footpath, Anvil Press, 1981
- Fire in the garden Oxford University Press, 1984
- Letters in the Dark Oxford University Press, 1986
- Trouble Sinclair-Stevenson, 1992
- Selected Poems Sinclair-Stevenson, 1995, ISBN 978-1-85619-613-0
- A Useless Passion London Magazine Editions, 1999
- The Vale of Todmorden Arc Publications, 2003, ISBN 978-1-900072-81-6
- A Casual Knack of Living – Collected Poems Arc Publications, 2009, ISBN 978-1-906570-41-5

=== Translations ===
- Territorial Song, London Magazine Editions, 1981
- Contemporary Finnish Poetry, Bloodaxe Books, 1991, ISBN 978-1-85224-147-6
- Fugue by Kai Nieminen. Musta Taide, Helsinki, 1992
- Wings of Hope and Daring, 1992
- Wings of the Fingertips are Opening by Leena Krohn. Musta Taide, Helsinki, 1993
- The Black and the Red by Ilpo Tiihonen. Making Waves, 1993
- Narcissus in Winter by Risto Ahti, Making Waves, 1994
- The Year of the Hare by Arto Paasilinna. Peter Owen, 1995
- Two Sequences for Kuhmo by Lauri Otonkoski & Kuhmon Kamarimusikin. Kannatusyhdistys RY, 1994
- Eeva-Liisa Manner: Selected Poems, Making Waves, 1997
- Three Finnish Poets, London Magazine Editions, 1999
- A Tenant Here: Selected Poems of Pentti Holappa. Dedalus Press, 1999
- Gaia, a Musical for Children by Ilpo Tiihonen. Suomen Kansallisteatteri, 2000
- Troll: a love story by Johanna Sinisalo. Grove Press, 2004, ISBN 978-0-8021-4129-3
