= Juvonen =

Juvonen is a Finnish surname. Notable people with the surname include:

- Helmi Juvonen (1903–1985), American artist
- Helvi Juvonen (1919–1959), Finnish writer
- Nancy Juvonen (born 1967), American film producer
- Arja Juvonen (born 1967), Finnish politician
- Janne Juvonen (born 1994), Finnish ice hockey goaltender
