= Hyry =

Hyry is a Finnish surname. Notable people with the surname include:

- Antti Hyry (1931–2016), Finnish writer
- Arttu Hyry (born 2001), Finnish ice hockey player
