= Arvo Turtiainen =

Finnish writer

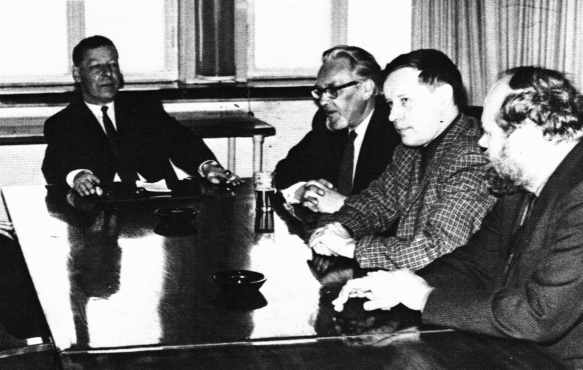
- Arvo Turtiainen, second from left
- Born: Arvo Albin Turtiainen; 16 September 1904; Helsinki, Grand Duchy of Finland, Russian Empire
- Died: 8 October 1980 (aged 76); Helsinki, Finland
- Occupations: Poet; translator

Arvo Albin Turtiainen (16 September 1904 – 8 October 1980) was a Finnish writer and translator.

== Biography ==
Turtiainen was born in 1904 to mother Ida Lovisa Väätäinen and father Ernst Turtiainen, a tailor. His father, as a young man, sang in a choir, participated in drama clubs and wrote poems. From his father Arvo inherited an artistic tendency along with a left-wing worldview.

Turtiainen attended five years at Ressu Upper Secondary School and graduated as a dental technician. From 1932−1933 he studied at the University of Tampere and worked as a journalist afterwards, until he became a freelance writer in 1934.

His first wife was Aino Helena Vormula and his second Brita Polttila, who married Turtiainen in 1953.

In the Winter War Turtiainen served as a company commander, but for conscientious reasons he refused to participate in the Continuation War and went into hiding in 1941. He was arrested in early March 1942 along with the writer Raoul Palmgren and his wife Irja. Turtiainen was convicted on four counts of desertion and attempted high treason, sent to a labour penitentiary for six months and stripped of his rank. He was released in 1944.

Turtiainen was a member of Kiila, an association for writers and artists, and the Communist Party of Finland. He also worked for the socialist magazine 40-luku (The 40's) from 1945 to 1947.

He received the Eino Leino Prize in 1973.

== Literary career ==
Turtiainen was a board member with the literary group Tulenkantajat from 1937 to 1939 and started writing for the group's magazine Tulenkantajat. His debut work Muutos (Change) was published in 1936 and his only novel Rautakourat (Iron Fists) was published in 1938.

Based on his prison experience, he wrote the works Ihminen n:o 503/42 (Person No. 503/42) and Laulu kiven ja raudan ympyrässä (A song in a circle of stone and iron).

He expressed his disappointment with the events of the 1968 Prague Spring with the publication of his work Puheita Porthaninrinteellä (Speeches from Porthaninrinne).

Turtiainen was an active citizen of Helsinki and he received the nickname "Stadin Arska", particularly for his depictions of Helsinki's working class. He also used "stadi" (Helsinki) slang in several poems.

As a translator, Turtianen translated into Finnish the works of Edgar Lee Masters, Graham Greene, Vladimir Mayakovsky and Walt Whitman, among others.

== Works ==
- Muutos (1936)
- Rautakourat (1938)
- Tie pilven alta (1939)
- Palasin kotiin (1944)
- Laulu kiven ja raudan ympyrässä (1945)
- Ihminen n:o 503/42 (1946)
- Laulu puolueelle (1946)
- Tapahtui satamassa (1954)
- Laulu ajasta ja rakkaudesta (1954)
- Minä rakastan (1955)
- Syyskevät (1959)
- Minä paljasjalkainen (1962)
- Runoja 1943–64 (1964)
- Hyvää joulua (1967)
- Puheita Porthaninrinteellä (1968)
- Leivän kotimaa (1974)
- Runoja 1934–68 (1974)
- Minun maailmani: Kirjoituksia 1932–1975 (1978)
