= Polkunen =

Polkunen is a Finnish surname. Notable people with the surname include:

- Mirjam Polkunen (1926–2012), Finnish writer, translator and dramatist
- Sirkka Polkunen (1927–2014), Finnish cross-country skier
