= List of compositions by Kalevi Aho =

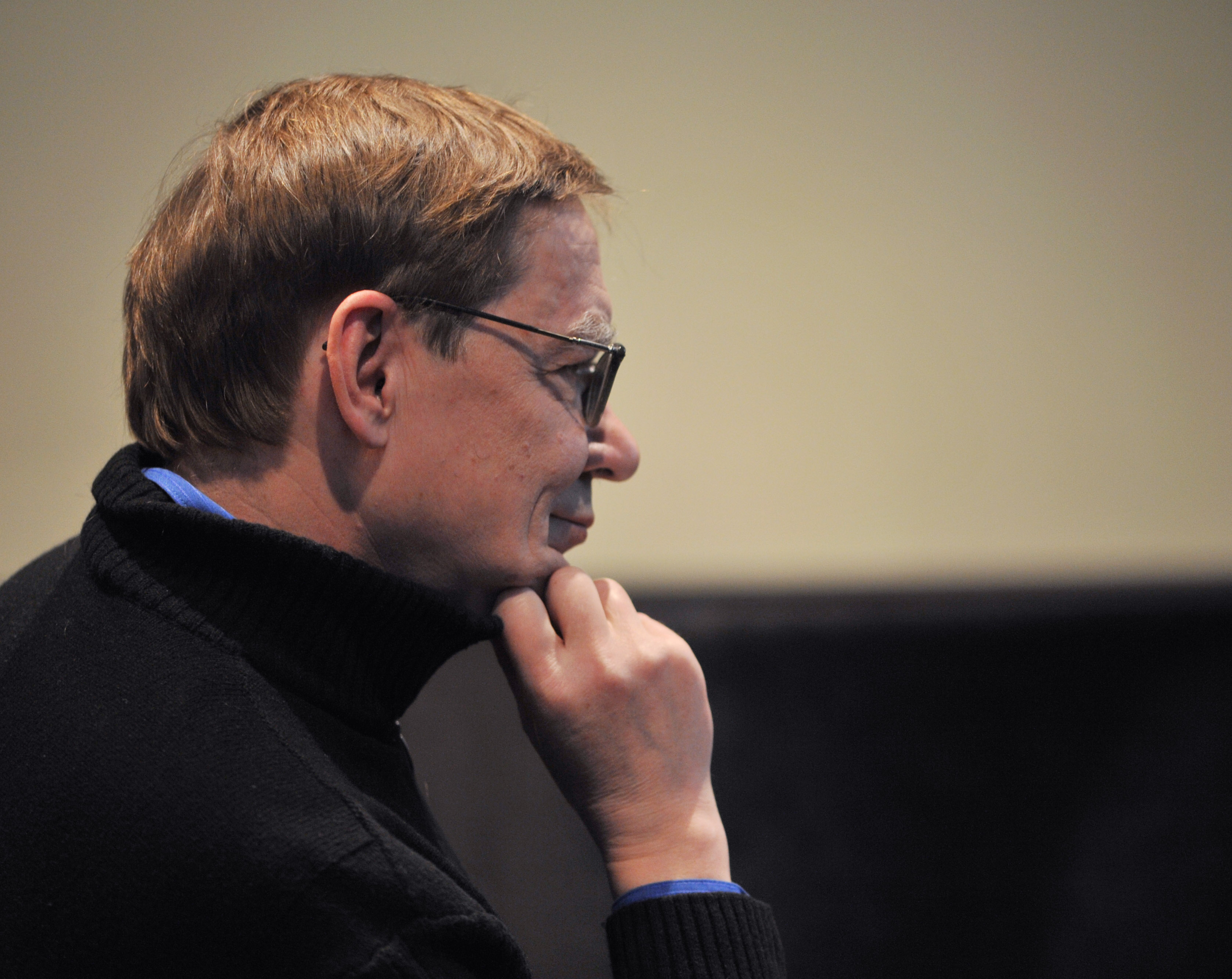
Kalevi Aho in 2010

This is a list of compositions by Kalevi Aho.

== Operas ==
- The Key (1978–79), libretto by Kalevi Aho and Juha Mannerkorpi based on the latter's monologue Avain
- Insect Life (original Finnish title: Hyönteiselämää) (1985–87), opera in 2 acts, libretto by the composer based on the play Ze života hmyzu by Josef Čapek and Karel Čapek
- Before We Are All Drowned (Finnish: Ennen kuin me kaikki olemme hukkuneet (1995/1999), libretto by Kalevi Aho based on radio play of the same title by Juha Mannerkorpi
- The Book of Secrets (Finnish: Salaisuuksien kirja (1998), opera in one act. Libretto by Paavo Rintala and Kalevi Aho
- Frida y Diego (2012–13), opera in 4 acts, Spanish libretto by Maritza Núñez

== Symphonies ==
- Symphony No. 1 (1969)
- Symphony No. 2 (1970/1995)
- Symphony No. 3, for violin and orchestra (1971–73)
- Symphony No. 4 (1972–73)
- Symphony No. 5 (1975–76)
- Symphony No. 6 (1979–80)
- Symphony No. 7 Insect Symphony (1988)
- Symphony No. 8, for organ and orchestra (1993)
- Symphony No. 9, for trombone and orchestra (1993–94)
- Symphony No. 10 (1996)
- Symphony No. 11, for six percussionists and orchestra (1997–98)
- Symphony No. 12 Luosto, for two orchestras (2002–03)
- Symphony No. 13 Symphonic Characterizations (2003)
- Symphony No. 14 Rituals, for chamber orchestra, darabuka, djembe, gongs and tam-tams (2007)
- Symphony No. 15 (2009–10)
- Symphony No. 16, for mezzo soprano, large string orchestra and percussion (2013–14)
- Symphony No. 17 Sinfonisia freskoja (Symphonic Frescoes) (2017)
- Symphony No. 18 (2024)
- Chamber Symphony No. 1, for 20 strings (1976)
- Chamber Symphony No. 2, for 20 strings (1991–92)
- Chamber Symphony No. 3, for alto saxophone and 20 strings (1995–96)

== Orchestral ==
- Silence (1982)
- Fanfaari YS:lle / Fanfare for YS, for brass ensemble (1986)
- Paloheimo Fanfare (1989)
- Pergamon for 4 reciters, 4 orchestral groups and organ (1990)
- The Rejoicing of the Deep Waters (1995)
- Tristia. Fantasy for wind orchestra (1999)
- Symphonic Dances (Hommage à Uuno Klami) (2001)
- Nyt ylös sieluni. Choral ouverture for orchestra (2001)
- Päiwä nyt ehtii ehtoollen. Choral ouverture for orchestra (2002)
- Louhi (2003)
- Lamu. Music in the space for young brass players (2008)
- Minea. Concertante Music for Orchestra (2008)
- Gejia. Chinese Images for Orchestra (2012)
- Maailman kaunein sointu / The most beautiful chord in the world, for youth orchestra (2016)
- Kirje tuolle puolen / Letter to the Beyond, for strings (2018)
- Pictured Within: Birthday Variations for M. C. B. (together with Sally Beamish, Sir Harrison Birtwistle, Richard Blackford, Gavin Bryars, Brett Dean, Dai Fujikura, Wim Henderickx, Colin Matthews, Anthony Payne, John Pickard, David Sawer, Iris ter Schiphorst, Judith Weir)
- Winnipeg Fanfare (2022)

== Concertante ==
=== Piano ===
- Piano Concerto No. 1 (1988–89)
- Piano Concerto No. 2 (for Piano & Strings) (2001–02)
- Mysterium. Piano Concerto for the Left Hand (2025)

=== Strings ===
- Violin Concerto No. 1 (1981)
- Cello Concerto No. 1 (1983–84)
- Double Bass Concerto (2005)
- Viola Concerto (for Viola & Chamber Orchestra) (2006)
- Cello Concerto No. 2 (2013)
- Violin Concerto No. 2 (2015)
- Concerto for Erhu and Chamber Orchestra (2024)
- Loihtu - Ritual Concerto for Violin and Gagaku Orchestra (2024)

=== Woodwinds ===
- Flute Concerto (2002)
- Bassoon Concerto (2004)
- Contrabassoon Concerto (2004–05)
- Clarinet Concerto (2005)
- Oboe Concerto (2007)
- Soprano Saxophone Concerto (for Soprano Saxophone & Chamber Orchestra) (2014–15)
- Tenor Saxophone Concerto (2015)
- Bass Clarinet Concerto (2018)
- Concerto for Recorder and Chamber Orchestra (the one-movement concerto contains sections for bass recorders – C and F –, one passage for alto recorder, and one section for sopranino recorder) (2020)
- Alto Flute Concerto (the 4th movement out of 6 is scored for Bass flute) (2021)
- Simplicius Simplicissimus. Concerto for Piccolo Clarinet & Orchestra (2021)
- Concerto for Piccolo and Orchestra (2025)
- Concerto for Heckelphone and Orchestra (2025)

=== Brass ===
- Tuba Concerto (2000–01)
- Trombone Concerto (2010)
- Trumpet Concerto (for Trumpet & Wind Orchestra) (2011)
- Horn Concerto (for Horn & Chamber Orchestra) (2011)
- Concerto for Baritone horn and Orchestra (2022)

=== Other ===
- Sieidi. Concerto for Percussion & Orchestra (2010)
- Eight Seasons. Concerto for Theremin & Chamber orchestra (2011)
- Timpani Concerto (2015)
- Accordion Concerto (for Accordion, 19 strings & bassoon) (2015–16)
- Mearra. Chamber concerto for harp & 13 strings (2016)
- Concerto for guitar and chamber orchestra (2018)
- Sonata Concertante for Accordion and Strings (1984/2019)
- Concerto for Kantele and Strings (2023)
- Concerto for Erhu und Chamber ensemble (2024)

=== Multiple instruments ===
- Double Concerto for Two Cellos & Orchestra (2003)
- Bells. Concerto for Saxophone Quartet & Orchestra (2008)
- Double Concerto for Cor Anglais, Harp & Orchestra (2014)
- Double Concerto for Two Bassoons & Orchestra (2017-8)
- Triple Concerto for Violin, Cello, Piano & Chamber orchestra (2018)
- Moonlight Concerto. Double Concerto for Viola and Percussion (2020)
- Double Concerto for Flute and Harp (2020)
- Double Concerto for Violin and Cello (2022)

== Chamber/instrumental ==
=== String Quartets ===
- String Quartet No. 1 (1967)
- String Quartet No. 2 (1970)
- String Quartet No. 3 (1971)
- Kimasen lento (Kimanen's Flight) for String Quartet (1998)
- Tango 60 (2012)
- String Quartet No. 4 (2021)
- String Quartet No. 5 (2021)
- Sumussa (Fog) (2023)

=== Quintets ===
- Quintet for Oboe and String Quartet (1973)
- Quintet for Bassoon and String Quartet (1977)
- Quintet for Flute, Oboe, and String Trio (1977)
- Quintet for Alto Saxophone, Bassoon, Viola, Cello, and Double-Bass (1994)
- Quintet for Clarinet and String Quartet (1998)
- Quintet for Flute, Violin, Two Violas, and Cello (2000)
- Wind Quintet No. 1 (2006)
- String Quintet Hommage à Schubert (2009)
- Quintet for Oboe, Clarinet, Bassoon, Horn and Piano (2013)
- Wind Quintet No. 2 (2014)
- Quintet for Horn and String Quartet (2019)
- Mysterium [Piano Quintet] for Piano Left Hand and String quartet (2019)
- Berliner Bagatelle, for wind quintet (2018)

=== Septet ===
- Enoura for Violin and six Gagaku-Instruments (Ryūteki, Hichiriki, Shō, Koto, Biwa and Percussion: Shōko, Kakko und Taiko) (2025)

=== Piano ===
- 19 Preludes for Piano (1965–68)
- Three Small Piano Pieces (1971)
- Piano Sonata No. 1 (1980)
- Two Easy Pieces for Children (1983)
- Sonatina (1993)
- Piano Sonata No. 2 Hommage à Beethoven (2016)
- Seijaku no Uzu (The Whirl of Silence) for Piano left-hand (2021)
- Piano Sonata No.3 Sonata di fantasia (2025)

=== Sonatas for other instruments ===
- Sonata for Violin Solo (1973)
- Oboe Sonata (1985)
- Sonata No. 1 for Accordion (1989)
- Sonata for Two Accordions (1989)
- Sonata No. 2 Black Birds for Accordion (1990)
- Sonata for Guitar (2019)
- Sonata for Cello and Piano (2019)
- Sonata No. 3 for Accordion (2022)
- Sonata for Quarter Tone Accordion (Accordion Sonata No. 4) (2024)

=== Organ ===
- Häämarssi I (Wedding March I) for organ (1973)
- Häämarssi II (Wedding March II) for organ (1976)
- Ludus Solemnis for Organ (1978)
- In Memoriam for Organ (1980)
- Three Interludes for Organ (1993)
- Hääsoitto (Wedding Music) for organ (1999)
- Alles Vergängliche. Symphony for organ (2007)
- Nyt ylös sieluni. Chorale prelude for organ (2001/2015)
- Päiwä nyt ehtii ehtoollen. Chorale prelude for organ (2002/2015)
- Herr Gott, erhalt uns für und für (Chorale Prelude for Organ; 2017)

=== Other ===
- Solo, for various instruments
  - Solo I for Violin (1975)
  - Solo II for Piano (1985)
  - Solo III for Flute (1990–91)
  - Solo IV for Cello (1997)
  - Solo V for Bassoon (1999)
  - Solo VI for Double-Bass (1999)
  - Solo VII for Trumpet (2000)
  - Solo VIII for Baritone Horn (2003)
  - Solo IX for Oboe (2010)
  - Solo X for Horn (2010)
  - Solo XI (Hommage à Munir Bashir) for guitar (2013)
  - Solo XII (In memoriam EJR) (Einojuhani Rautavaara) for Viola (2016)
  - Solo XIII for Trombone (2017)
  - Solo XIV for Clarinet (2018)
  - Solo XV for Marimba (2018)
  - Solo XVI (Ballade) for Harp (2019)
  - Solo XVII for Clavichord (2020)
  - Solo XVIII for Tuba (2021)
- Quartet for Flute, Saxophone, Guitar, and Percussion (1982)
- Seven Inventions and Postlude for oboe and cello (1986–1998)
- Epilogue for Trombone and Organ (1998)
- Ballad for Flute, Cello, Bassoon and Piano (1999)
- Three Tangos for Violin, Accordion, Guitar, Piano and Double-Bass (1999)
- Trio for Clarinet, Viola, and Piano (2006)
- HAHE for 4 cellos (2008)
- In memoriam Pehr Henrik Nordgren for Violin Solo (2009)
- Quasi una fantasia for Horn and Organ (2011)
- ARS for 4 cellos (2012)
- EAREGBERG for 4 cellos (2013)
- ERA for 4 cellos (2013)
- Viisi myyttistä kuvaa (Five Mythological Images) for Oboe solo (2015)
- ER-OS for Violin and Clarinet (2015)
- Two Chorale Preludes for Organ (2015)
  - 1. Päiwä nyt ehtii ehtoollen
  - 2. Nyt ylös sieluni
- Partita for Cello and Guitar (2016)
- Elegy for Contraforte and Piano (2016)
- La Violina for 4 Violins (2017)
- Lied for oboe and piano (2017)
- Quartet for Accordion and String Trio (2019)
- Sonata concertante for Accordion and String Quintet (2 violins, viola, cello, double bass; arrangement of Sonata No. 1 for accordion; 2019)
- Venematka (Barcarole) for Cello and Piano (2019)
- Am Horizont for Viola (2020)
- La Tombeau de J.K. for Violin and Piano (2022)
- Ruija for Flute, Cello and Video (2023)
- Kumaus, Trio for Accordion, Double Bass and Percussion (2023)

== Vocal ==
- Lasimaalaus (Stained Glass) for female choir (1974); text Aila Meriluoto
- Kolme laulua elämästä (Three Songs of Life) for tenor and piano (1977); text Raimo Lehmonen
- Kyynikon paratiisi (The Paradise of the Cynic), cabaret song for tenor and 10 instrumentalists (or for tenor and piano) (1991); text Esko-Pekka Tiitinen
- Veet välkkyy taas for male choir (1992); text Viljo Kojo
- Mysteerio for female choir (1994); text Maritza Núñez
- Ilo ja epäsymmetria (Joy and Asymmetry), Suite for mixed choir (1996); text Mirkka Rekola
- Kiinalaisia lauluja (Chinese Songs) for Soprano and Orchestra (1997); text by ancient Chinese poets, Finnish translation Pertti Nieminen
- Kolme Bertrandin monologia (Three Monologues of Bertrand) for Baritone and Orchestra (1998); text Paavo Rintala and Kalevi Aho
- Kysymysten kirja (Book of Questions) for Mezzo-soprano and Chamber Orchestra (2006); text Pablo Neruda, Finnish translation Katja Kallio
- Kolme Mawlana Rumin runoa (Three Poems of Mawlana Rumi) for mixed choir (2010); text Mawlana Rumi, Finnish translation Jaakko Hämeen-Anttila
- Sateen aikaan (Rain Time); Five Songs for Mezzo-soprano and String Quartet on Poems by Tuomas Anhava (2017)
- Hauki ja naakka (The Pike and the Jackdaw); two songs for baritone and harp (or piano) (2020). 1. Hauen laulu [The Song of the Pike], text Aaro Hellaakoski; 2. Keltainen naakka [The Yellow Jackdaw], text P. Mustapää
- Four Christmas Carols for Mixed choir (2025)

== Arrangements ==
- Songs and Dances of Death (Modest Mussorgsky); instrumentation of the song cycle for bass and orchestra (1984)
- J. S. Bach: Contrapunctus XI; orchestration of the work (1984)
- Lauluseppele [The Song Garland] Leevi Madetoja; arrangement of the cantata for male choir a cappella (1987)
- Pyörteitä [Whirls], 1st Act Uuno Klami; orchestration of the ballet act (1988)
- Erik Tulindberg: String Quartets I-VI (composed in the 1780s); completion of the quartets (1995)
- Karelia (Jean Sibelius); completion and reconstruction of the work (1997)
- Vom Himmel hoch (Michael Praetorius); instrumentation of the double choir motet for orchestra and organ (1998)
- Lakeus Yrjö Kilpinen; instrumentation of the song cycle for baritone and orchestra (1998)
- J. S. Bach: Präludium und Fuga in C ("Con largo", BWV 545); instrumentation of the work for symphony orchestra, chamber orchestra and 10 off-stage musicians (2005)
- Jean Sibelius: Promootiokantaatti 1897 [Cantata for the University Graduation Ceremonies 1897]; reconstruction and completion of the choir parts of the cantata for mixed choir and piano (2010)
- J. S. Bach: Contrapunctus XIV from Die Kunst der Fuge; completion of the unfinished work for organ (or for string orchestra or string quartet) (2011)
- Einojuhani Rautavaara: Sérenade pour mon amour for violin and orchestra (2016); completion of the work (2018)
- Cinq morceaux op. 75 (Jean Sibelius), instrumentation of the cycle for chamber orchestra (2024)
- Bernhard Henrik Crusell: Airs Suédois for bassoon and piano; editing and correction of the original piano score (2025)
- Pehr Henrik Nordgren: String quintet, op. 110; arrangement for string orchestra (2026)
