= Ikäläinen =

Ikäläinen is a Finnish surname. Notable people with the surname include:

- Joonas Ikäläinen (born 1982), Finnish footballer
- Jukka Ikäläinen (born 1957), Swedish footballer

== See also ==
- Ihalainen
