= Herbert Lomas =

Herbert Lomas may refer to:

- Herbert Lomas (poet) (1924–2011), British poet and translator
- Herbert Lomas (actor) (1887–1961), British actor
