= Mikael Sundman =

Finnish architect and writer

Mikael Sundman is a Finnish architect and writer. He wrote the polemical book Kenen Helsinki? (Whose Helsinki?) (1970) together with Vilhelm Helander, and received the Eino Leino Prize in 1971.

In late 1980s and early 1990s he drew general plans for a new residential area for 7000 people in Helsinki, known as Arabianranta.
