= Jyrki Pellinen =

Finnish writer

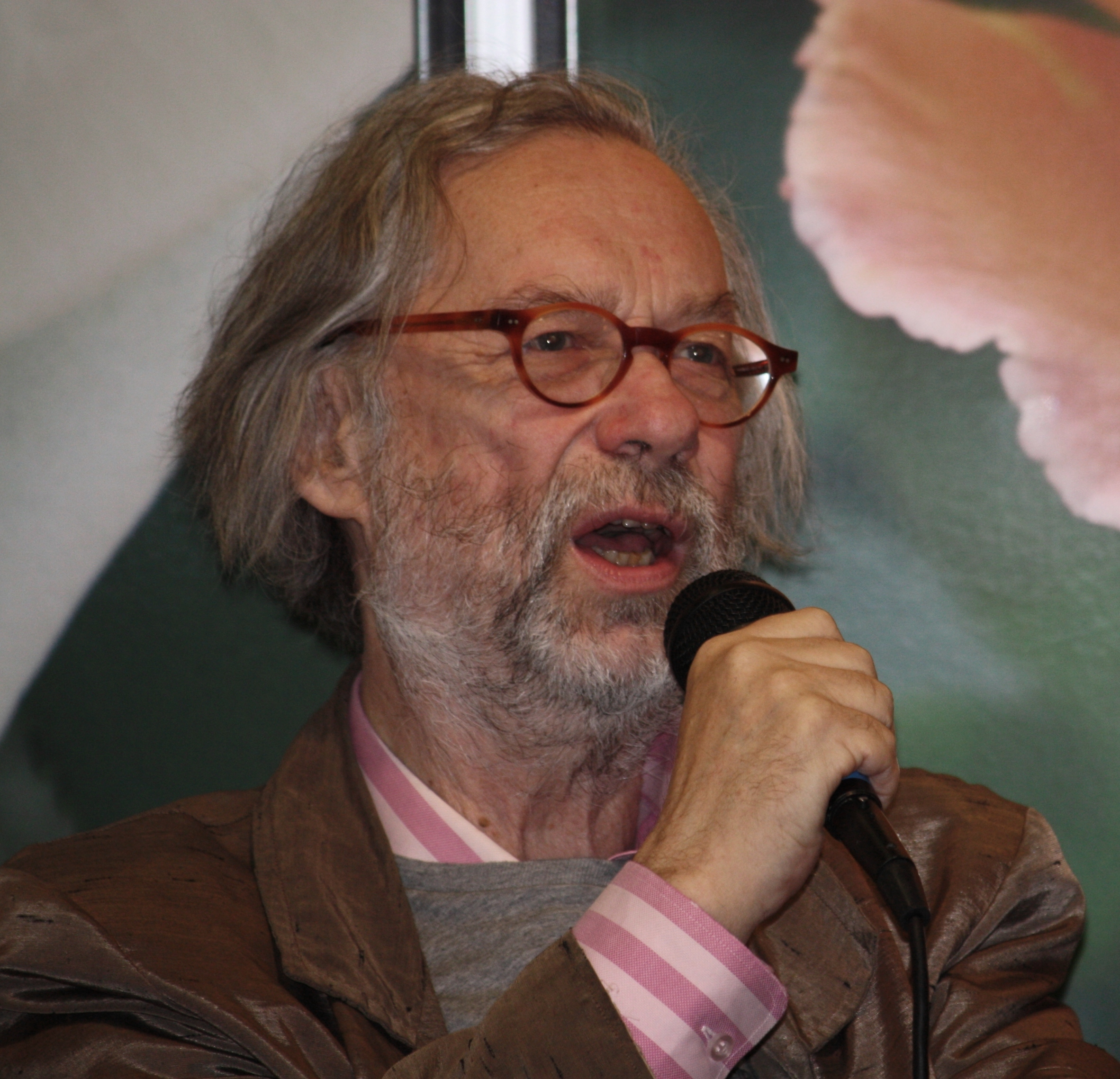
Jyrki Pellinen

Jyrki Pellinen (born May 16, 1940, in Helsinki) is a Finnish writer, poet and visual artist. He has published over 50 fiction books, and was the 1988 recipient of the Eino Leino Prize.
