= Raija Siekkinen =

Raija Siekkinen (pronounced Ri-a) (11 February 1953 – 7 February 2004) was a Finnish writer and recipient of the Eino Leino Prize in 1998.

== Life ==
Siekkinen graduated from the University of Helsinki with a degree in literature and philosophy in 1981. Since 1978, she has published more than a dozen novels and children's books. She has also worked as a translator.

Her first collection of short stories published in German, How Love Is Created, was published in Zurich in 2014.

== awards ==
- 1989: Honorary diploma, German Booksellers Association, Leipzig for Tyttö, puu ja peili.
- 1993: Runeberg Prize for Metallin maku.
- 1998: Eino Leino Prize.

== Publications ==
- Talven tulo . Otava, Helsinki 1978.
- Tuomitut . Otava, Helsinki 1982.
- Eläman keskipste . Otava, Helsinki 1983.
- Pieni valhe . Otava, Helsinki 1986.
- Herra kuningas. Children's book. Illustrated by Hannu Taina . Otava, Helsinki 1986.
- Tytö, puu yes peili. Children's book. Illustrated by Hannu Taina. Otava, Helsinki 1987.
- Utelias fauni. Children's book. Otava, Helsinki 1988.
- Saari . Otava, Helsinki 1988.
- Jttiläi scale. Children's book. Otava, Helsinki 1991.
- Kuinka rakkaus syntyy . Otava, Helsinki 1991.
- Metallin maku . Otava, Helsinki 1992.
- Häiriö maisemassa . Otava, Helsinki 1994.
- Kaunis nimi . Otava, Helsinki 1996.
- Se tapahtui täällja. Otava, Helsinki 1999.
- Kallisti ostetut paivät. Otava Helsinki 2002.
- Novellit . Otava, Helsinki 2007.
