= Jukka Vieno =

Finnish writer and poet (born 1957)

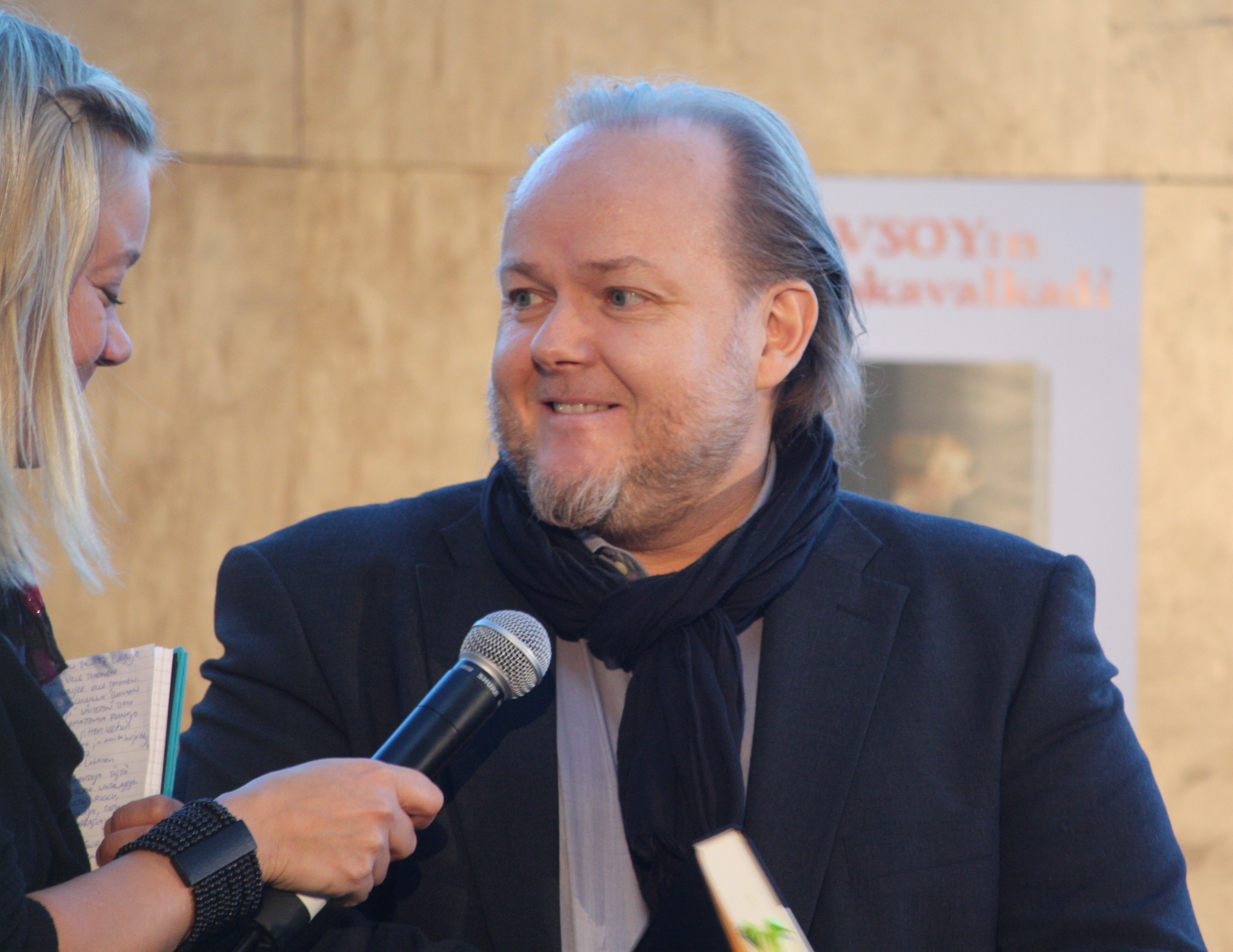
Vieno in 2010

Jukka Sakari Vieno (born 4 April 1957 in Ilmajoki) is a Finnish writer and recipient of the Eino Leino Prize in 1978.
