= Elvi Sinervo =

Finnish writer

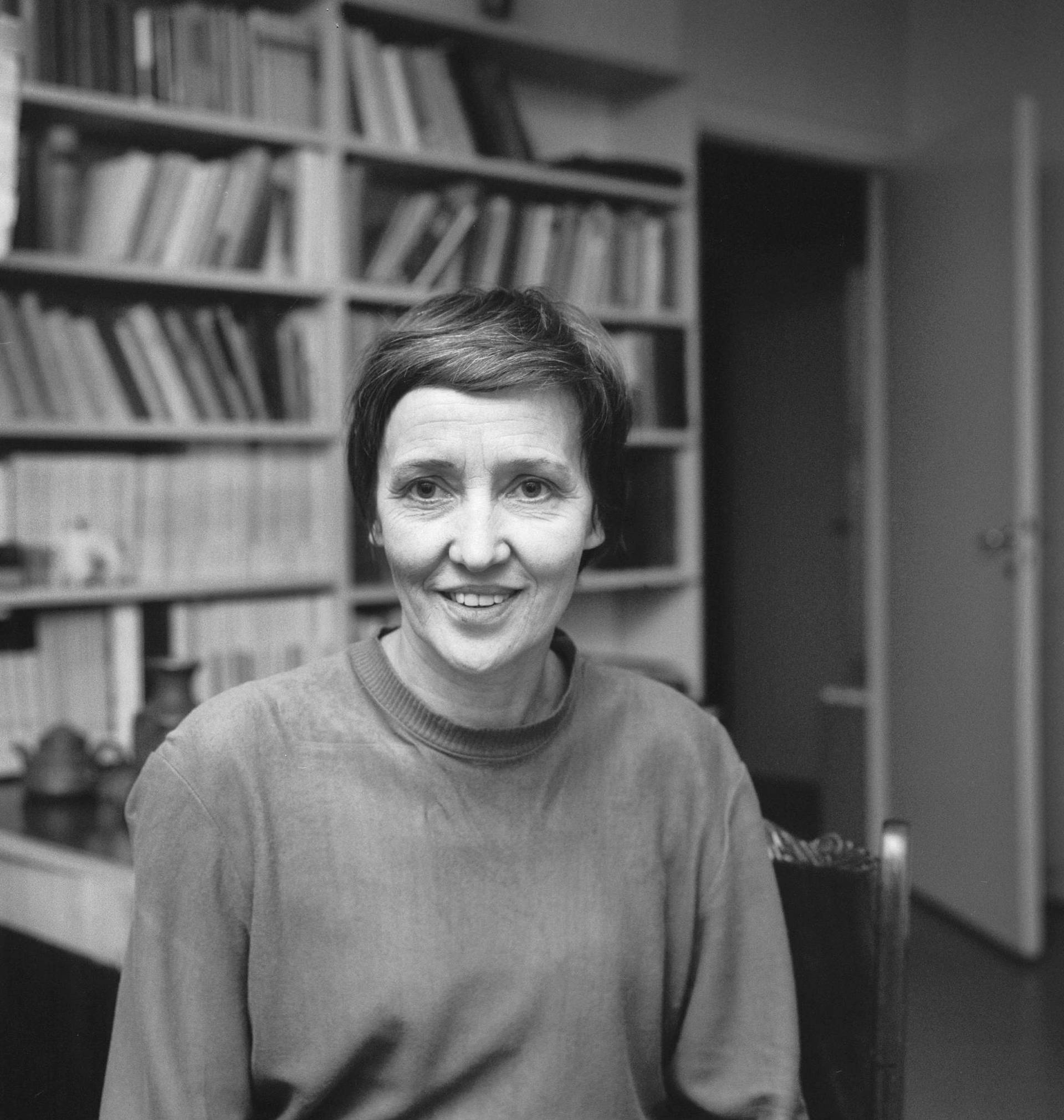
Sinervo in 1961.

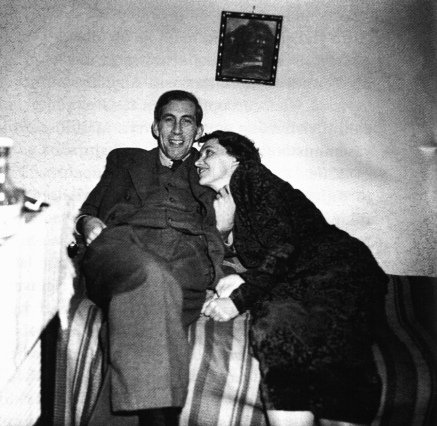
Elvi Sinervo with her husband, the Member of Parliament Mauri Ryömä in 1950.

Elvi Aulikki Sinervo (4 May 1912, Helsinki – 28 August 1986 Helsinki) was a Finnish writer, poet, and translator. She was the recipient of the Eino Leino Prize in 1980. She married member of parliament Mauri Ryömä (1911–58). Their daughter is translator Liisa Ryömä.

== Works ==
Sinervo's first work Runo Söörnäisistä (A Poem about Söörnäinen, 1937) is a collection of short stories about working-class life in Helsinki. Her next work, Palavankylän seppä (The Smith of Palavankylä, 1939) is a novel about Hermanni Rintaluoma, a man who comes back to the country after the Civil War and tries to begin a new life amongst hatred and suspicion. Her another collection of short stories, Vuorelle nousu (A Climb to the Mountain, 1948) is about the experiences related to the underground Communist movement in the country. Her other significant works include her novels Viljami Vaihdokas (Viljami the Changelin, 1946) and Toveri, älä petä (Comrade, Don't Betray, 1947).

The Finnish translation of the State Anthem of the Soviet Union was written by Sinervo.
