= Kerttu Kauniskangas =

Finnish writer

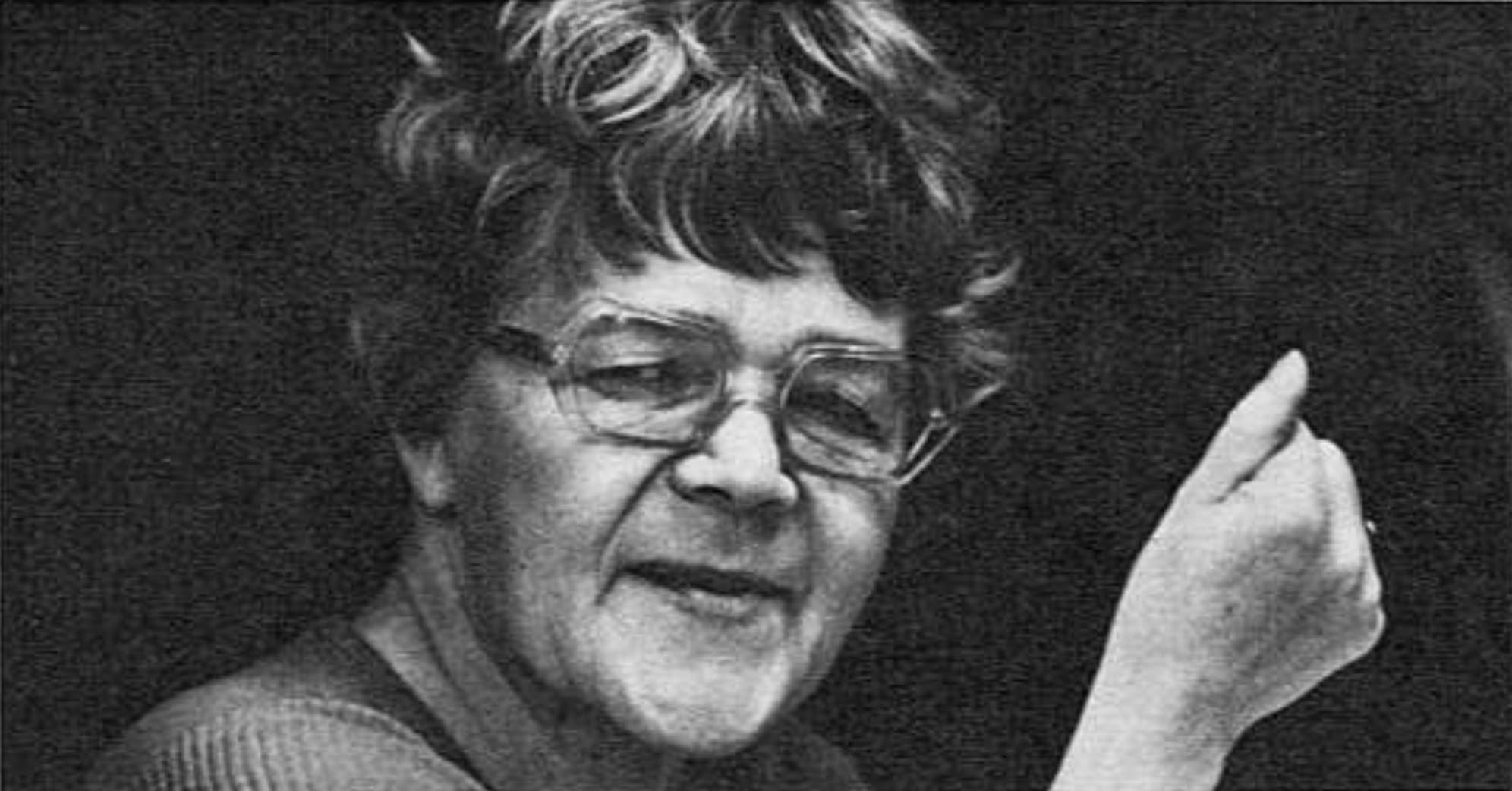
Kerttu Kauniskangas

Kerttu Kauniskangas (19 March 1920, Oulu – 25 October 1998) was a Finnish writer and recipient of the Eino Leino Prize in 1968.
