= Caj Westerberg =

Finnish poet and translator (born 1946)

- Born: Caj Torsten Westerberg; 14 June 1946 (age 80); Porvoo, Uusimaa, Finland
- Occupations: Poet; translator
- Writing career
- Notable awards: Eino Leino Prize (1995)

Caj Torsten Westerberg (born 14 June 1946 in Porvoo) is a Finnish poet and translator. Among his several awards, he is the recipient of the Eino Leino Prize in 1995, State Prize for Translation in 1984 and State Prize for Literature twice, in 1970 and 1986. In 2012 he was the recipient of the Dancing Bear Poetry Prize, awarded by Finnish Broadcasting Company, for his poetry translations of the Swedish poet Tomas Tranströmer.

== Works ==
- Onnellisesti valittaen, 1967
- Runous, 1968
- En minä ole ainoa kerta, 1969
- Uponnut Venetsia, 1972
- Äänesi, 1974
- Kallista on ja halvalla menee, 1975
- Reviirilaulu, 1978
- Elämän puu, 1981
- Kirkas nimetön yö, 1985
- Toteutumattomat kaupungit, Runoja 1967–1985, 1987
- Että näkyisi valona vedessä, 1991
- Läikehtien rientävät pilvinä kivet, 1992
- Ataraksia, 2003
- Yönmusta, sileä, 2011
