= Bertel Jung =

Finnish architect (1872–1946)

Professori Bertel Jung
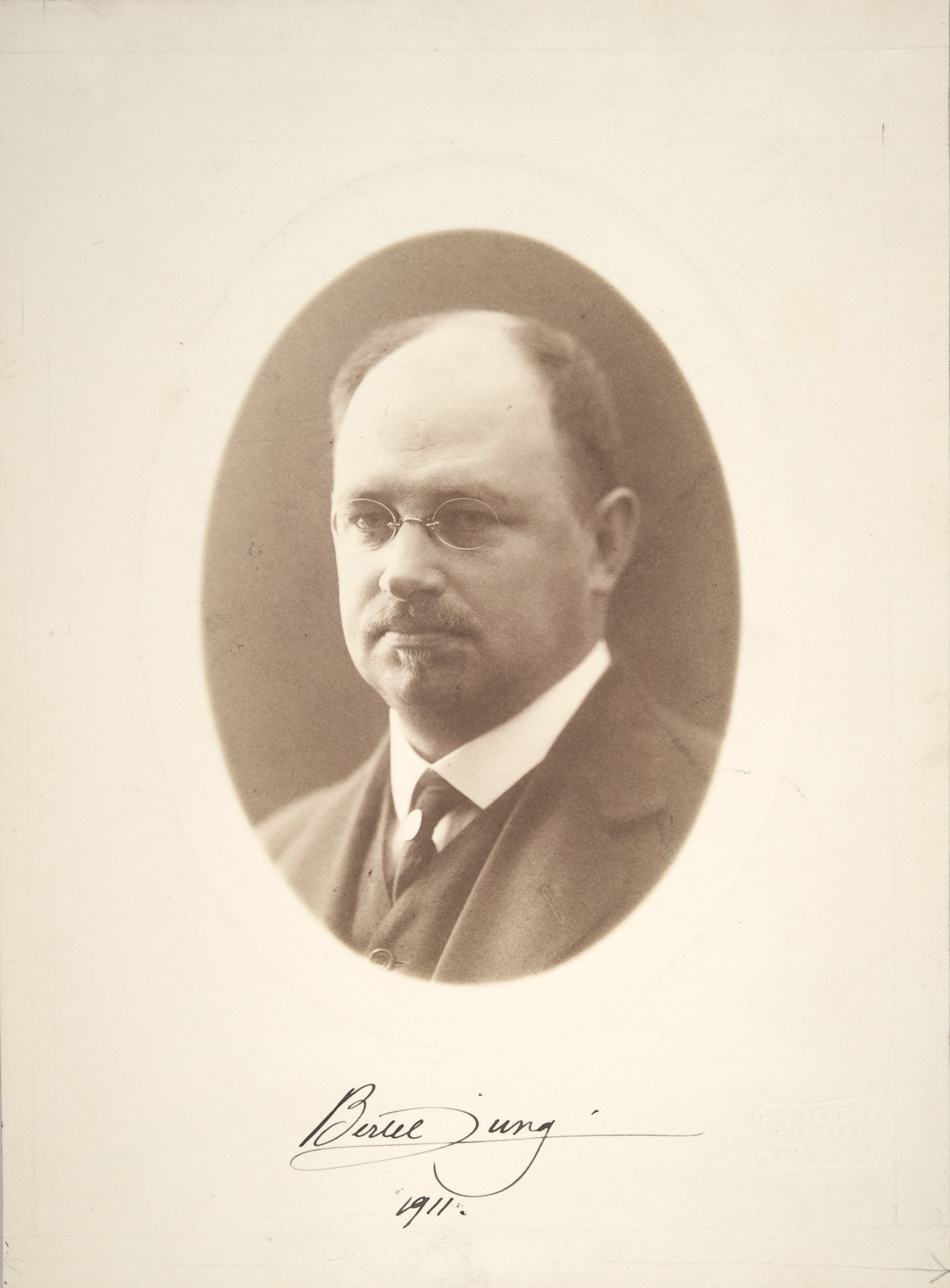
- Jung in 1911
- Born: 11 July 1872; Jakobstad, Grand Duchy of Finland
- Died: 12 May 1946 (aged 73); Helsinki, Finland
- Education: Polytechnical Institute
- Occupation: Architect

(Axel) Bertel Jung (11 July 1872 — 12 May 1946) was a Finnish architect and urban planner, notable as Finland's first official zoning architect and a pioneer in the field of city planning.

== Early life and education ==
Axel Bertel Jung was born in Jakobstad, on the west coast of Finland, to insurance clerk Axel Gabriel Jung and Sofia née Brunberg.

Jung completed his secondary education in 1891, and went on to study architecture at the Polytechnical Institute (later Helsinki University of Technology, now part of Aalto University), graduating there in 1895, after which he went to further his studies at the Royal School of Art in Berlin.

In 1903, he married Gunborg née Hausen.

== Career ==
In 1908, Jung was appointed to lead the City of Helsinki zoning and planning activity, as the first official to hold such a post in the country. He played a key role in the overall design of the city centre, as well as the master plans of several districts of Helsinki, including Kulosaari, Herttoniemi, Haaga, Meilahti and Munkkiniemi. He produced the first plans for the Helsinki Central Park. He also had a hand in the urban designs of Turku, Vyborg, Oulu, Porvoo, Vaasa and Mariehamn, among others.

During his career, Jung collaborated with several notable architects, including Lars Sonck, Karl Hård af Segerstad, and Eliel Saarinen. Together with Sonck and Saarinen, Jung is credited with bringing Finnish urban design into the 20th century. For many years he jointly with his younger brother and fellow architect, Valter Jung, ran the design bureau Jung & Jung.

He was also a prolific writer and an influential architectural theorist, among other things editing Finnish Architectural Review from 1903 to 1905.

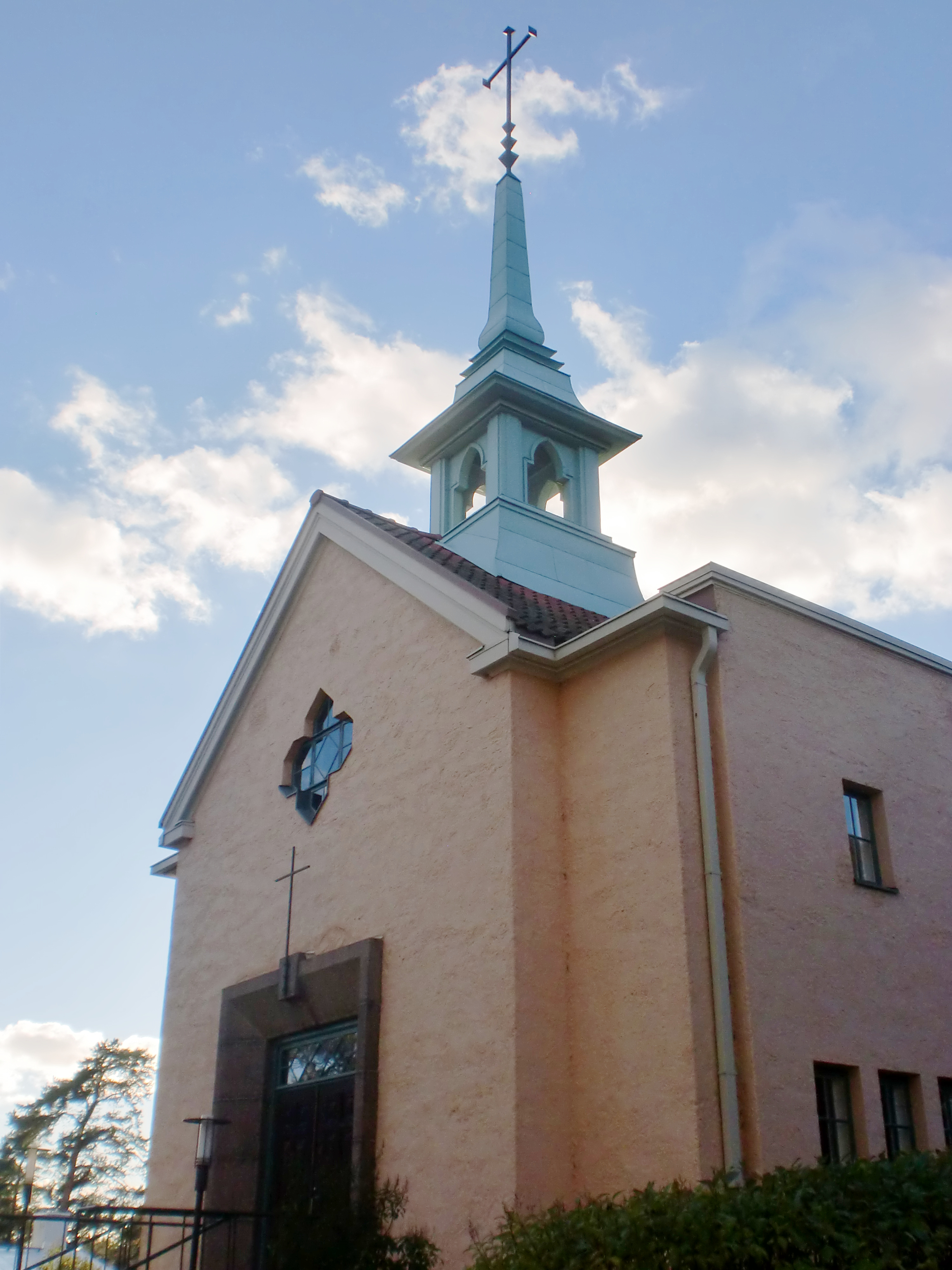
Kulosaari Church (1935), designed by Jung

== Awards and honours ==
In 1942, the honorary title of Professori was conferred on Bertel Jung in recognition of his career achievements.

A square in Espoo is named after him, as is a street in Oulu.
