= Heikki Palmu =

Finnish writer

Heikki Palmu (born in 1946) is a Finnish writer and recipient of the Eino Leino Prize in 1970.
