= Nuori Voima =

Finnish literary magazine

- Former editors: Martti-Tapio Kuuskoski, Vesa Rantama, Maaria Ylikangas, Silja Hiidenheimo, Tarja Roinila
- Categories: Literary magazine
- Frequency: Four times a year
- Founded: 1908; 118 years ago
- Company: Nuoren Voiman Liitto
- Country: Finland
- Based in: Helsinki
- Language: Finnish
- Website: Nuori Voima

Nuori Voima (Finnish: Youthful Vigor) is a Finnish literary and cultural magazine which has been published since 1908. It is headquartered in Helsinki, Finland. Both the magazine and its parent organization, Nuoren Voiman Liitto, are among the well-respected institutions in Finland.

== History and profile ==
Nuori Voima was founded in 1908. The magazine was founded and published by the Nuoren Voiman Liitto (Finnish: The Union of Young Powers), a non-profit literature organization. It comes out five times a year. The magazine produces thematic issues and features literary work and articles written about art, philosophy, culture and society. It has a twice per year literary critic supplement, Kritiikki. The magazine has also an annual poetry issue.

== Contributors and editors ==
In the early years a group of poets who would be known as Tulenkantajat (Finnish: Torch Bearers) from 1924 were the regular contributors of Nuori Voima. Some of its significant international contributors include French philosophers Roland Barthes, Jacques Derrida and Michel Foucault and Jacques Lacan. The magazine also featured work by Walter Benjamin, Mikhail Bakhtin and Peter Sloterdijk. Finnish poet Olavi Paavolainen started his career in the magazine.

Martti-Tapio Kuuskoski served as the editor-in-chief of Nuori Voima. Jukka Koskelainen and Jyrki Kiiskinen were among its former editors-in-chief, and the latter held the post between 1991 and 1994.
