= Ihalainen =

Ihalainen is a Finnish surname. Notable people with the surname include:

- Lauri Ihalainen (born 1947), Finnish trade union leader and politician
- J. K. Ihalainen (born 1957), Finnish poet
- Marianne Ihalainen (born 1967), Finnish ice hockey player

== Fictional characters ==
- Anna Ihalainen from Finnish TV soap opera Salatut elämät
- Antti and Anna-Liisa Ihalainen, protagonists from the film Borrowing Matchsticks, as well from the original Finnish novel and the previous 1938 Finnish film with the same name
