= Kulosaari Cemetery =

Cemetery in Helsinki, Finland

Kulosaari cemetery
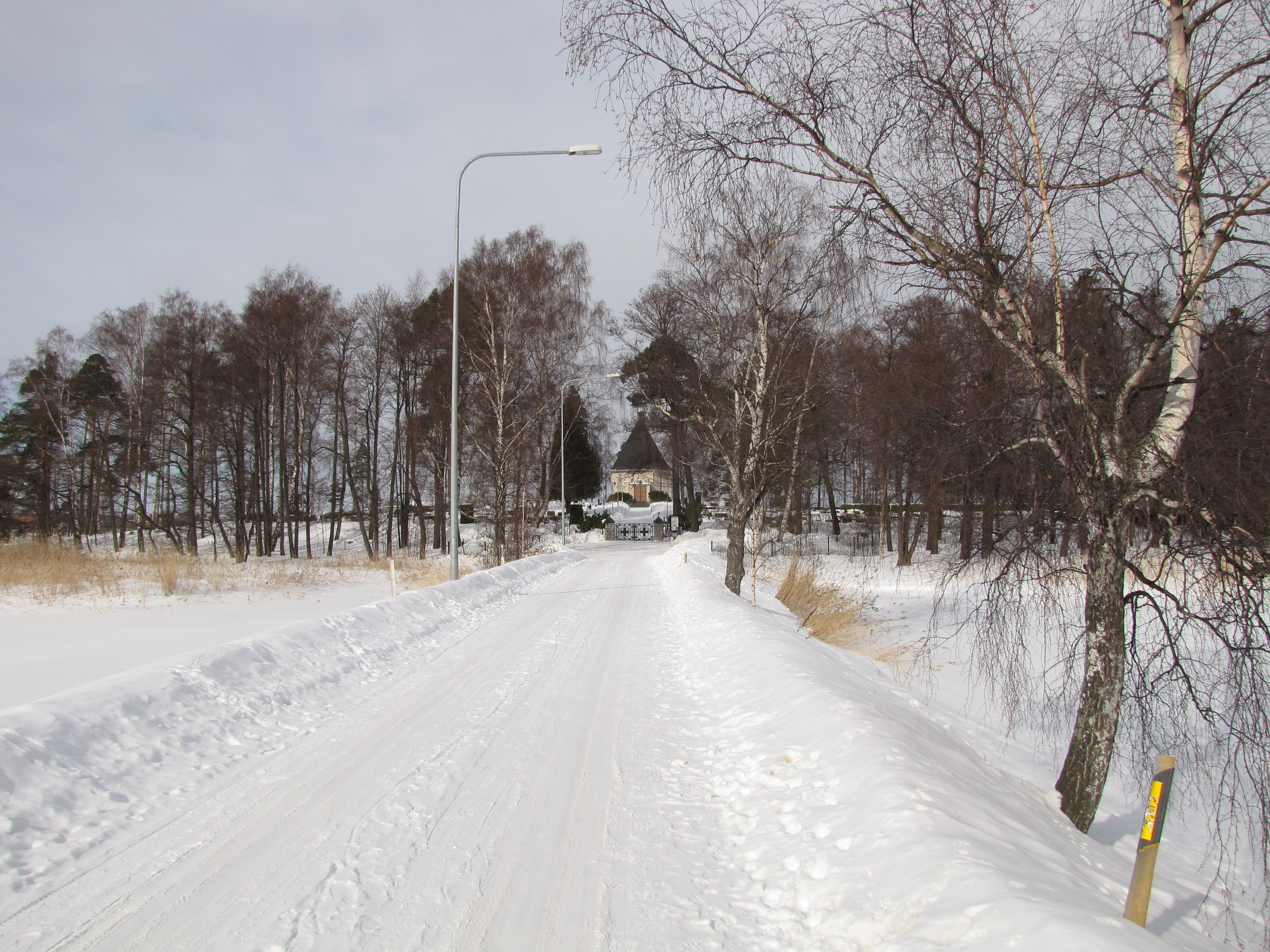
- Kulosaari cemetery and chapel
- Interactive map of Kulosaari cemetery

Details
- Established: 1925
- Location: Kulosaari, Helsinki
- Country: Finland
- Coordinates: 60°11′28″N 025°00′03″E
- Type: Public
- Owned by: Federation of Evangelical Lutheran Parishes in Helsinki
- Website: www.helsinginseurakunnat.fi
- Find a Grave: Kulosaari cemetery

The Kulosaari cemetery (Finnish: Kulosaaren hautausmaa, Finnish: Leposaaren hautausmaa, Swedish: Brändö begravningsplats) is the smallest cemetery in Helsinki parish union. It is situated on Iso-pässi island (later Leposaari island) in Kulosaari district of Helsinki. It was inaugurated in 1925. The cemetery chapel was designed by architect Armas Lindgren and added in 1927. There is also an area for war heroes' graves.

== Description ==
Kulosaari cemetery covers an area of about two hectares.

== Notable interments ==
- Erik Heinrichs (1890–1965), general
- Hannes Kolehmainen (1889–1966), Olympic medalist runner
- Armas Lindgren (1874–1929), architect and artist
- Paavo Talvela (1897–1973), general
- Ilmari Turja (1901–1998), journalist and playwright
- Kustaa Vilkuna (1902–1980), historian and linguist
- Vilhelm Helander (1941-2025), professor and architect

== See also ==
- Kulosaari Church
