= Hannu Mäkelä (writer) =

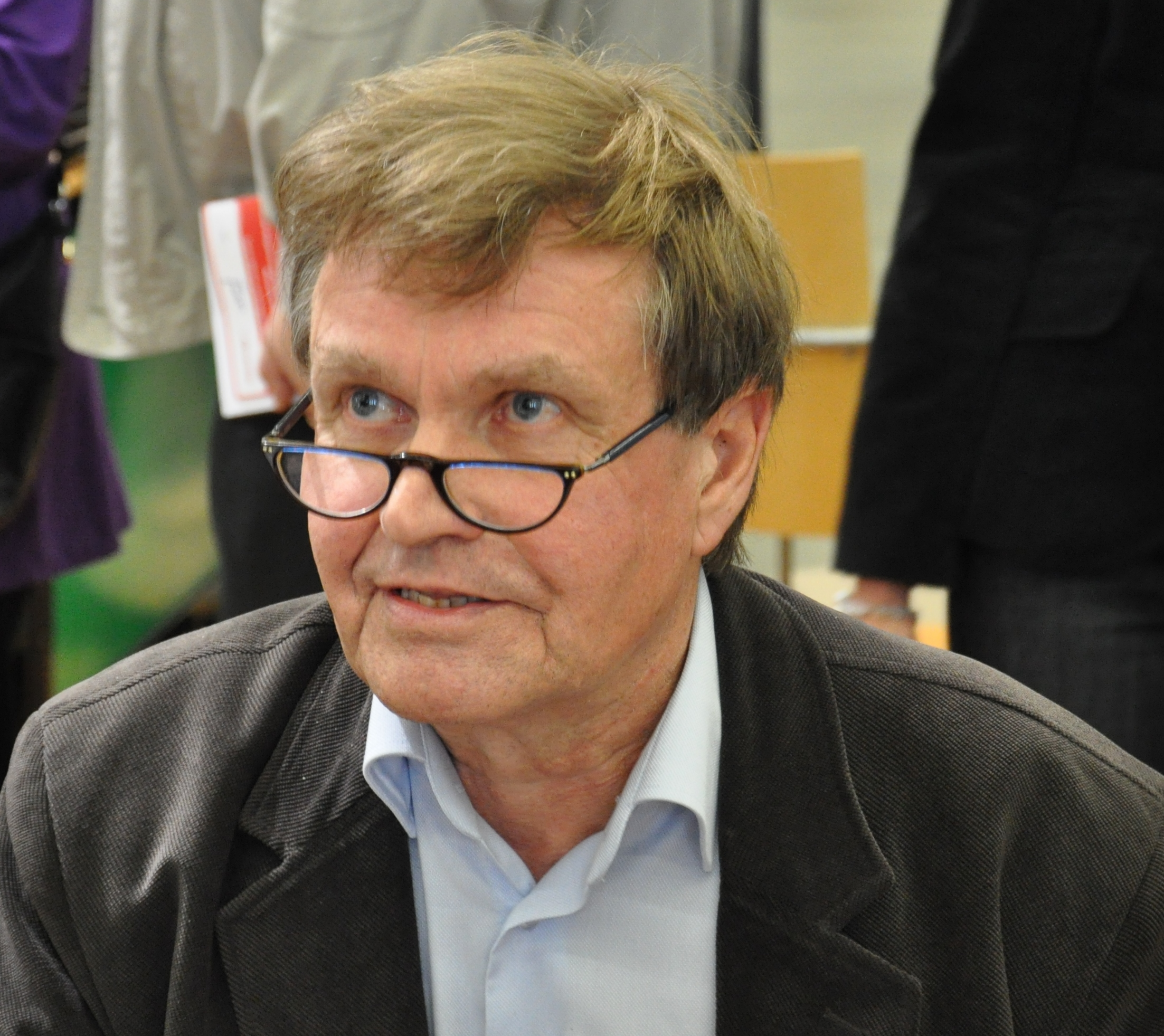
Hannu Mäkelä in 2009

Hannu Mäkelä (born 18 August 1943 in Helsinki, Finland) is an author of more than 100 books in Finnish: novels, collections of short stories, edited anthologies and children's books. Hannu Mäkelä is known for his books for children in many countries around the world, especially the Herra Huu (Mr Boo) series.

== Career ==
Mäkelä writes for both adults and children. The Herra Huu series for children is fantasy about a wizard.

Mäkelä's children's books have been published in Hungary, Bulgaria, the Czech Republic, Latvia, and are especially popular in Russia. His success in Russia has been explained as a result of his friendship with the writer Eduard Uspensky.

== Personal life ==
Mäkelä has been married five times. His first marriage was to the children's writer Maikki Harjanne; they had one son. His fourth wife, Svetlana Aksjonova, whom he married in 2011, died in 2017. He married again in 2020.

== Awards ==
- The State Literature Prize, Kirjallisuuden valtionpalkinto
- The Eino Leino Prize, 1982
- The Finlandia Prize, 1995
- Commander, Order of the Lion of Finland

== Works ==
=== Novels ===
- Traveling all the time (1965)
