= Ristović =

Ristović (Serbian: Ристовић) is a Serbian patronymic surname derived from a masculine given name Risto. It may refer to:

- Ana Ristović (born 1972), Serbian poet and translator
- Milan Ristović (born 1953), historian
- Nikolina Ristović (born 1976), television presenter
- Predrag Ristović (born 1975), footballer
- Risto Ristović (born 1988), footballer
