= Kolmannen valtakunnan vieraana =

Kolmannen Valtakunnan vieraana (English: Guest of the Third Reich) is an essayistic book by Finnish writer Olavi Paavolainen based on his visit to Nazi Germany and the Nuremberg Rally in 1936.

Paavolainen, among a handful of other writers from the Nordic countries was invited to visit the Travemünde retreat of a German writers' group supported by the Nazi Government with the intention to promote its views amongst Nordic authors. The group took its visitors around Northern Germany to see sights that were considered beneficial for promoting the Nazi ideology. The visitors were also invited to the massive Nuremberg Rally, which Paavolainen seemed to found rather overwhelming, in regard to both ideological and aesthetical aspects, as it is discussed throughout the book.

Whilst in Germany, Paavolainen met Nazi politicians, writers, young enthusiasts, and intellectuals and attended an assembly of the female wing of NSDAP where Joseph Goebbels was addressing the female audience. In the book, Paavolainen described the female crowd with disdain and wrote in reference to Goebbels:

This small man is all nerves and brain - heart and soul are missing. His vanity is obvious.

Kolmannen Valtakunnan vieraana was a major success, but it was also seen as ambiguous and was widely debated when it was published in December 1936.

== Extract ==
It is an old truth, that fanaticism does not tolerate bantering. The young Nazis, who, under normal circumstances are joyful, sociable and great humorists, turned grave like Repenter monks, when the conversation turned to the dogmas of national socialism.

== External links and sources ==
- https://web.archive.org/web/20061113232537/http://mikaeli.mikkeliamk.fi/mikaeli/arkisto/tutkimus/aunus/
- Petri Liukkonen. "Olavi Paavolainen". Books and Writers.
