= Kulosaari Church =

- Kulosaaren kirkko, Brändö kyrka
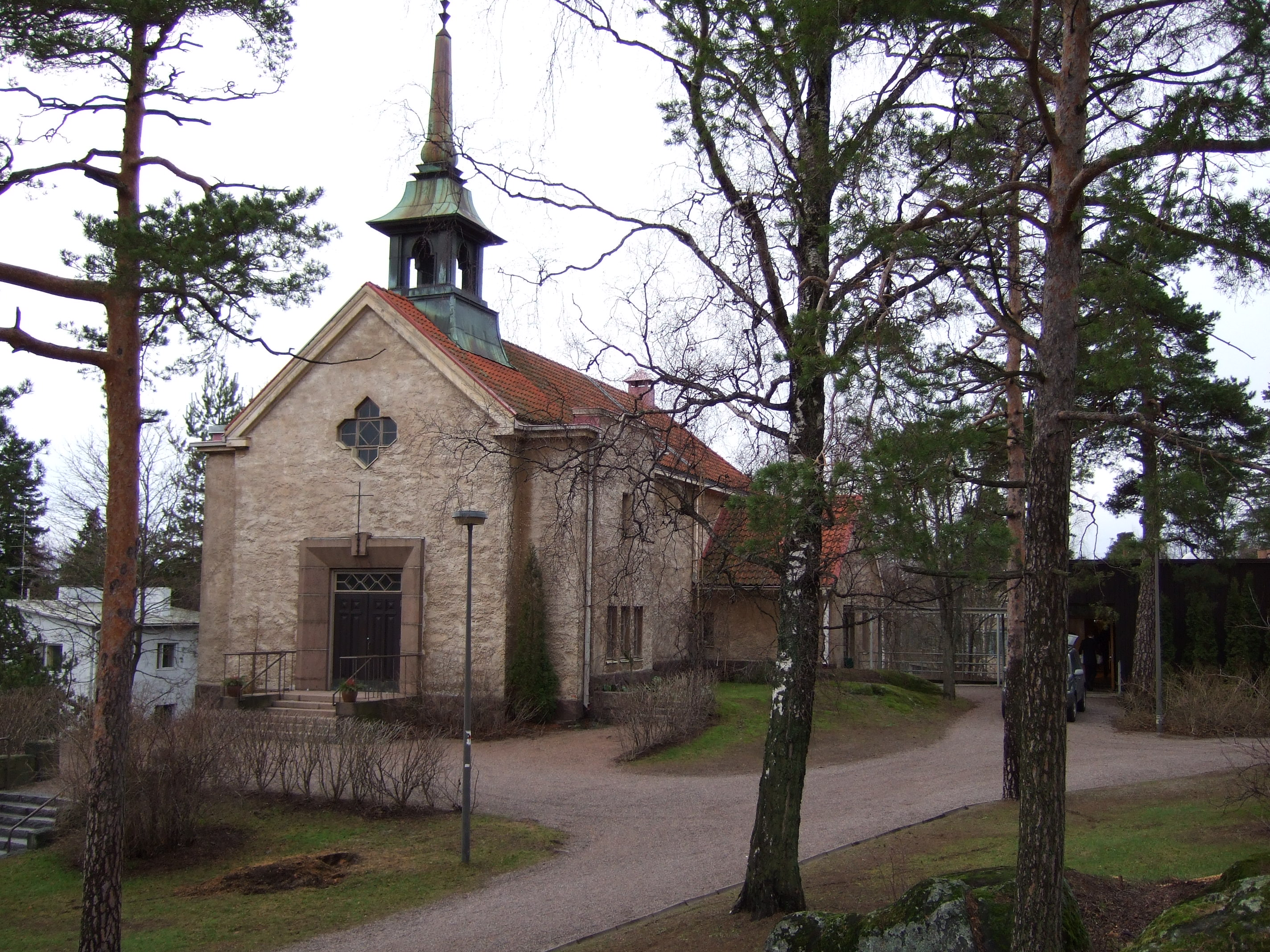
- Kulosaari Church in 2007
- Kulosaari Church
- 60.184694°N 25.010628°E
- Location: Kulosaari, Helsinki
- Country: Finland
- Denomination: Lutheran
- Website: www.helsinginseurakunnat.fi/kulosaarenkirkko.html.stx

History
- Status: Parish church
- Consecrated: December 1935

Architecture
- Functional status: Active
- Heritage designation: Protected
- Architects: Bertel Jung; Armas Lindgren (belfry)
- Style: Jugendstil
- Completed: 1935 (belfry 1931)

Specifications
- Materials: Masonry

Administration
- Parish: Herttoniemi parish

Kulosaari Church (Finnish: Kulosaaren kirkko, Swedish: Brändö kyrka) is a Lutheran church located in the Kulosaari suburb of Helsinki, Finland.

== History ==
The Kulosaari parish was established in 1921, and the planning for a church began immediately; however, it took more than a decade before the current church building was completed in 1935.

The church is located on top of the tallest hill in Kulosaari, and became soon after its completion known locally as "the Temple on the Hill".

== Architecture ==
The main church building was designed in Jugendstil style by Bertel Jung, who was also responsible for the overall urban plan of Kulosaari.

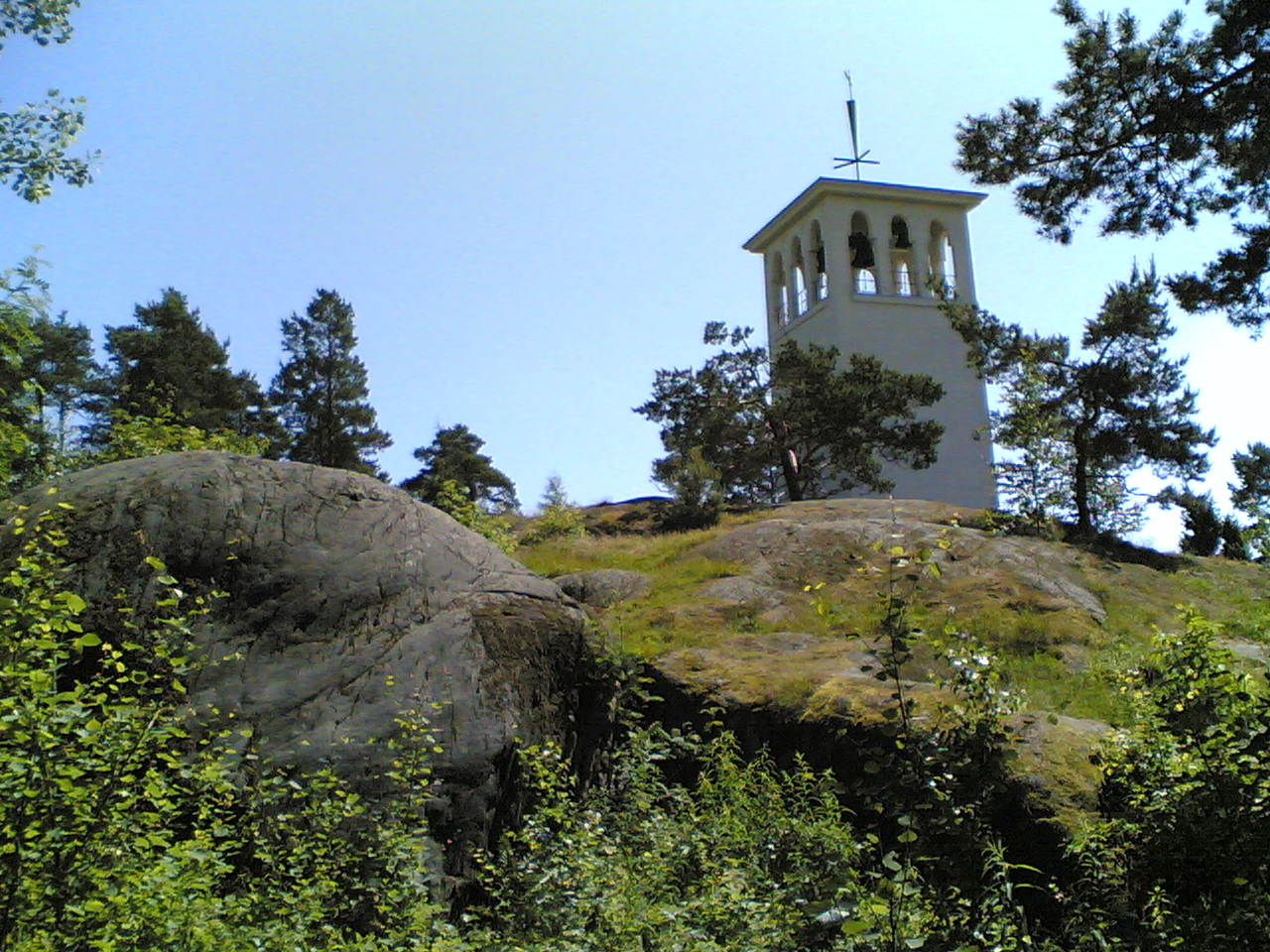
Belfry

The separate belfry, completed four years before the church itself, and standing c. 30 metres (98 ft) from the church building, was initially designed by Armas Lindgren, and completed after his death by his daughter, architect Helena Stenij.

The church and its surrounding milieu have been designated and protected by the Finnish Heritage Agency as a nationally important built cultural environment (Valtakunnallisesti merkittävä rakennettu kulttuuriympäristö).

=== Interior design ===
The ceiling and the stained-glass window were designed by Armas Lindgren's son-in-law, artist Antti Salmenlinna.

Bertel Jung's daughter, interior architect Gunilla Jung, designed various interior features including the silver baptismal font, while his niece, textile artist Dora Jung, designed the priest's chasuble in white silk velvet.

== See also ==
- Kulosaari Cemetery
