= Nils-Börje Stormbom =

Finnish writer

Nils-Börje Stormbom (26 September 1925 in Vaasa – 26 November 2016 Vaasa) was a Finnish writer and recipient of the Eino Leino Prize in 1977.
