= Sirkka Turkka =

Finnish poet and author (1939–2021)

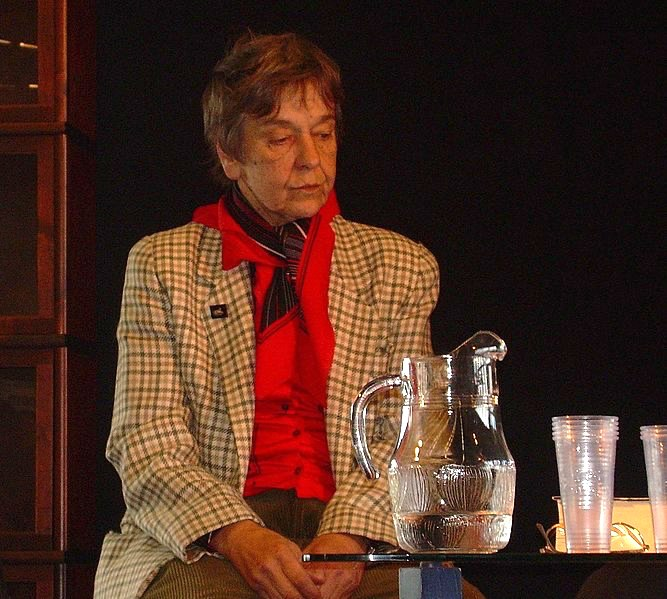
- Turkka at the Turku International Book Fair in 2008
- Born: 2 February 1939
- Died: 23 October 2021 (aged 82)
- Occupation: Poet
- Notable awards: Finlandia Prize (1987), Eino Leino Prize (2000)

Sirkka Turkka (2 February 1939 – 23 October 2021) was a Finnish poet and recipient of the Finlandia Prize in 1987 and the Eino Leino Prize in 2000.

== Works ==
- Huone avaruudessa (1973)
- Valaan vatsassa (1975)
- Minä se olen (1976)
- Yö aukeaa kuin vilja (1978)
- Mies joka rakasti vaimoaan liikaa (1979)
- Kaunis hallitsija (1981)
- Vaikka on kesä (1983)
- Teokset 1973–1983 (1985)
- Tule takaisin, pikku Sheba (1986), translated into English by Seija Paddon: Not You, Not the Rain (1991)
- Voiman ääni (1989), translated into English by Seija Paddon: The Sound of Strength (2000)
- Sielun veli (1993)
- Nousevan auringon talo (1997)
- Tulin tumman metsän läpi (1999)
- Niin kovaa se tuuli löi (2004)
- Runot 1973–2004 (2005)
