= Vilhelm Helander =

Finnish architect (1941–2025)

The House of the Estates in Helsinki, restored by Vilhelm Helander in 1985-93.

Arne Anders Vilhem Helander (8 February 1941 – 19 January 2025) was a Finnish architect and Professor of architectural history at Helsinki University of Technology, Espoo, Finland from 1986 until 2005, when he became professor emeritus. In November 2024 he was bestowed with the honorary title of Akateemikko (Academician).

== Life and career ==
Helander was born in Helsinki on 8 February 1941. His father was architect Aarne Helander, and his great uncle was architect and professor Armas Lindgren. He qualified as an architect in 1967, and completed a further Licentiate degree in architecture in 1972. He had been teaching in Helsinki University of Technology, in the position of teaching assistant to Professor Nils Erik Wickberg already since 1963, while still studying, and was an "acting professor" in 1968-69.

In addition to his teaching work, Helander also worked as an architect. He had his own architectural office since 1968, but was in partnership with architect Juha Leiviskä from 1978 until Leiviskä's death in 2023, their firm being called Vilhelm Helander, Juha Leiviskä arkkitehdit SAFA.

Helander first came to public prominence with the polemical book Kenen Helsinki? (Whose Helsinki?) (1970), written jointly with architect Mikael Sundman. This was a period when the building rights for many urban centres in Finland had been raised, allowing both owners and property developers to build larger buildings, the consequence of which was the destruction of much of the old urban fabric. In many cases, the historical facades were preserved and new buildings with denser areas were built behind them. Helander and Sundman's book was one of the first publications to bring the destruction of the historical Helsinki to public attention. One of the main examples was the development of the neoclassical Helsinki City Hall being vastly modified by architect Aarno Ruusuvuori. The book was awarded the prestigious Eino Leino Prize in 1971.

Helander went on to specialise in building conservation, both in teaching and in practice. Helander also wrote widely on the subject of the history of architecture, but especially Finnish architecture, notably the book Modern Architecture in Finland (1995).

Helander was a member of the Finnish Association of Architects, as well as a number of boards, including the Alvar Aalto Foundation (1997-2006), and the City of Helsinki city building inspection commission (1976–79, 1982–85).

Vilhelm Helander was married to Elisabeth Helander, Director of Community Initiatives and Innovative Actions of the Directorate-General for Regional Policy of the European Commission. They had two children, Max (b. 1964) and Johannes (b. 1966), both of whom are by profession technology engineers. Helander died on 19 January 2025, at the age of 83, and is buried in Kulosaari Cemetery in Helsinki.

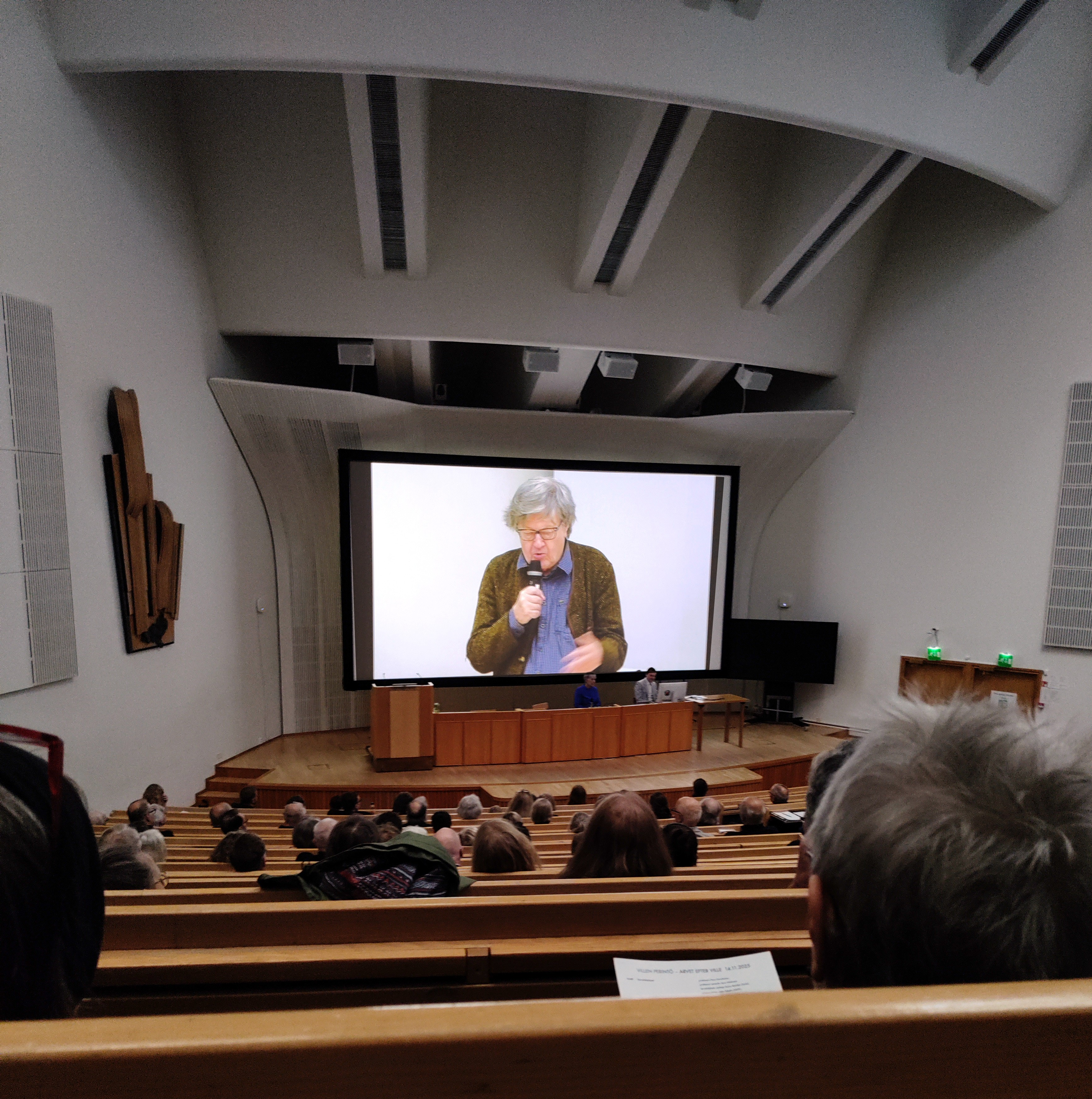
Video of Vilhelm Helander at the "Villen perintö" (Ville's Legacy) seminar, Aalto University, Otaniemi, 14.11.2025

A seminar in honour of Vilhelm Helander, "Villen perintä / Arvet efter Ville" [Ville's Legacy], was held in the main auditorium of Aalto University on November 14, 2025. The event, in the near-full 500-seat auditorium, featured presentations from almost 20 speakers, from former colleagues, employees and students.

== A select list of building conservation and conversion works by Vilhelm Helander ==
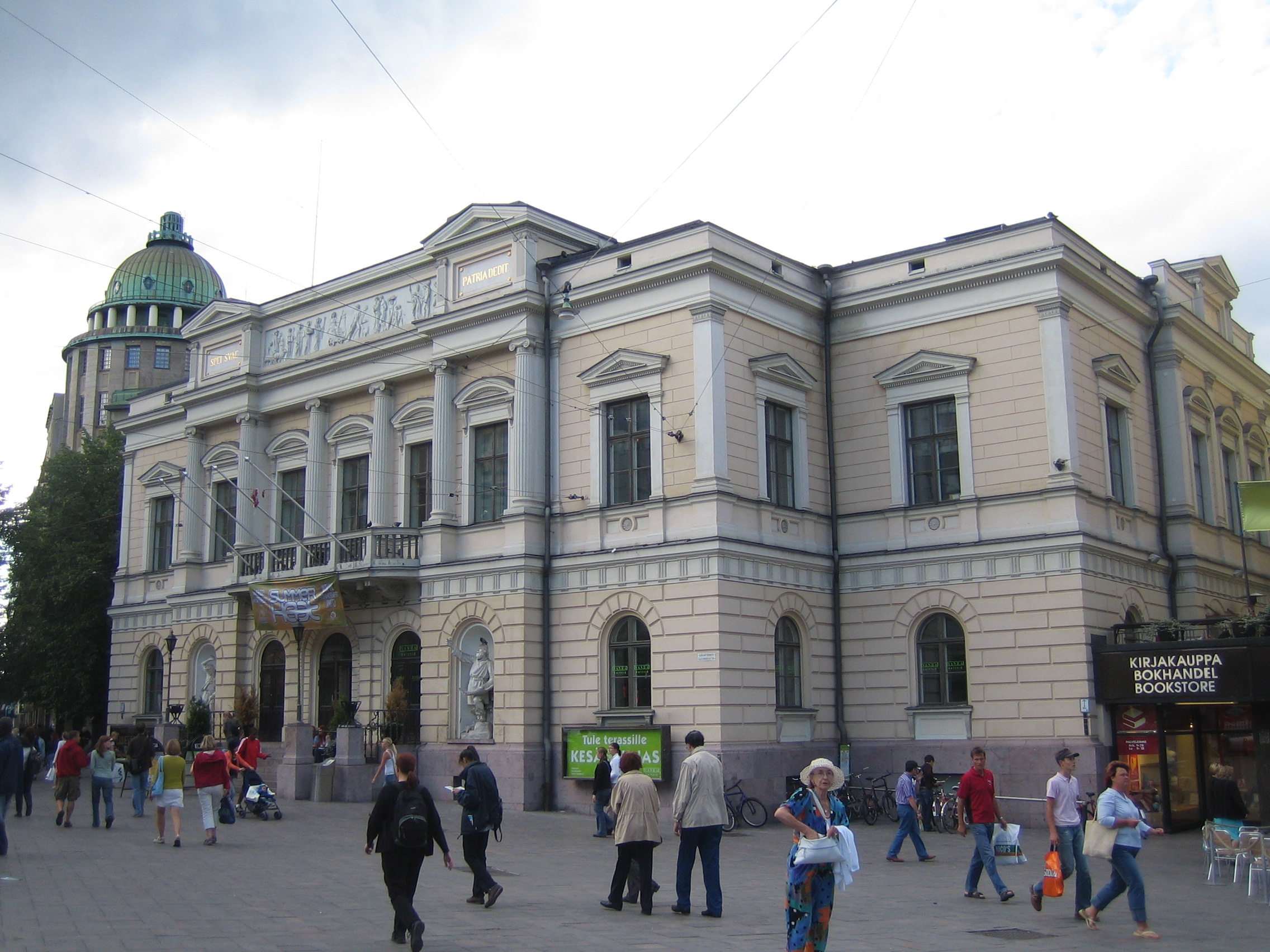
The Old Student House, restored by Helander and Leiviskä in 1978-80.

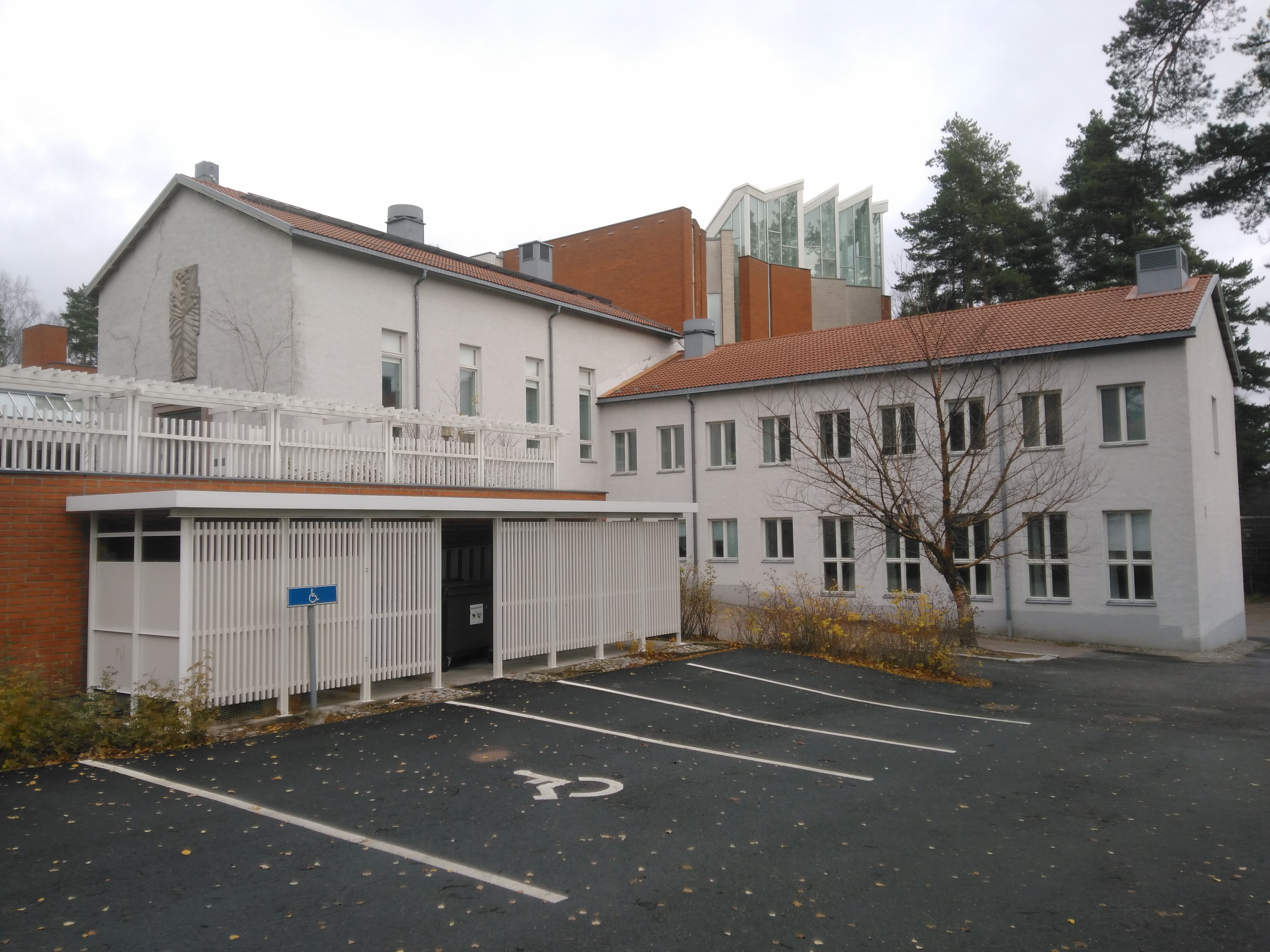
Good Shepherd Church, Helsinki, restoration and extension, 2002.

- Old Students' House, Helsinki (1978–80)
- Suomenlinna Fortress island, Helsinki (1977; 2005–09)
- School, kindergarten and clubhouse in Katajanokka, Helsinki (1980–85)
- Finnish National Museum, Helsinki (1993-2000, 2016-)
- Helsinki Cathedral, Helsinki (1995–99)
- House of the Estates, Helsinki (1985–93)
- Pori Town Hall (2000–08)
- Porvoo museums (2003–09)
- Good Shepherd Church, Pakila, Helsinki, restoration and extension (by Juha Leiviskä) (2002)

== Awards ==
Helander was awarded the European Gold Medal for the Preservation of Historical Monuments in 1998; and the Pro-Finlandia Medal in 1998. In November 2024 Helander followed Alvar Aalto, Reima Pietilä and Juha Leiviskä in becoming the architecture member of the Academy of Finland – thus bestowing on him the honorary title of Akateemikko (Academician).
