= Väinö Kirstinä =

Finnish writer

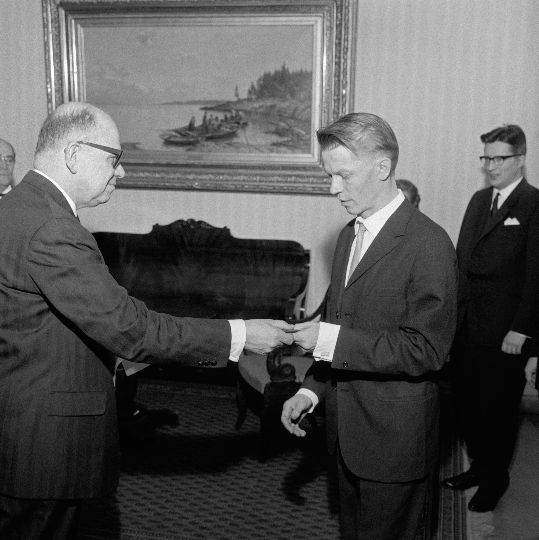
Väinö Kirstinä, 1964

Väinö Kirstinä (29 January 1936 – 23 September 2007) was a Finnish poet, journalist, translator, and critic. He worked for the Finnish Broadcasting Corporation. He was the recipient of the Eino Leino Prize in 1981.

Kirstinä was born in Tyrnävä and went to school in Oulu. He later moved to central Helsinki, which inspired some of his later work.

== Works ==
=== Poetry ===
- Lakeus (1961)
- Hitaat auringot (1963)
- Puhetta (Tammi, 1963)
- Pitkän tähtäyksen LSD-suunnitelma (Long-term LSD Plan) (Tammi, 1967)
- Säännöstelty eutanasia (Tammi, 1973)
- Elämä ilman sijaista (Tammi, 1977) 951-30-4218-9
- Hiljaisuudesta (Tammi, 1984) ISBN 951-30-6030-6
- Yötä, päivää (Tammi, 1986) ISBN 951-30-6354-2
- Vieroitusoireita (Tammi, 1994) ISBN 951-30-8978-9

=== Essays ===
- Kirjarovioiden valot (Tammi, 1977) 951-30-3268-X
- Puutarhassa (Tammi, 2003) ISBN 951-31-2684-6
- Kirjailijan tiet (Tammi, 2005) ISBN 951-31-3234-X

=== Other ===
- Talo maalla (Tammi, 1969; diary)
- Runo ja lukija (Weilin + Göös, 1971; textbook)
- O niin kuin omena (Runogalleria, 1997) ISBN 951-787-045-0
