= Mauri Ryömä =

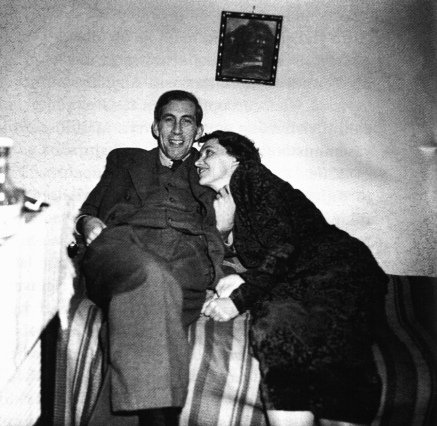
The Finnish deputy Mauri Ryömä and his wife writer Elvi Sinervo in 1950.

Mauri Ryömä (30 October 1911 in Helsinki – 28 November 1958) was a Finnish physician and politician.

== Biography ==
He was a member of the Parliament of Finland, representing the Social Democratic Party of Finland (SDP) from 1936 to 1937 and the Finnish People's Democratic League (SKDL) from 1945 until his death in 1958. He was imprisoned for political reasons from 1940 to 1944. After he was freed in 1944 as a result of the Moscow Armistice of 19 September 1944, he joined the SKDL and the Communist Party of Finland (SKP). He was the son of Hannes Ryömä and he was married to Elvi Sinervo. He died in a car accident four months after having been reelected in the 1958 Finnish parliamentary election.

== Sources ==
- Hanski, Jari: Ryömä, Mauri. Kansallisbiografia-verkkojulkaisu. Studia Biographica 4. Helsinki: Suomalaisen Kirjallisuuden Seura, 1997. (in Finnish)
