= Jukka Koskelainen =

Finnish poet (born 1961)

Jukka Koskelainen (born 1961) is a Finnish poet and recipient of the Eino Leino Prize in 1993 along with Jyrki Kiiskinen. They both edited the literary magazine Nuori Voima in the 1990s.
