= Olavi Paavolainen =

Finnish writer (1903-1964)

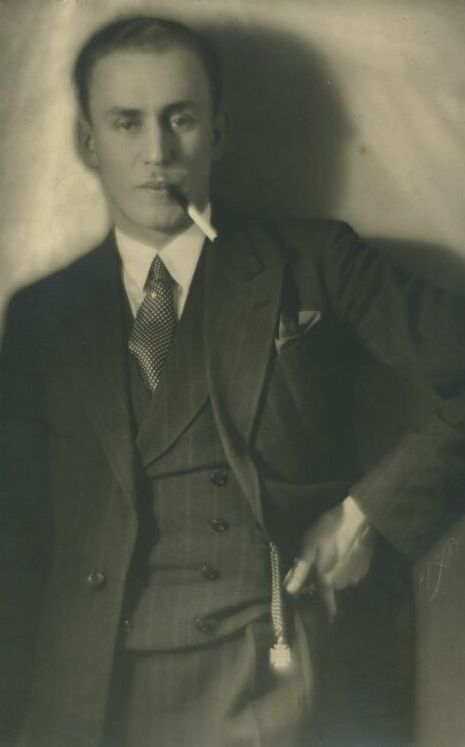
- Olavi Paavolainen in 1928
- Born: 17 September 1903; Kivennapa, Grand Duchy of Finland
- Died: 19 July 1964 (aged 60); Helsinki, Finland
- Occupations: writer, poet, essayist
- Years active: 1919–1964

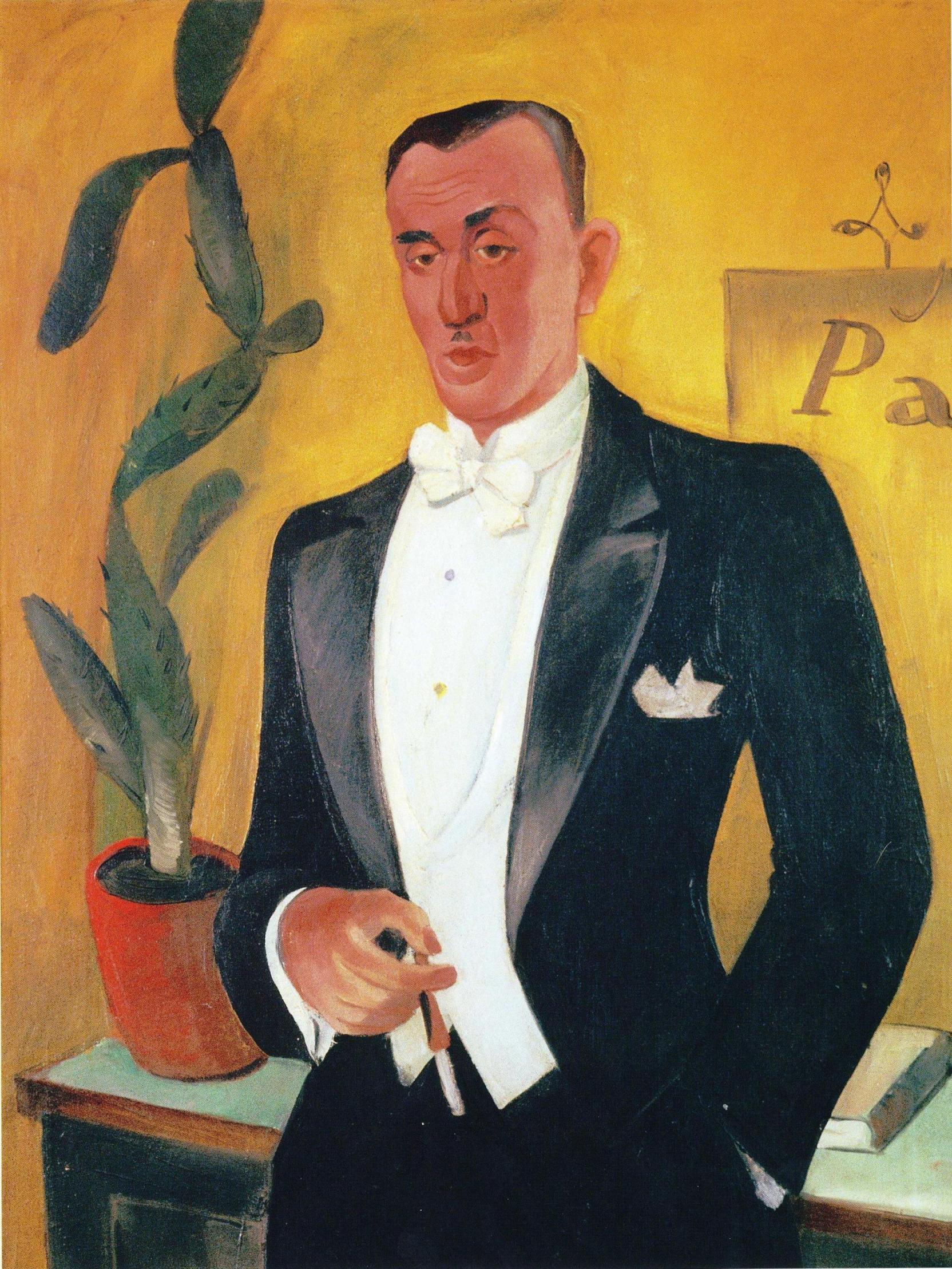
Väinö Kunnas, Olavi Paavolainen, 1928

Olavi Paavolainen (17 September 1903 – 19 July 1964) was a Finnish writer, essayist and poet. He was one of the prominent figures of the literary group Tulenkantajat (″The Flame Bearers″), and one of the most influential Finnish writers of the inter-war period. Paavolainen started his poetry career in the literary magazine Nuori Voima.

Paavolainen was interested in Fascism and National Socialism, but after the World War II he turned to the political left. Paavolainen's notable works include the 1936 travel report Kolmannen valtakunnan vieraana (″A Guest of the Third Reich″) and the 1946 Synkkä yksinpuhelu (″A Gloomy Soliloquy″), based on his war diaries. On the basis of the latter book, an adaptation of the Sign of the Beast was made in 1981, directed by Jaakko Pakkasvirta.

Paavolainen was bisexual. In the 1930s, he had a long relationship with the writer Helvi Hämäläinen. In 1945–1953, Paavolainen was married to the actress Sirkka-Liisa Virtamo. After the divorce he was in a relationship with the communist leader Hertta Kuusinen.

== Awards ==
- Eino Leino Prize 1960

== Works ==
- Nuoret runoilijat, 1924 (anthology)
- Valtatiet, 1928 (with Mika Waltari)
- Nykyaikaa etsimässä, 1929
- Keulakuvat, 1932
- Suursiivous eli kirjallisessa lastenkamarissa, 1932
- Kolmannen valtakunnan vieraana, 1936
- Lähtö ja loitsu, 1937
- Risti ja hakaristi, 1938
- Synkkä yksinpuhelu, 1946
