= Jyrki Kiiskinen =

Finnish poet (born 1963)

Jyrki Kiiskinen (born 1963) is a Finnish poet and recipient of the Eino Leino Prize in 1993 along with Jukka Koskelainen. They both edited the literary magazine Nuori Voima in the 1990s.
