= Juha Mannerkorpi =

Finnish writer

Juha Mannerkorpi (1915, Ashtabula, Ohio - 1980) was a Finnish writer and recipient of the Eino Leino Prize in 1961.
