= Ilpo Tiihonen =

Finnish poet (1950–2021)

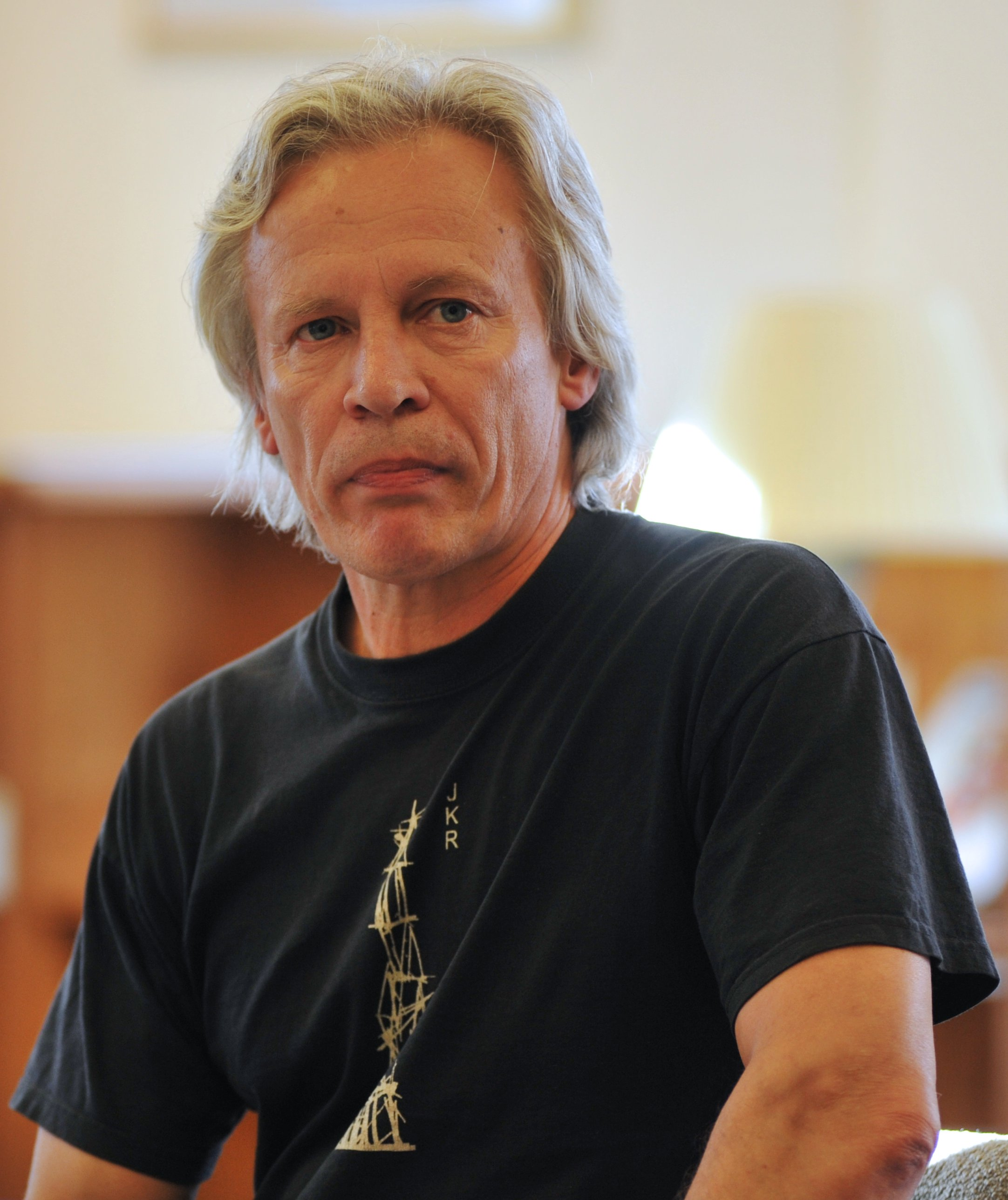

Ilpo Tiihonen (1 September 1950 – 8 June 2021) was a Finnish writer and recipient of the Eino Leino Prize in 1991. He was born in Kuopio and died, aged 70, in Ylöjärvi.
