= Antti Hyry =

Finnish writer

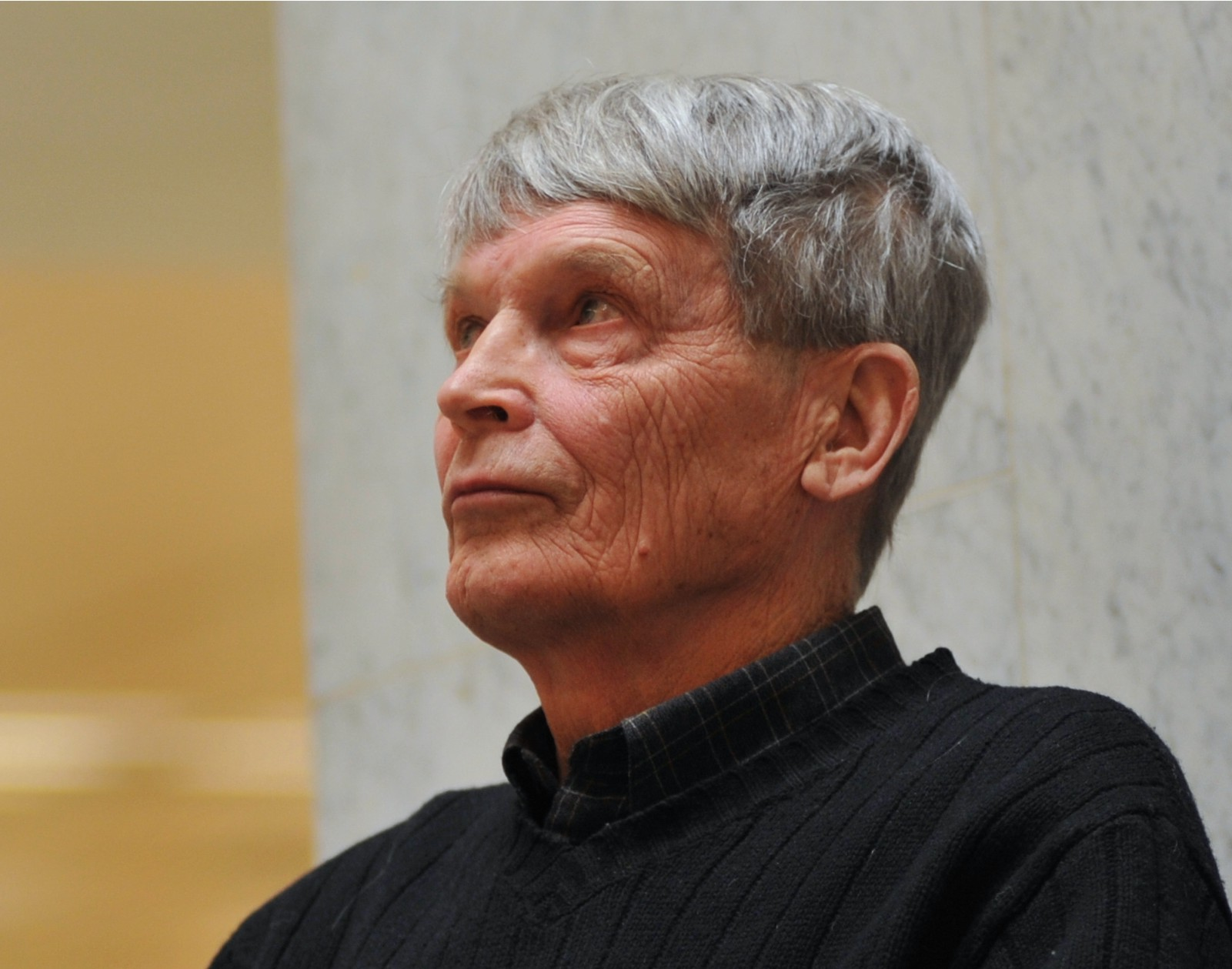
Antti Hyry in 2010

Antti Kalevi Hyry (20 October 1931 in Kuivaniemi – 4 June 2016 in Espoo) was a Finnish writer and recipient of the Eino Leino Prize in 2005. In 2009 his book Uuni (Oven) won the Finlandia Prize, Finland's premier prize for literature. It details a man's reflections as he collects cement and bricks to build an oven for his home. Antti Hyry was married to Maija Hyry.
