= Risto Kappet =

Estonian esport competitor

Risto Kappet (born 12 May 1994) is an Estonian sim racing driver.

== Career ==
Kappet was born in Tallinn. He is part of R8G Esports, founded by ex Formula One driver Romain Grosjean. He is currently actively competing in the national sim racing championships organized by Eesti Virtuaalne Autospordi Liit & other major esports competitions mainly on the rFactor 2 platform.

In 2019, he came in second place in the 2019 RF2 World’s Fastest Gamer competition and achieved second place in the ESL MAPFRE Racing Series. He is the winner of the RaceRoom Endurance Team Challenge 2019.

In March 2020, Kappet won the BMW M2 CS Racing Cup round on the rFactor 2 platform. In June 2020, he won his second race of the series.

In 2020, he joined R8G Esports and achieved 3rd place in the 24 Hours of Le Mans Virtual 24h in GTE class, becoming the first Estonian to take part in the virtual version of the official 24-hour endurance race. He also broke into the top ten Estonian e-athletes with the largest service in 2020.

In 2021, competed in Formula E: Accelerate championship and achieved the first national sim racing title in Estonia.
