= Mirjam Polkunen =

Finnish writer, literature researcher, translator and dramatist (1926–2012)

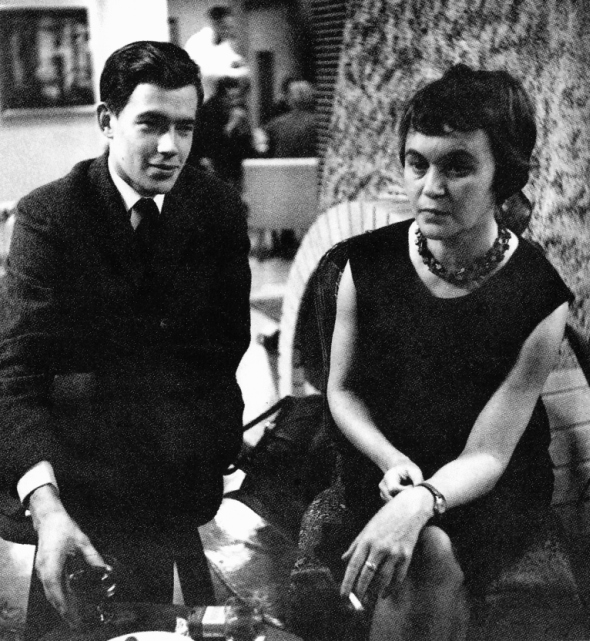
Tarkka-Polkunen-1961

Maire Mirjam Polkunen (2 March 1926 – 22 June 2012) was a Finnish writer, literature researcher, translator and dramatist. Among other awards, she won the Eino Leino Prize in 1969. Her Finnish rendering of Zeno's Conscience was awarded with the Mikael Agricola Prize in 1972.
