= Kai Nieminen =

Finnish writer

Kai Tapani Nieminen (born 11 May 1950 in Helsinki) is a Finnish writer and recipient of the Eino Leino Prize in 1999. He is also a renowned translator of Japanese literature.
