= Helvi Juvonen =

Finnish writer

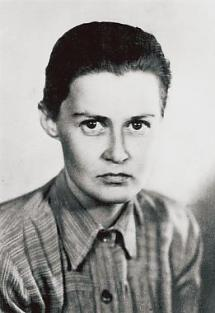
Helvi Juvonen, 1940s

Helvi Juvonen (5 November 1919, Iisalmi, Northern Savonia – 1 October 1959) was a Finnish poet and recipient of the Eino Leino Prize in 1957.

She is buried in the Hietaniemi Cemetery in Helsinki.
