= J. K. Ihalainen =

Finnish poet

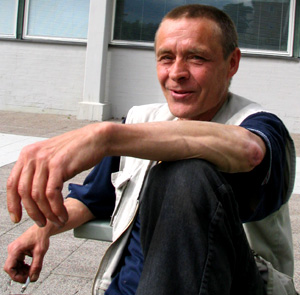
J. K. Ihalainen

J. K. Ihalainen (born 6 January 1957 in Tampere) is a Finnish poet and recipient of the Eino Leino Prize in 2010.
