= Raoul Palmgren =

Finnish writer (1912–1995)

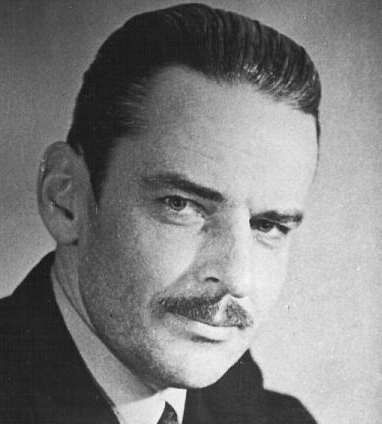
Raoul Palmgren.

Raoul Palmgren (12 January 1912, Karis — 10 March 1995, Tampere) was a Finnish writer, literary scholar, critic, professor and recipient of the Eino Leino Prize in 1972. He was also a literature scholar and a professor at University of Oulu in 1968–1976.

== Biography ==
=== Early years and education ===
Palmgren was the son of the lensmann Herman Sigurd Olof Palmgren and Hildur Maria Forsman. He spent a large part of his childhood and youth in northern Häme, where his father worked. On his father's side, Palmgren was of Finland-Swedish origin, while his mother came from a Häme crofter family.

Palmgren attended school in Haapamäki for a few years, then a few years at the Normal Lyceum of Helsinki and then continued at Tampereen lyseon lukio, where he graduated from in 1931. He then began studies in aesthetics and history at the University of Helsinki. It was during his studies that Palmgren came into contact with and began to associate with several left-wing intellectual circles in Helsinki, including the Tulenkantajat. Palmgren had already been writing poetry for some time, but during his studies he also began to write cultural-political articles, polemical posts and literature reviews, which were mainly published in the magazine Tulenkantajat.

In May 1937, Palmgren graduated with a Bachelor of Arts. In the same year, he published his first independent work, his thesis in history, Vallankumous ja vastavallankumous Saksassa (Revolution and Counter-Revolution in Germany). Palmgren also joined the Social Democratic Party during this time, but in the spring of 1937 he was expelled from the party for his partly opposing views.

Palmgren participated in the Winter War as a soldier but went underground when the Continuation War broke out. At the end of 1941 he was found out and sentenced to four and a half years in a penal colony for desertion. After the war, Palmgren joined the Finnish Communist Party.

=== Career after the war ===
Palmgren worked as literary director at the publishing house Kansankulttuuri and then as culture editor at Vapaa Sana, where he was appointed editor-in-chief in June 1945. In 1946 Palmgren joined the Finnish People's Democratic League (SKDL). He broke with the Communist Party in 1952 and was fired from Vapaa Sana a few months later.

He then worked as a freelance journalist for a few years. In 1953 he published his autobiographical novel 30-luvun kuvat. In 1957 Palmgren moved to Kemi to work as a librarian. In 1965 he defended his thesis on the theme of workers' and proletarian literature at the University of Helsinki. He then wrote Joukkosydän (Mass Heart), which was published a year later, a history of the fiction of the old workers' movement. Joukkosydän and the doctoral thesis were the result of extensive research that he had begun in the 1930s. Palmgren found it difficult to obtain more qualified positions, as universities refused to hire him due to his past as a known leftist. However, after working for a year as a city librarian in Vaasa, he became a professor of literature at the University of Oulu in 1968.

== Significance and legacy ==
During the 1930s, Palmgren was considered by many to be one of the leading left-wing critics. Among others, Mika Waltari wrote in Ilon ja aatteen vudet (The Year of Joy and Ideology) that Palmgren was the leading left-wing critic and that even his opponents closely followed his reviews. Palmgren was also a pioneer in research into Finnish workers' literature.

Palmgren was considered the leading cultural politician and cultural theorist of the SKDL for a long time. During his time in Vapaa Sana, he produced over 2,000 articles and contributed to other left-wing newspapers with extensive articles and reviews. He also lectured on the radio and gave speeches and lectures at various events within the SKP and SKDL. Palmgren's articles were considered to be comprehensive and packed with facts. One of Palmgren's most notable works are his causeries, which he published under the name "Pancho Villa", later under the pseudonym "Hapan."

== Private life ==
Palmgren was married three times: 1936–1953 to the editor Irja Margareta Laurikainen, 1953–1979 to the actress and director Ilmi Aino Parkkari and from 1988 to Marja-Leena Vainionpää.

== Bibliography ==
- Vallankumous ja vastavallankumous Saksassa (1937)
- Venäläinen romaaniperinne ja Neuvostoliiton kirjallisuus (1940)
- Sirola ja sivistyneistö, SKP taistelujen tiellä. Vuosikirja IV (1948)
- Suuri linja. Arwidssonista vallankumouksellisiin sosialisteihin (1948, second edition 1976)
- Hapanta (1953, under the pseudonym Hapan)
- 30-luvun kuvat (1953, under the pseudonym R. Palomeri)
- Marxilaisen estetiikan kaksitasoisuus (1953, Swedish translation: Den dubbelbottnade marxistiska estetiken, published the same year)
- Toivon ja pelon utopiat (1963)
- Työläiskirjallisuus (Proletaarikirjallisuus). Kirjallisuus- ja aatehistoriallinen käsiteselvittely (1965)
- Joukkosydän. Vanhan työväenliikkeemme kaunokirjallisuus I−II (1966)
- Maksim Gorki. Elämä ja teokset (1978)
