= Helvi Hämäläinen =

Finnish author

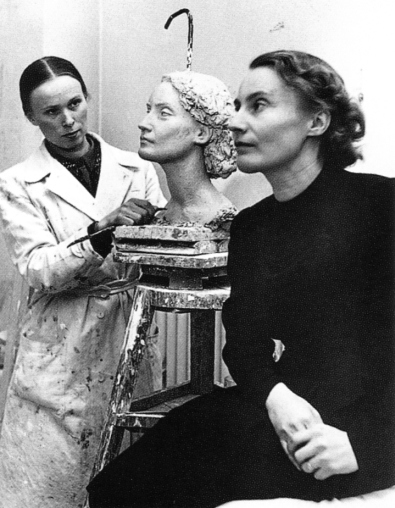
The Finnish sculptor Essi Renvall (1911–1979) creating a bust of the writer Helvi Hämäläinen (1907–1998).

Helvi Hämäläinen (16 June 1907 – 17 January 1998) was a Finnish writer who published dozens of books of prose and poetry during her six decade writing career.

== Biography ==
Helvi Heleena Hämäläinen was born in Hamina, 16 June 1907. She moved to Helsinki with her parents Aaro and Iida Hämäläinen while still a pre-schooler.

Hämäläinen's first published novel, Hyväntekijä (The Benefactor) appeared in 1930, but her breakthrough came five years later with her feminist depiction of the working-class, Katuojan vettä (Water in a Gutter). Hämäläinen's best-known book, Säädyllinen murhenäytelmä (A Decent Tragedy), appeared in 1941. A roman à clef, it caused a great sensation: readers were able to identify several notable cultural personalities of the day, Hämäläinen's former lover Olavi Paavolainen among them. Hämäläinen's first novel, a modernist first-person text Kaunis sielu (The Beautiful Soul) was written already in the winter of 1927–28, but it wasn't published until 2001, assumedly because of its portrayal of same-sex desire.

In 1987, after two decades out of the spotlight, Hämäläinen returned to the public eye when her book of poems, Sukupolveni unta (Dreams of My Generation), won the Finlandia Prize.

Hämäläinen died at the age of 90 on 17 January 1998. She is buried in the Orthodox cemetery of Helsinki.

== Awards ==
She was awarded the Pro Finlandia Medal in 1959.
