= Risto Rasa =

Finnish poet (born 1954)

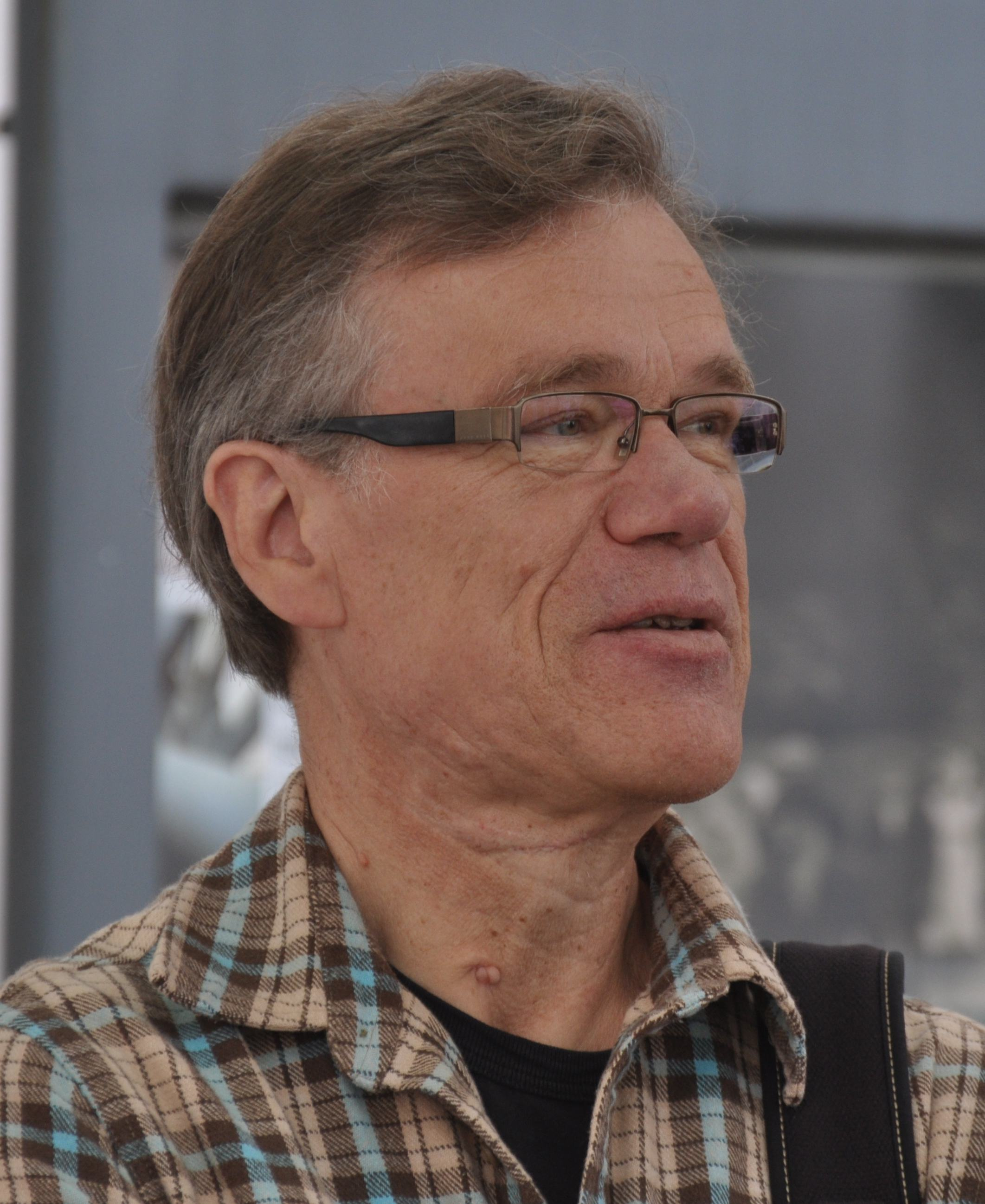
Risto Rasa in 2012.

Risto Olavi Rasa (born 29 April 1954 in Helsinki) is a Finnish poet. He writes short nature poems. He is a librarian in Somero.

== Poem books ==
- Metsän seinä on vain vihreä ovi ("The wall of the forest is only a green door") (1971)
- Kulkurivarpunen ("The vagabond sparrow") (1973)
- Hiljaa, nyt se laulaa ("Be quiet! Now it sings") (1974)
- Kaksi seppää ("Two smiths") (1976)
- Rantatiellä ("On the shore way") (1980)
- Laulu ennen muuttomatkaa ("The song before the migratory") (poems 1971–1980 [1982])
- Taivasalla ("In the open air") (1987)
- Tuhat purjetta ("Thousand sails") (poems 1971–1990 [1992])
