= Risto Ahti =

Finnish writer

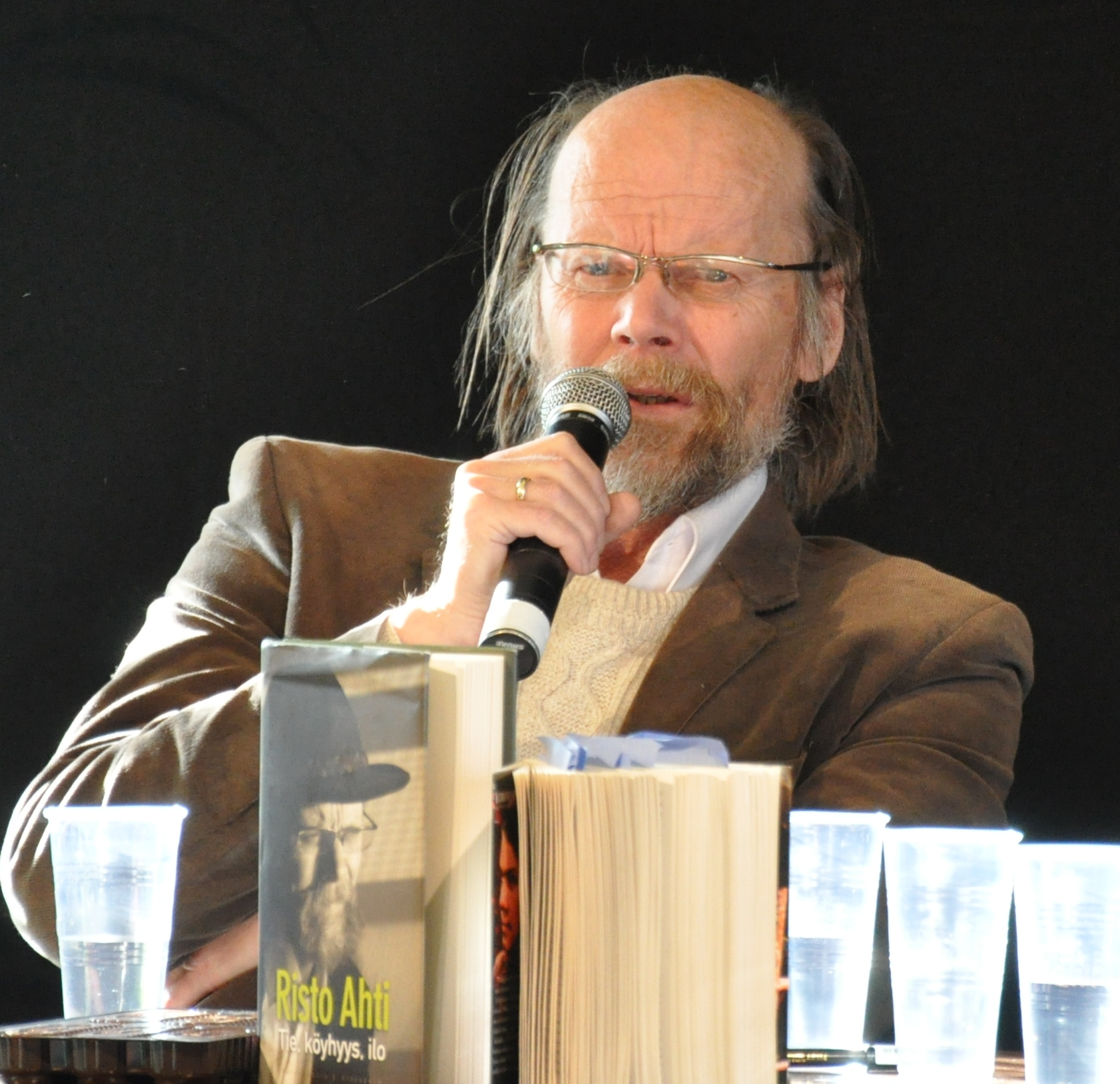
- Born: Risto Tapani Ahti; 27 August 1943 (age 82) Lahti, Finland
- Occupation: Poet, writer, teacher
- Language: Finnish
- Citizenship: Finnish
- Notable awards: Eino Leino Prize 1994, Runeberg Prize 2002, Pro Finlandia Medal 2003

Risto Ahti (born 27 August 1943 in Lahti) is a Finnish writer and recipient of the Eino Leino Prize in 1994.

== Bibliography ==
- Talvi on harha, 1967
- Runoja, 1968
- Unilaulu, 1972
- Katson silmiin lasta, 1974
- Oli kerran kultakettu, 1975
- On myös unia, 1977
- Aurinkotanssi, 1978
- Lintujen planeetta, 1979
- Ja niin rakentuu jokin silta, 1981
- Narkissos talvella, 1982
- Loistava yksinäisyys, 1984
- Läsnäolon ikävä, 1987
- Laki, 1989
- Valitse minut, 1992
- Pieni käsikirja, 1993
- Iloinen laulu Eevasta ja Aatamista, 1995
- Iloiset harhaopit.Runoja ja merkintöjä, 1998
- Ilon ääriviivat. Valitut runot 1967–1998, 1999
- Aatamin muistiinpanot, 2000
- William Blake & vimmainen genius, 2001
- Vain tahallaan voi rakastaa. Runoja ja merkintöjä, 2001
- Kukko tunkiolla, 2002
- Runoaapinen. Aistisen, tunteellisen ja älyllisen kirjoittamisen alkeet, 2002
- Sudet ja lampaat (runoja ja huomautuksia), 2003
- Oikkuja ja totuuksia. Runoja ja huomautuksia, 2005
- Runoaapinen. 2, Sanaluvun koetus, 2005
- Kriittinen minä, 2006
- Leikkilauluja!, 2006
- Ei kukaan, 2007
- Puutarhajuhlat vanhassa piispan huvilassa (kanssapuheita), 2008
- Ne kymmenen käskyä, 2008
- Tie, köyhyys, ilo, 2009
- Täsmällinen selvitys ei mistään (runoelma), 2009
- Neron omaelämäkerta, 2010

== In English ==
- Narcissus in winter, 1994 ISBN 1873918089
