= List of polytechnics in Finland =

A university of applied sciences (UAS), formerly translated into English as a polytechnic, is a Finnish higher education institution with a professional and practical orientation. There are 24 different universities of applied sciences across the country. All universities of applied sciences operate under the jurisdiction of the Finnish Ministry of Education and Culture except for the Högskolan på Åland and the Police University College, which are administered by the Government of Åland and Ministry of Interior respectively.

Full Name	Abbr. (local)	Location(s) as of January 1, 2014	Established	Students (2009)	Notes
Arcada University of Applied Sciences	Arcada	Helsinki	1996 (prov.), 1998	2 234	Education in Swedish, with a few English programmes
Centria University of Applied Sciences	Centria	Kokkola, Ylivieska, Jakobstad, Haapajärvi	1995	3 098	Education in Finnish, Swedish and English
Diaconia University of Applied Sciences	Diak	Helsinki, Kauniainen, Turku, Oulu, Pieksämäki, Järvenpää, Pori	1996	3 043	
HAAGA-HELIA University of Applied Sciences	HAAGA-HELIA	Helsinki, Porvoo, Heinola	2007	9 180	Merger by Haaga and Helia (see defunct)
HAMK University of Applied Sciences	HAMK	Hämeenlinna, Forssa, Riihimäki, Tammela, Hattula, Valkeakoski		6 325	
Humak University of Applied Sciences	HUMAK	Helsinki, Kuopio, Joensuu, Haapavesi, Lohja, Nurmijärvi, Tornio, Äänekoski, Joutseno, Jyväskylä, Kauniainen, Turku	1998 (prov.), 2000	1 374	
JAMK University of Applied Sciences	JAMK	Jyväskylä, Saarijärvi	1994	6 097	
Kajaani University of Applied Sciences	KAMK	Kajaani	1992 (prov.), 1996	1 989	
Karelia University of Applied Sciences	Karelia (formerly PKAMK)	Joensuu	1992	3 802	
LAB University of Applied Sciences	LAB	Lahti, Lappeenranta	2020	8 737	Merger of Lahti University of Applied Sciences and Saimaa University of Applied Sciences.
Lapland University of Applied Sciences	Lapin AMK	Kemi, Tornio, Rovaniemi	2014	5 618	Merger of Kemi-Tornio and Rovaniemi, Northernmost higher education institution in the European Union
Laurea University of Applied Sciences	Laurea	Espoo, Vantaa, Lohja, Porvoo, Kerava, Hyvinkää	1992	9 900	Bachelor's and master's degrees in English and Finnish languages.
Metropolia University of Applied Sciences	Metropolia	Helsinki, Espoo, Vantaa	2008	13 838	Merger by EVTEK and Stadia (see defunct)
Novia University of Applied Sciences	Novia	Vaasa, Espoo, Ekenäs, Turku, Nykarleby, Jakobstad	2008	3 511	Merger by Swedish Polytechnic and Sydväst (see defunct), education in Swedish
Oulu University of Applied Sciences	OAMK	Oulu, Oulainen, Raahe	1992 (prov.), 1996	7 282	
Police University College	Polamk	Tampere (before 1.1.2008, Espoo)	1998	~1 000	Administered by the Ministry of the Interior
Satakunta University of Applied Sciences	SAMK	Pori, Harjavalta, Huittinen, Kankaanpää, Rauma	1997	5 556	
Savonia University of Applied Sciences	Savonia	Kuopio, Iisalmi, Varkaus	1992 (prov.), 1998	6 423	
Seinäjoki University of Applied Sciences	SeAMK	Seinäjoki, Ilmajoki, Kurikka, Kauhajoki, Kauhava, Ähtäri	1992 (prov.), 1995	4 533	
South-Eastern Finland University of Applied Sciences	Xamk	Mikkeli, Kouvola, Savonlinna, Kotka	2017	9 300	Merger of Mikkeli and Kymenlaakso
Tampere University of Applied Sciences	TAMK	Tampere, Ikaalinen, Mänttä-Vilppula, Virrat	1996	9 284 (incl. PIRAMK)	2010-01-01 Tampereen ammattikorkeakoulu merged into Pirkanmaan ammattikorkeakoulu Oy; conversely name TAMK persisted and PIRAMK ceased
Turku University of Applied Sciences	Turun AMK	Turku, Loimaa, Salo, Uusikaupunki	1992	8 891	
Vaasa University of Applied Sciences	VAMK	Vaasa	1996	3 354	Education in Finnish, Swedish and English
Åland University of Applied Sciences	HÅ	Mariehamn, Åland	1997 (prov.), 2003	~400	Administered by the Government of Åland, education in Swedish

== Defunct ==
- EVTEK University of Applied Sciences (EVTEK) to form Metropolia 2008-08-01
- HAAGA University of Applied Sciences (HAAGA) to form Haaga-Helia 2007-01-01
- Helsinki Business Polytechnic (Helia) to form Haaga-Helia 2007-01-01
- Helsinki Polytechnic Stadia (Stadia) to form Metropolia 2008-08-01
- Pirkanmaa University of Applied Sciences (PIRAMK) to form TAMK 2010-01-01
- Swedish Polytechnic (SYH) to form Novia 2008-08-01
- Sydväst Polytechnic (Sydväst) to form Novia 2008-08-01
- Kemi-Tornio University of Applied Sciences (KTAMK) to form Lapin AMK 2014-01-01
- Rovaniemi University of Applied Sciences (RAMK) to form Lapin AMK 2014-01-01
- Kymenlaakso University of Applied Sciences (KyAMK) to form XAMK 2017-01-01
- Mikkeli University of Applied Sciences (MAMK) to form XAMK 2017-01-01
- Lahti University of Applied Sciences (LAMK) to form LAB 2020-01-01
- Saimaa University of Applied Sciences (Saimaan AMK) to form LAB 2020-01-01

== See also ==
- Ammattikorkeakoulu
- Education in Finland
- List of universities in Finland
- List of colleges and universities
- List of colleges and universities by country
- List of schools in Finland
