= Niels Edward Liljenberg =

Swedish-born American architect

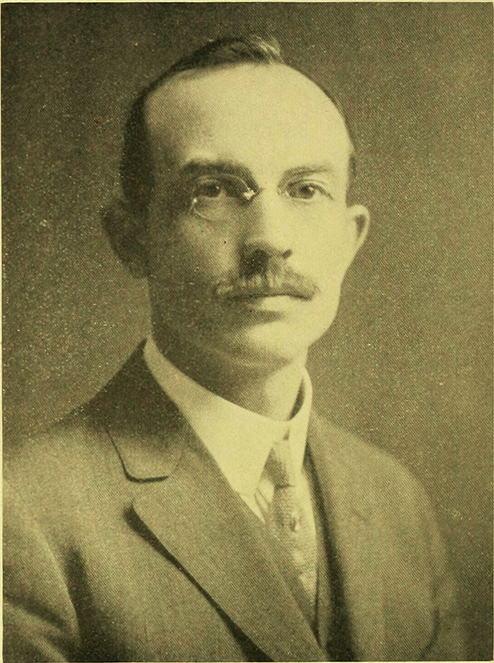
- Born: February 10, 1869; Höör Municipality, Skåne, Sweden
- Died: October 8, 1952 (aged 83); La Mesa, California, US
- Education: Swedish Polytechnic
- Occupation: Architect
- Spouse: Anna Sofia Sundh
- Children: 3

Niels or Nils Edward Liljenberg (February 10, 1869 – October 8, 1952) was an architect in early 20th century Utah.

== Biography ==
Nils Liljenberg was born at Höör Municipality in Skåne, Sweden. He received his architectural degree in 1888 at Swedish Polytechnic (Swedish: Svenska yrkeshögskolan) . After working in New York City and on projects designing army barracks throughout Europe, he moved to Utah in 1902. He became licensed to work in Utah as an architect in 1904 and began the firm Erskine & Liljenberg (1873–1956). He was the architect for the Jordan School District where many of his works were completed including Jordan High School, Taylorsville, Forrest Dale, and Bonneview Elementary schools. He also designed various civic buildings and residences. Various works by Liljenberg are listed on the National Register of Historic Places.

== Personal life ==
Niels married Anna Sofia Sundh (1873-1956) and together they had three children. Sometime around 1920, at seemingly the height of his career in Utah, Liljenberg and his family moved to El Cajon, California. It is uncertain if he continued to work as an architect in California prior to his death in La Mesa on October 8, 1952.

== Architectural works on the National Register of Historic Places ==
- Beaver Opera House - 1909 (designed with Emil Maeser)
- Alpine Stake Tabernacle- 1909 (designed with Emil Maeser)
- Draper Park School
- Murray LDS Second Ward Meetinghouse

=== Other buildings ===
- Jordan High School (1914; razed 1996) *formerly NRHP listed
- Ferry Hall - Westminster College (1908; razed 1987)
- Eagle Fraternity Building - 404 S. West Temple, SLC (1905-currently Caffè Molise)
- Salt Lake City YMCA (1904; razed)

== Gallery ==
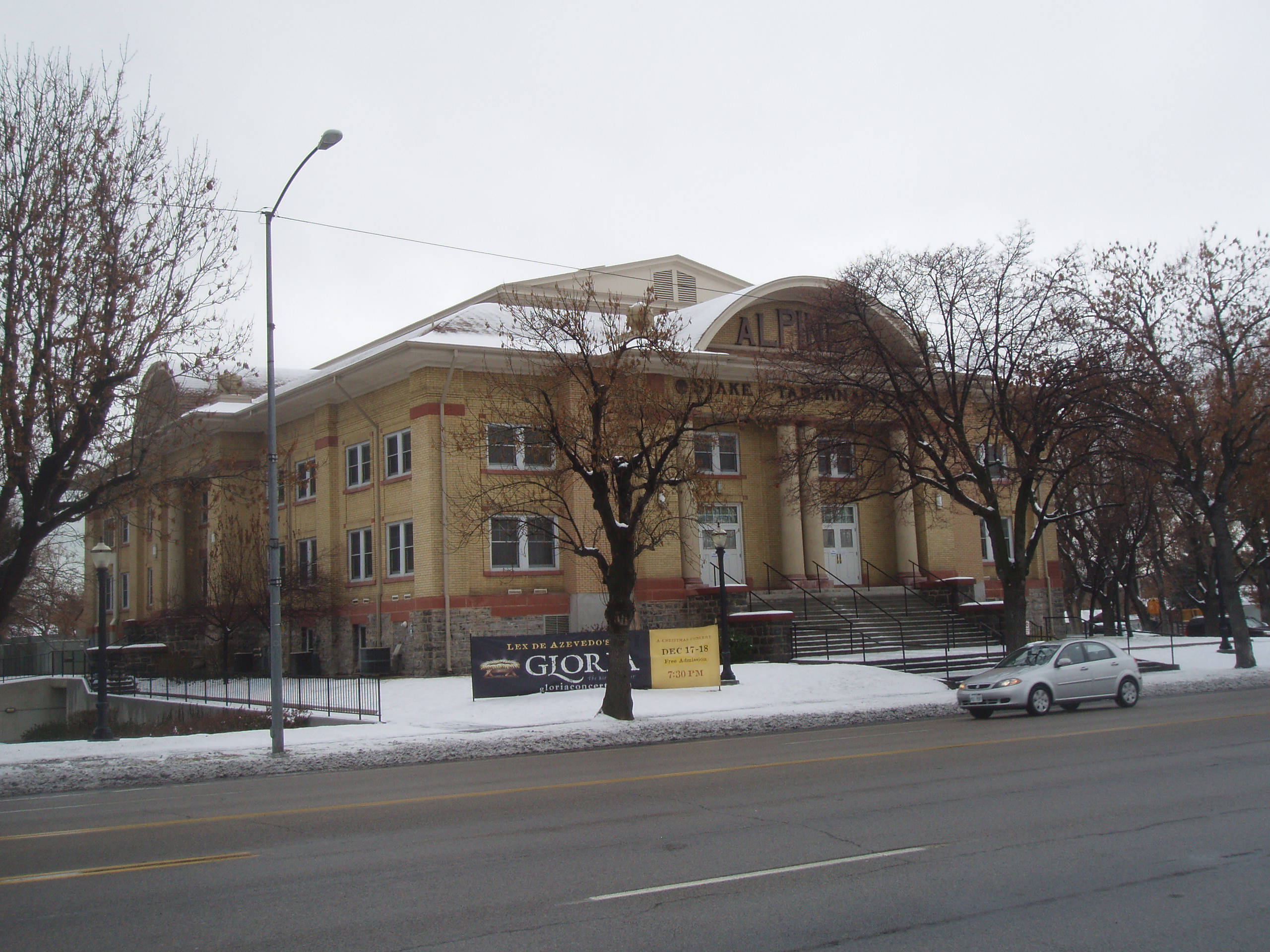
Alpine Stake Tabernacle-American Fork Historic District (1914)

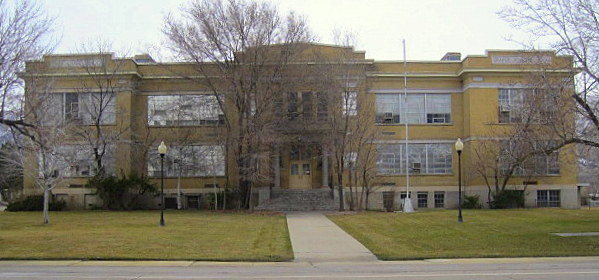
Draper Park School (1912)

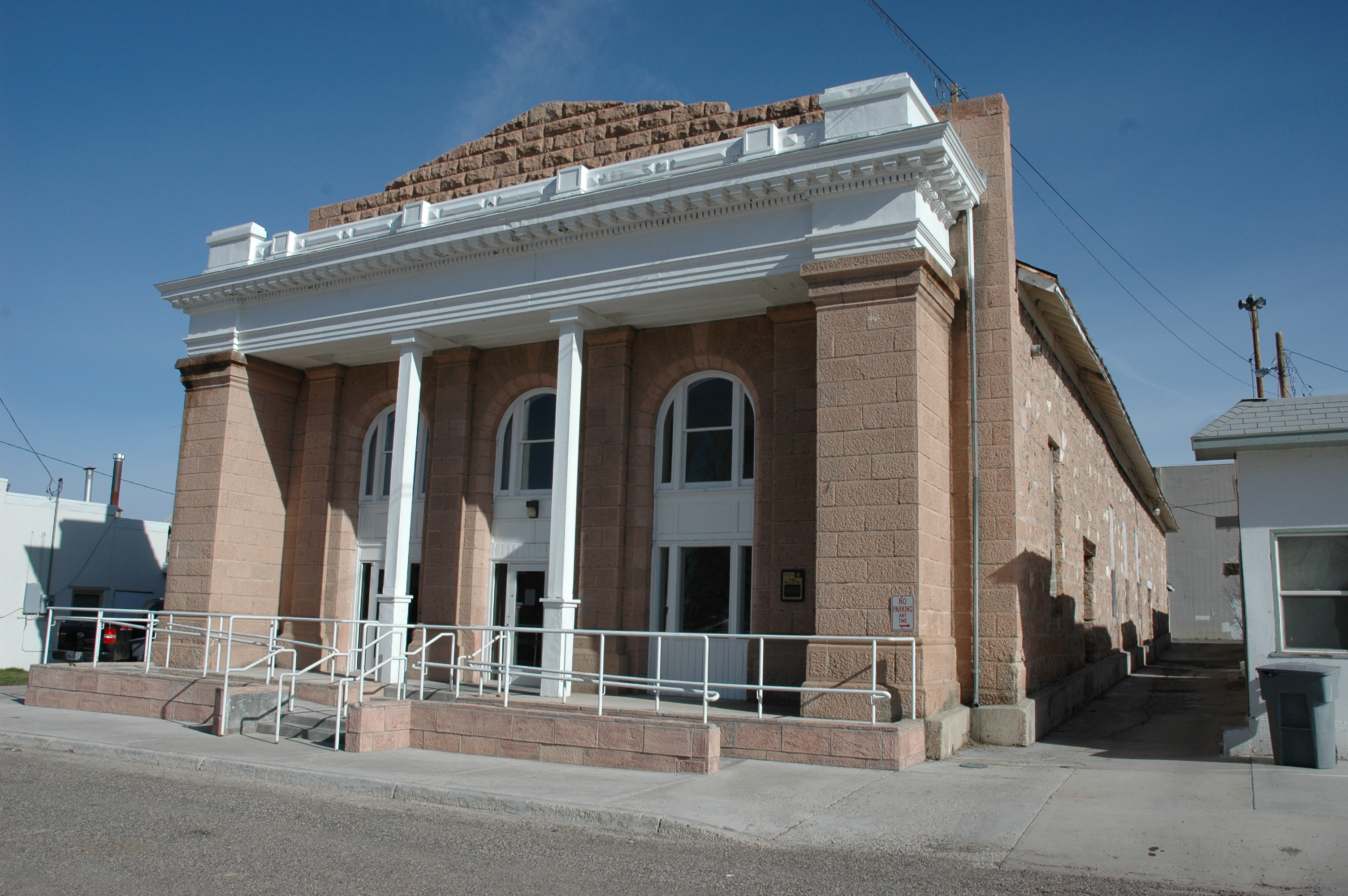
Beaver Opera House (1909)

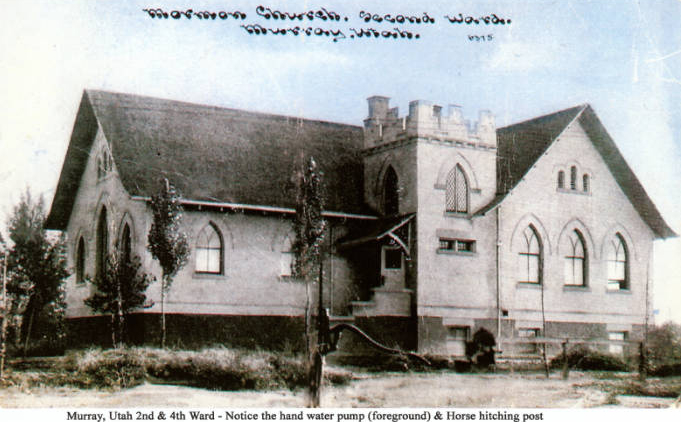
Murray LDS Second Ward Meetinghouse (1909)
