= Battle of Tornio (1918) =

1918 battle of the Finnish Civil War

- Part of Finnish Civil War
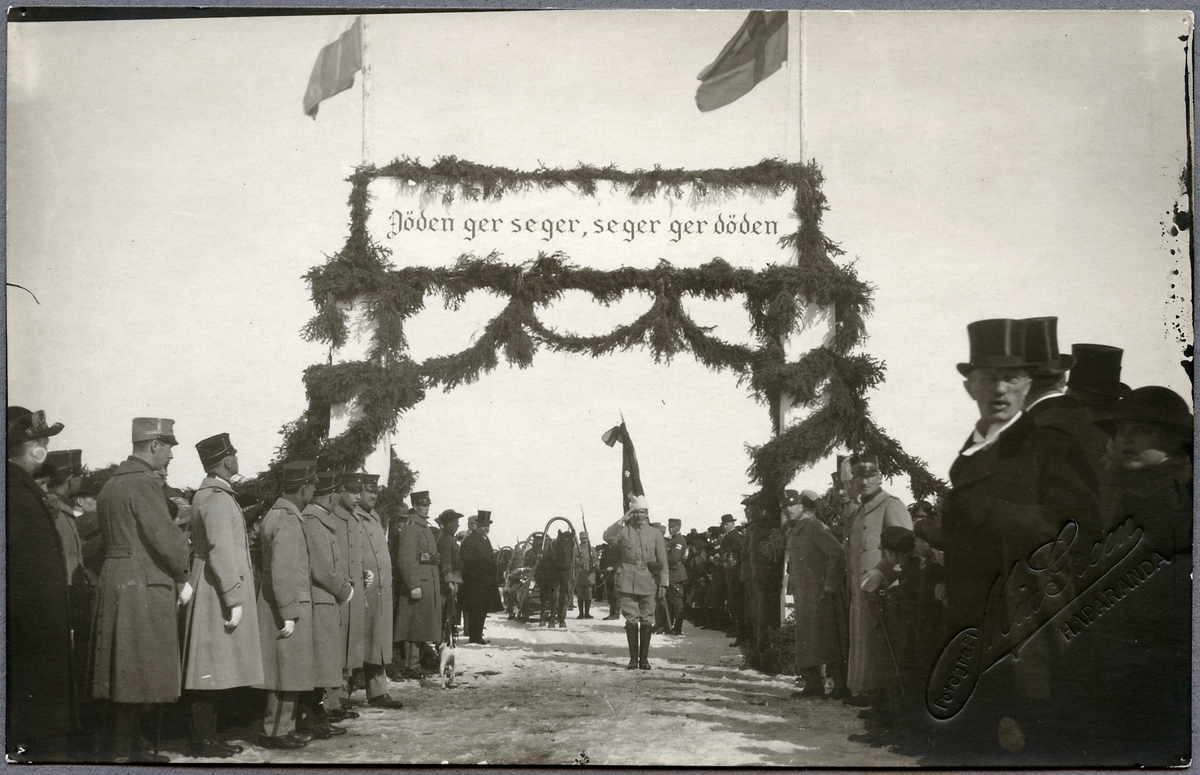
- Fallen Swedish Soldiers in Tornio
Date	6 February 1918
Location	Tornio, Finland
Result	White victory

Belligerents
Finnish Whites; Swedish Brigade	Finnish Reds; Russian Garrison

Commanders and leaders
Friedel Jacobsson †; Kurt Wallenius; Aarne Heikinheimo; Tauno Juvonen †; Mikko Kohonen	Unknown

Strength
278 Whites; 175 Swedish Volunteers	Around 200 Reds; Around 450 Russians

Casualties and losses
9 in total	Around 40 Dead; 360 Russian Prisoners; 70–80 Red Prisoners; 3 executed

The Battle of Tornio refers to a battle of the Finnish Civil War, that took place in the City of Tornio between the Whites and the Reds.

== Red and White Order of Battle ==
The Whites in the city, had organized themselves into a White Guard Unit in 15 January, and were in total around 73 members. With rising tensions, on 30 January 175 Jaegers came from Haparanda, Sweden and joined the already organized White Guard. On the Following day, Major Friedel Jacobsson who was the highest-ranking military official in Tornio, took command of the White Guard in the city. They were also better equipped, having 4 machine-guns.

The Reds had organized themselves into a Red Guard in November 1917, which originally consisted of around 300 men, however around 90 of them were transported to Oulu on 1 February, leaving around 200 Reds left in the city. The Reds were also supported by the local Russian Garrison, whose numbers had been rapidly depleting, having around 1,300 men in Tornio during fall, with there being around 450 left of them when the conflict started.

== The Battle ==
The first subject to the battle was a local high school called Peräpohjolan Opisto, where around 50 Russian Garrison were located. All of them surrendered, and the high school had been cleared at around 3 p.m. At 15:00, another White Guard Group had advanced towards the Railway Station, At the same time, the Civilian White Guard crossed the Torne River from Suensaari to secure positions.

At 16:30, Mikko Kohonen and Tauno Jovenen's Groups, led by Jacobbson, came into conflict with Russians and Reds at the Northern section of the Railway Station. The Russians had positions set up at the curve of the railway track heading towards Kemi, however some reports say that some of the Russians may have fired from Medical vehicles, from where they fired at White positions. However they had to give up the fight, and some of the Russians fled to Sweden. Wallenius advanced his forces to the Southern section of the Railway Station, where after a few hours of fighting, the Reds surrendered. The following day, The remainder of the Russian Garrison at Alatornio Church surrendered. The Tornio Red Guard did not engage in the fighting, instead they surrendered en masse.
