= Lapland University of Applied Sciences =

Institute of higher education in Lapland, Finland

Lapland University of Applied Sciences (UAS)
- Lapin ammattikorkeakoulu (AMK)
- Former names: Kemi-Tornio UAS and Rovaniemi UAS
- Motto: Pohjoista tekoa
- Motto in English: The Northern Factor
- Type: Public
- Established: 2014
- Budget: EUR 43 million
- Rector: Riitta Rissanen
- Administrative staff: 460 (2019)
- Students: 5300 (2019)
- Location: Kemi, Tornio, Rovaniemi, Lapland, Finland
- Website: www.lapinamk.fi/en

Lapland University of Applied Sciences (Finnish: Lapin ammattikorkeakoulu), in short Lapland UAS (Finnish: Lapin AMK), is a Finnish polytechnic university located in the cities of Kemi, Tornio and Rovaniemi. It was founded on January 1, 2014 as a merger between Rovaniemi University of Applied Sciences and Kemi-Tornio University of Applied Sciences. The merger carried over all the features of the previous organizations in an expanded organization form.

The institution has roughly 5000 students and 500 staff working on the three campuses.

Lapland UAS has two distinct schools, the school of Northern Well-being and services, and the school of School of Arctic Natural Resources and Economy.

== History ==
Kemi-Tornio University of Applied Sciences was established in 1992. Rovaniemi University of Applied Sciences was established in 1996. Together with the University of Lapland, they were and the new Lapland University of Applied Sciences is part of the Lapland University Consortium.

Kemi and Tornio are situated in the Finnish Lapland, close to the Swedish border on the Gulf of Bothnia and Rovaniemi is situated further north and inland close to the arctic circle.

== Partnerships ==
Lapland UAS is an active member of the University of the Arctic. UArctic is an international cooperative network based in the Circumpolar Arctic region, consisting of more than 200 universities, colleges, and other organizations with an interest in promoting education and research in the Arctic region.

The university participates in UArctic's mobility program north2north. The aim of that program is to enable students of member institutions to study in different parts of the North.

== Study programs ==
Lapland UAS offers a variety of study options for Finnish speakers in fields such as hospitality, health and welfare, communications, arts, and business administration.

For international students, Lapland UAS has five bachelor's programs taught in English, and one master's level program.

Bachelors programs in English	Master's programs in English
International Business	Master of Business Administration (Online)
International Sport Business and Management	Master Programme in Managing Sustainability and Systems Change (partly online)
Machine Learning and Data Engineering	
Nursing	
Tourism	

== See also ==
- List of polytechnics in Finland
