= Alpine Stake Tabernacle =

Historic church in Utah, United States

- U.S. Historic district – Contributing property
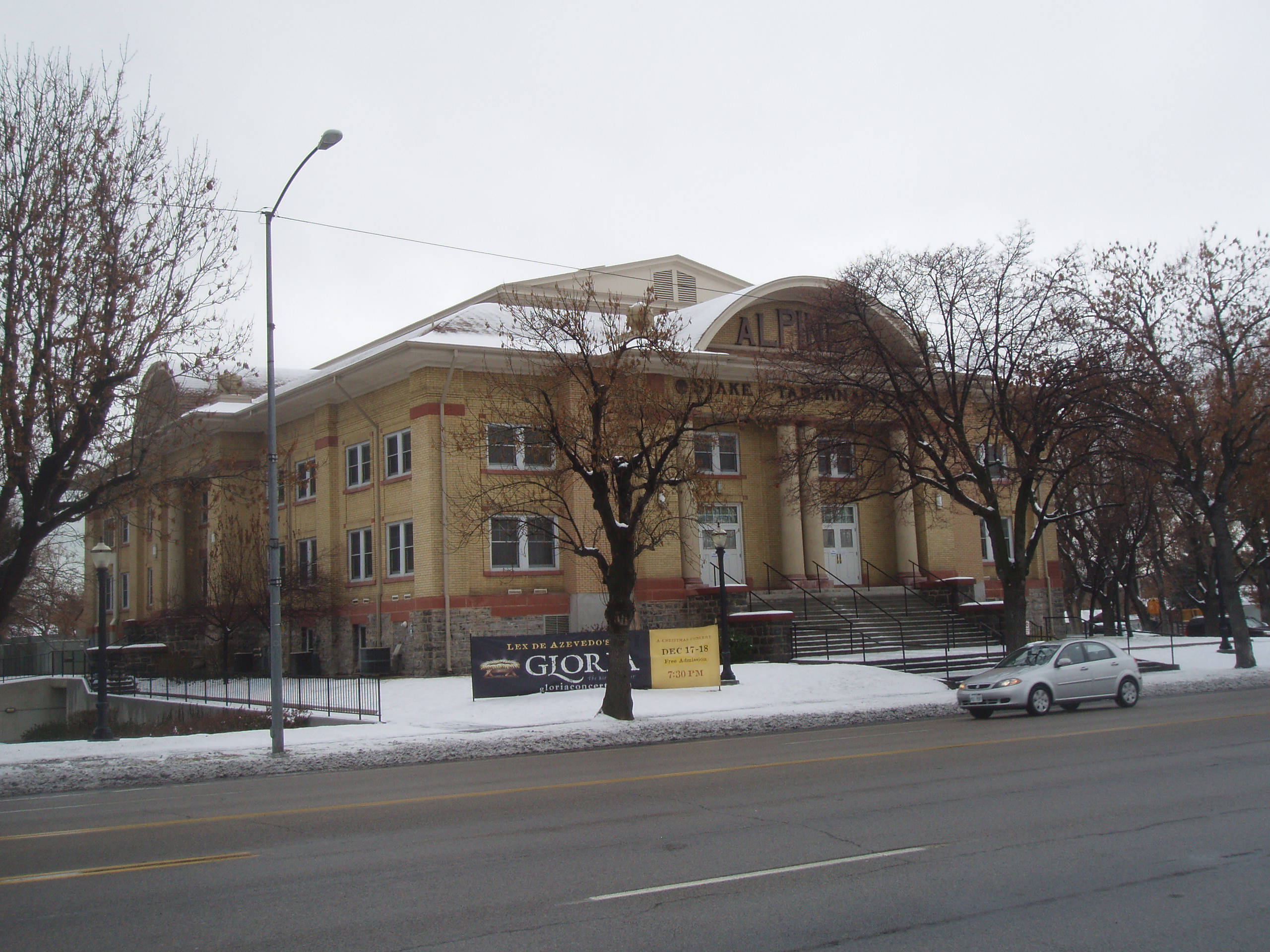
- Alpine Stake Tabernacle, December 2010

- Location within Utah Location within the United States
- Location: 110 East Main Street; American Fork, Utah; United States
- Coordinates: 40.3765°N 111.7955°W
- Built: 1914
- Architect: Liljenberg & Maeser
- Part of: American Fork Historic District (ID98001447)
- Added to NRHP: December 10, 1988

The Alpine Stake Tabernacle or Alpine Tabernacle, located at 110 East Main Street (US-89) in American Fork, Utah, United States, functions as a meeting place for large gatherings of members of the Church of Jesus Christ of Latter-day Saints (LDS Church) in northern Utah County for worship services. The building is part of the American Fork Historic District listed on the National Register of Historic Places.

== Construction ==
Plans for the tabernacle began soon after the formation of the Alpine Stake and drawings were made by the architectural design firm Liljenberg & Maeser. Construction on the foundation began in 1909 and the cornerstone was dedicated in 1910 by Orson F. Whitney. The structure was completed in 1914 at a cost of $80,000 and dedicated the following year in 1915 by LDS Church president Joseph F. Smith. The exterior is built with stone, red sandstone and yellow brick and does not feature a tower or steeple. The interior seats about 1,200 and retains much original decoration. Like many of the church's tabernacles, it houses a grand pipe organ. It also was built with a baptismal font. The tabernacle was extensively remodeled at a cost of $230,000 in 1962 and rededicated by Henry D. Moyle. It was remodeled again in 1982. In 1994, the tabernacle was closed for a period of time while renovations were undertaken, including an extensive asbestos abatement. The tabernacle reopened in 1995 and continues to function as a tabernacle and hold various civic meetings.

== See also ==
- National Register of Historic Places listings in Utah County, Utah
