= Walter Christensen =

Walter Christensen may refer to:

- Cuckoo Christensen (1899–1984), American professional baseball player
- John Walther Christensen ("Walther Christensen") (1918–1965), Danish amateur football player
- Walter Christensen (performer), who performed at Beaver Opera House and elsewhere in early 1900s
