= Battle of Lempäälä =

1918 battle of the Finnish Civil War

- Part of the Finnish Civil War
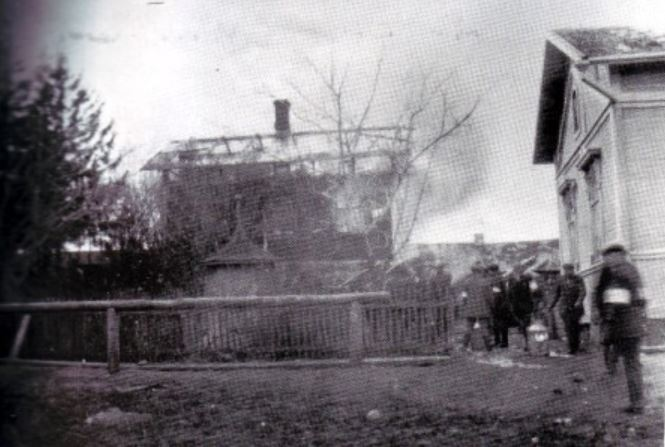
- Burning House due to Red Artillery Fire
Date	23 March – 24 April 1918 (1 month and 1 day)
Location	Lempäälä, Finland
Result	White victory

Belligerents
Finnish Whites; Swedish Brigade	Finnish Reds

Commanders and leaders
Karl Fredrik Wilkman; Allan Winge	Eino Rahja

Strength
2,500 to 4,000; Unknown	500 to 5,000

Casualties and losses
194 fallen in combat 2 Swedish Casualties	249 fallen in combat 230–400 executed

The Battle of Lempäälä refers to a series of battles that took place within the areas of Lempäälä and neighboring Vesilahti during the 1918 Finnish Civil War.

== Background ==
Lempäälä was a relatively quiet place within the first weeks of the war, however as it was under the Red controlled area, the Red forces quickly took over important strategical hubs within the settlement, such as the railway station, the telephone exchange, the municipal hall and the savings bank.

== The Battle of Lempäälä ==
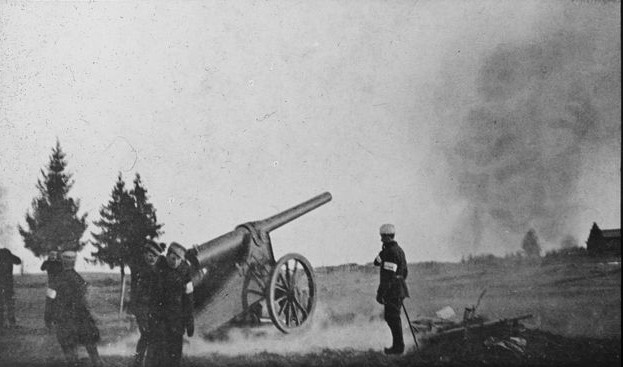
White Artillery in Lempäälä

=== White Capture of the Village ===
The battles within Lempäälä were directly linked to the Battle for Tampere. Colonel Karl Wilkman was directly ordered by C.G Mannerheim to capture Lempäälä with a route through Kangasala to blockade and encircle Tampere. Kangasala was captured on 22 March and following a short battle, Lempäälä was captured by the White forces. The Reds in Lempäälä consisted of local poorly trained militia and some Helsinki Red Guardsmen, who quickly fell to the vastly outnumbering White forces around 25 March.

=== Red Counterattack ===
Following their defeat, Eino Rahja gathered a group of around 2,000 men from Southern Finland and St. Petersburg and started an attack to break the encirclement of Tampere. There was a severe focus of the fighting in Lempäälä on the isthmus between Lake Vanajavesi and Lake Pyhäjärvi, and the Reds initially managed on pushing back the White forces and there was a hope of breaking the encirclement in Tampere. The two last reserve battalions within the Lempäälä area were ordered to counterattack, scything the Reds ability to relieve Tampere. When the news of Tampere's fall to the Whites reached the Lempäälä Red Guard, they stopped their offensive towards Tampere and started a attritional war. However, on the 24th of April, the Red Guard in Lempäälä was ordered to retreat.

== Casualties ==
According to War Victims of Finland 1914–1922, which is a database published by the National Archives of Finland, around 194 Whites fell in total in the battle, and around 43 of them being at Vesilahti, including two Swedish volunteers. Around 249 Reds fell in total in the battle, around 61 of them being at Vesilahti.

== See also ==
- Battle of Helsinki
- Battle of Tampere
