= Kemi-Tornio University of Applied Sciences =

University of applied sciences in Finland

- Motto: Gives value to you
- Type: Public
- Active: 1992–2013
- Rector: Reijo Tolppi
- Administrative staff: 250
- Students: 2,600
- Location: Kemi, Tornio, Finland; 65.8420°N 24.1502°E

Kemi-Tornio University of Applied Sciences (KTUAS; Finnish: Kemi-Tornion ammattikorkeakoulu, KTAMK) was a Finnish University of applied sciences located in Kemi and Tornio. It was founded in 1992 as Kemi-Tornio Polytechnic, a merger of several institutes of higher vocational education in the Kemi-Tornio region of Finland. It was merged with Rovaniemi University of Applied Sciences into Lapland University of Applied Sciences on 1 January 2014.

Kemi-Tornio University of Applied Sciences worked in two neighbouring towns: Kemi and Tornio. There were altogether 2,600 degree students, about 10% of which were foreign students coming mainly from Asia, Russia and Africa. KTUAS provided higher professional education for young and adults leading to bachelor's and master's degrees. KTUAS had a variety of 18 degree programmes, in five of which the language of tuition and studying was English.

Kemi-Tornio University of Applied Sciences has won international recognition for its eLearning programmes.

== History ==
Kemi-Tornio University of Applied Sciences was established in 1992. At the moment there are altogether 2,600 students and the staff consists of approximately 250 persons.

Kemi and Tornio are situated in the Finnish Lapland, by the Swedish border. The Kemi-Tornion region offers a wide range of services. The people of Kemi and Tornio derive their livelihood from the paper and wood industries, steel industries, high-tech enterprises and engineering works.

Kemi-Tornio UAS considers its most important task to be the training of entrepreneurial spirited, highly skilled people, who understand the conditions and possibilities of the North. The UAS provides education for the young and adults leading to Bachelor's and master's degrees in the fields of business and administration, culture, technology, health care and social services and natural sciences. KTUAS has a variety of 18 degree programmes, in five of which the language of teaching and studying is English.

From the student's point of view, the strengths of the Kemi-Tornio UAS are modern technology and know-how in eLearning, co-operation with the business and working life both in Finland and abroad as well as internationalization.

The Kemi-Tornio UAS has developed a broad and active network for international co-operation opening up opportunities for students to complete part of their Bachelor's thesis and practical training abroad. The University supports the development of students' personal professional skills with versatile teaching methods as well as independent study through supportive guidance.

== The Fields of Study ==
- Business Administration
- Cultural and Media Arts
- Information Communication Technology (ICT)
- Health Care and Social Services
- Technology

=== International Bachelor's Degree Programmes ===
- Degree Programme in Business Management
- Degree Programme in Business Information Technology
- Degree Programme in Social Services
- Degree Programme in Nursing

=== International Master's Degree Programmes ===
- International Business Management

== Research and development ==
The purpose of the Research and Development department is to create and advance internationalization strategy and to be responsible for integrating international activities with the research and studies at Kemi-Tornio University of Applied Sciences.

The role of the department is to consult as well as to create and execute projects and to operate as a project organization where the physical location of workers is not relevant when carrying out the operations.

The operations of Research and Development department are especially targeted to certain areas of focus. These areas of focus include The Nordic Countries and the neighboring North Calotte area, as well as the familiar collaboration area of European Union countries, but on a wider scale than previously. Resources are also aimed at cooperation with Russia and particularly with the Barents region.

The central field of operation of Research and Development department is the EU project work. The basis for acquiring and implementing projects is engaging them as an integral part of the applied research of the UAS. The project leaders and other needed workers are recruited mainly from the personnel of the UAS, in which case the project experiences can be directly utilized in education. This way the project working contributes also teachers' acquisition of qualifications and further education. By means of the projects, opportunities will be provided for the students to complete theses and carry out practical training periods.

A substantial element of the project work is the international collaboration realized with the local commercial and industry life. The objectives of this form of activity are to develop both regional enterprises and public sector, to enhance employment and create connections to international companies and other partners in cooperation by utilizing the possibilities information society provides.

=== Strategic fields of expertise ===
In Industrial Lapland KTUAS develops know-how in

- maintenance,
- product development and
- enterprise resource management (ERP).

In Lapland of Well being, KTUAS develops multidisciplinary know-how in preventive and re-rehabilitative work in

- elderly care
- welfare of children, young people and families
- occupational health
- regional research and development of welfare services.

In Lapland of Experiments and Culture KTUAS invests in

- social media know-how and

founding Northern Culture Institute

- In Lapland of Business and Entrepreneurship KTUAS develops know-how in
- international business and new business operations models and
- software design and software business.

=== IT LAB ===
IT Laboratory located in Minerva (ATK 9) is owned by the Department of Information Processing. Several students from various groups make their practical placement at this place. The goal of the IT lab is to apply theoretical knowledge in practical life and get in touch with business life of the region working with real tasks from companies.

Services provided by IT Lab are:

- Website designing (From simple websites to eCommerce & social media sites, booking and reservation system, video solution etc.)
- Content management system
- Web application development
- e-Commerce development
- PC services, maintenance and repair
- Software installation
- Mobile applications etc..

== eLearning Centre ==
The eLearning Centre of Kemi-Tornio University of Applied Sciences was created in the year 2000 concurrent with the Finnish policy towards the creation of the foremost information and knowledge society in Europe. Although administratively the centre is a support unit of the University of Applied Sciences, it serves all organizations associated with the Kemi-Tornionlaakso Municipal Education and Training Consortium Lappia.

The eLearning Centre's main tasks have concerned the adoption and administration of online learning environments (presently Moodle and iLinc) and both pedagogical and technical instruction and support for students and staff endeavouring to learn and teach in these environments.

The eLearning Centre also initiates and participates in research and development projects in the fields of electronic and distance education such as the Finnish Virtual Polytechnic. One of the fruits of that labour was the creation of the award-winning eDegree concept for distant learners in Lapland and Finland at large.

== See also ==
- List of polytechnics in Finland
