= Murray LDS Second Ward Meetinghouse =

Historic church in Utah, United States

- U.S. National Register of Historic Places
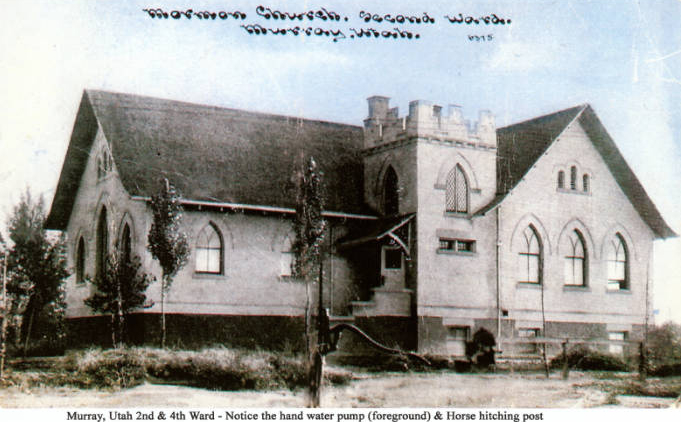
- Circa 1915, with hitching post and hand pump

- Location within Utah Location within the United States
- Location: 5056 South 300 West; Murray, Utah; United States
- Coordinates: 40°39′43″N 111°53′55″W
- Area: 1.4 acres (0.57 ha)
- Built: 1906
- Architectural style: Gothic
- MPS: Murray City, Utah MPS
- NRHP reference No.: 01000475
- Added to NRHP: May 8, 2001

Built in 1909, the Murray LDS Second Ward Meetinghouse is a historic building in Murray, Utah, United States. It was listed on the National Register of Historic Places in 2001. The building is significant for its association with the history and development of Murray between 1909 and 1950.

== Architectural style ==
The design of the meetinghouse came from Niels Edward Liljenberg, a Swedish-American architect. It is significant as a well-preserved example of a meetinghouse influenced by the Gothic Revival style, a popular style for Mormon meetinghouses in the Salt Lake Valley during the first decade of the twentieth century. The original architectural features are still evident, the fenestration patterns as well as the size of the openings have not been modified, and there have been very few alterations. The Murray Second Ward represents not only the growth of the Church of Jesus Christ of Latter-day Saints (LDS Church) and development of the Murray community, but the building is also an excellent example of the influence of the Gothic style in LDS Church architecture.

== Influences ==
During the first decade of the twentieth century, the English parish style became the model for many LDS meetinghouses including the Murray Second Ward. This style was concurrent with the resurgence of medieval influence in American architecture. As the LDS Church wanted to follow current trends in architecture professionally trained architects were employed to design new buildings. The popularity of the Victorian Gothic influence in American architecture happened to coincide with the LDS Church's program to build new meetinghouses. These typical Gothic-style influenced meetinghouses are characterized generally by either an asymmetrical or symmetrical facade which is dominated by a square Norman architecture-style entrance tower; Gothic or Romanesque arches or a combination of the two, are used throughout the building. The Murray Second Ward Meetinghouse fits this description well; it has an asymmetrical facade dominated by an entrance tower with a crenellated parapet, and tall, Gothic (pointed) arch windows framed in wood tracery.

== First meetinghouse ==
The first LDS or Mormon meetinghouse in Murray was built in 1856. As in most pioneer LDS communities, the first meetinghouse was vernacular classical in style and was built with the nearest and most available materials. It was understood that in time, a larger, more substantial facility would replace this first building. In communities that did not have a temple or tabernacle, the ward meetinghouse was the primary physical symbol of their relationship to God; it was a common element within the Mormon concept of sacred space.

== Scandinavian ward ==
Many of the men employed at the Franklyn and Germania smelters were immigrants from Scandinavian countries who had joined the LDS church in their homeland and moved to Utah; most spoke very little English. In 1883 Bishop Rawlins of the South Cottonwood Ward allowed the Scandinavian population to hold separate services in the Swedish language. At first the group met in the homes of various members; by 1893 the group had built a small wood frame meetinghouse located "west of the state road". This became known as the "unofficial" Scandinavian Ward.

== Murray ward organized ==
On October 28, 1900, the Murray Ward was formally organized as an outgrowth of the South Cottonwood Ward, and Uriah G. Miller was appointed as the first bishop. Six years later, on March 4, 1906, the ward was divided, creating the Murray First Ward and Murray Second Ward; Jacob E. Erekson was Bishop of the Second Ward. The geographic boundaries of the Murray Second Ward included the area west of the Oregon Short Line Railroad tracks to the Jordan River, and between the north and south Murray City limits.

== New meetinghouse built ==
The newly created Second Ward held their meetings in the twenty-foot by thirty-five-foot wood-frame meetinghouse built by the Scandinavians in 1893. Almost immediately, steps were taken towards establishing a new meetinghouse. On September 10, 1906, a 1 1/2-acre parcel was purchased from Peter Adamson for $400.00; the property was located on the west side of Second West Street (now Third West Street). In 1909, the new brick meetinghouse was completed; it was formally dedicated in 1911. With seating, fixtures and musical instruments, the price of the new facility came to $13,000.00. The floor plan is in the shape of a T; the stem of the T (or front) was used for assembly and services, while "amusements" were located in the (rear) section perpendicular to the chapel. The old "Scandinavian" meetinghouse continued to be used as a storage facility.

According to a 1933 Stake Report, during the months of November and December the chapel, amusement hall and classrooms were renovated. The exterior wood trim was painted, and the interior wood trim was re-varnished. The ceiling in the auditorium was painted, and the walls and ceilings in the chapel and amusement hall were replaced, painted and "starched". The walls in the classrooms were "re-calcimined", the boiler was overhauled and new flues were installed, and new linoleum flooring was laid in the front entrance hall.

== Sale of former meetinghouse ==
The Alano Club in 2026

In 1956, the boundaries of the ward were changed no doubt due to growth in the population of Murray. Beginning in 1970, proposals were made for construction of a new meetinghouse. In 1977 the building was sold to the current owners, the Alano Club. The Alano Club is a not-for-profit non-denominational support agency for recovering alcoholics and their families. The building additionally houses the local coffee shop Rise & Grind Coffee.

== See also ==
- National Register of Historic Places listings in Salt Lake County, Utah
