= Oulu University of Applied Sciences =

Institute of higher education in Northern Ostrobothnia, Finland

Coordinates: 65.061295°N 25.467637°E

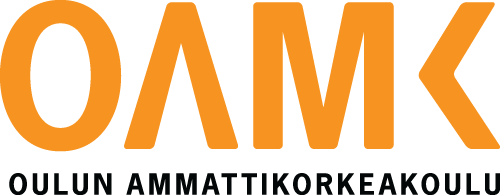
- Motto: Trust yourself
- Type: Public
- Established: 1996
- Rector: Heidi Fagerholm
- Administrative staff: 500
- Students: 9,000
- Location: Oulu, Finland
- Website: www.oamk.fi/en/

Oulu University of Applied Sciences (OAMK) (Finnish: Oulun ammattikorkeakoulu) is a university of applied sciences in Oulu, Finland, with approximately 9,000 students, including around 240 international degree students. The number of incoming exchange students annually is approximately 280.

== Education ==
=== Degree programmes ===
OAMK offers education in approximately 28 bachelor's degree programmes and 17 master's degree programmes in the following fields:

- Information Technology
- Culture
- Business
- Natural Resources
- Technology
- Social Services and Health Care

All have courses in English. Two bachelor's degree programmes and four master's degree programmes are conducted entirely in English:.

- Degree Programme in Information Technology (BEng)
- Degree Programme in International Business (BBA)
- Degree Programme in Clinical Optometry (Master of Health Care)
- Degree Programme In Education Entrepreneurship (Master of Culture and Arts)
- Degree Programme in Printed Intelligence (MEng)
- Degree Programme in Water and Environmental Management (MEng)

=== Professional teacher education ===
Professional Teacher Education Programme is meant for teachers and teacher applicants who plan to work at universities of applied sciences or at vocational institutions/colleges.

=== Other education ===
- Open university studies
- Short-term supplementary training

== Research, development and innovation activities ==
In addition to education, another basic function of OAMK is its research, development and innovation (RDI) activities. RDI activities are guided by the focus areas defined in OAMK’s strategy 2020–2030:

- Environmental knowledge
- Sustainable well-being
- Digital disruption.

RDI activities support the development of the Oulu region and Northern Finland. OAMK co-operates with local enterprises to ensure high-quality education and constant development.

In addition to the strategy, OAMK's RDI work is guided by Oulu Innovation Alliance, a strategic co-operation agreement formed in 2009 by OAMK and the City of Oulu, the University of Oulu, VTT Technical Research Centre of Finland, and Technopolis Plc. OAMK is committed to focusing its activities on the agreed areas of innovation, investing in agreed infrastructures and developing mechanisms for the joint use of the alliance.

Oulu UAS is an active member of the University of the Arctic. UArctic is an international cooperative network based in the Circumpolar Arctic region, consisting of more than 200 universities, colleges, and other organizations with an interest in promoting education and research in the Arctic region.

The university participates in UArctic's mobility program north2north. The aim of that program is to enable students of member institutions to study in different parts of the North.

== Schools ==
- School of Business
- School of Engineering and Natural Resources
- School of Information Technology
- School of Media and Performing Arts
- School of Health and Social Care (Oulu and Oulainen Campus)
- School of Professional Teacher Education

== See also ==
- List of polytechnics in Finland
