= Swedish Brigade =

Swedish paramilitary unit during the 1918 Finnish Civil War

- Svenska brigaden
- Flag used by the Swedish Brigade
- Active: Jan-May 1918
- Disbanded: 30th May 1918
- Country: Sweden
- Allegiance: Finnish Whites
- Type: Infantry
- Size: 1,000
- Engagements: Finnish Civil War; Battle of Tampere; Battle of Lempäälä; Battle of Tornio

Commanders
- 6 March – 16 April: Hjalmar Frisell
- 17 April – 22 April: Lars V. Runeberg
- 23 April – May: Allan Winge

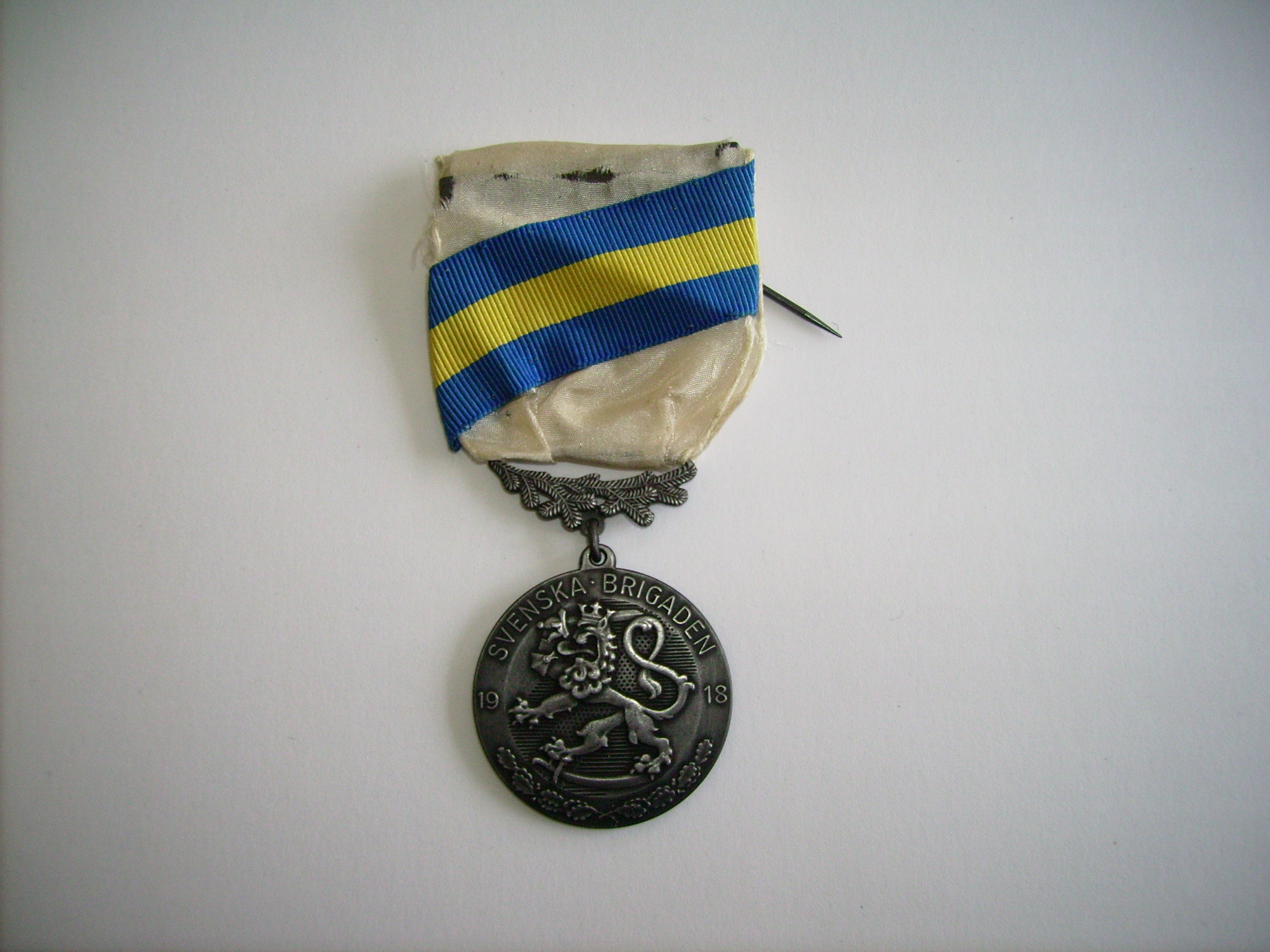
Swedish brigade medal 1918

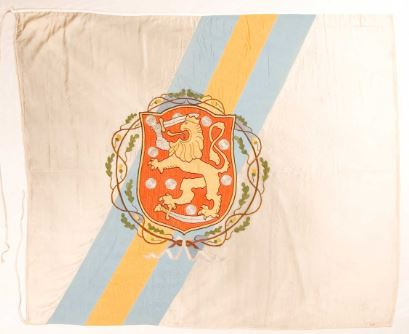
First flag of Swedish Brigade (1918)

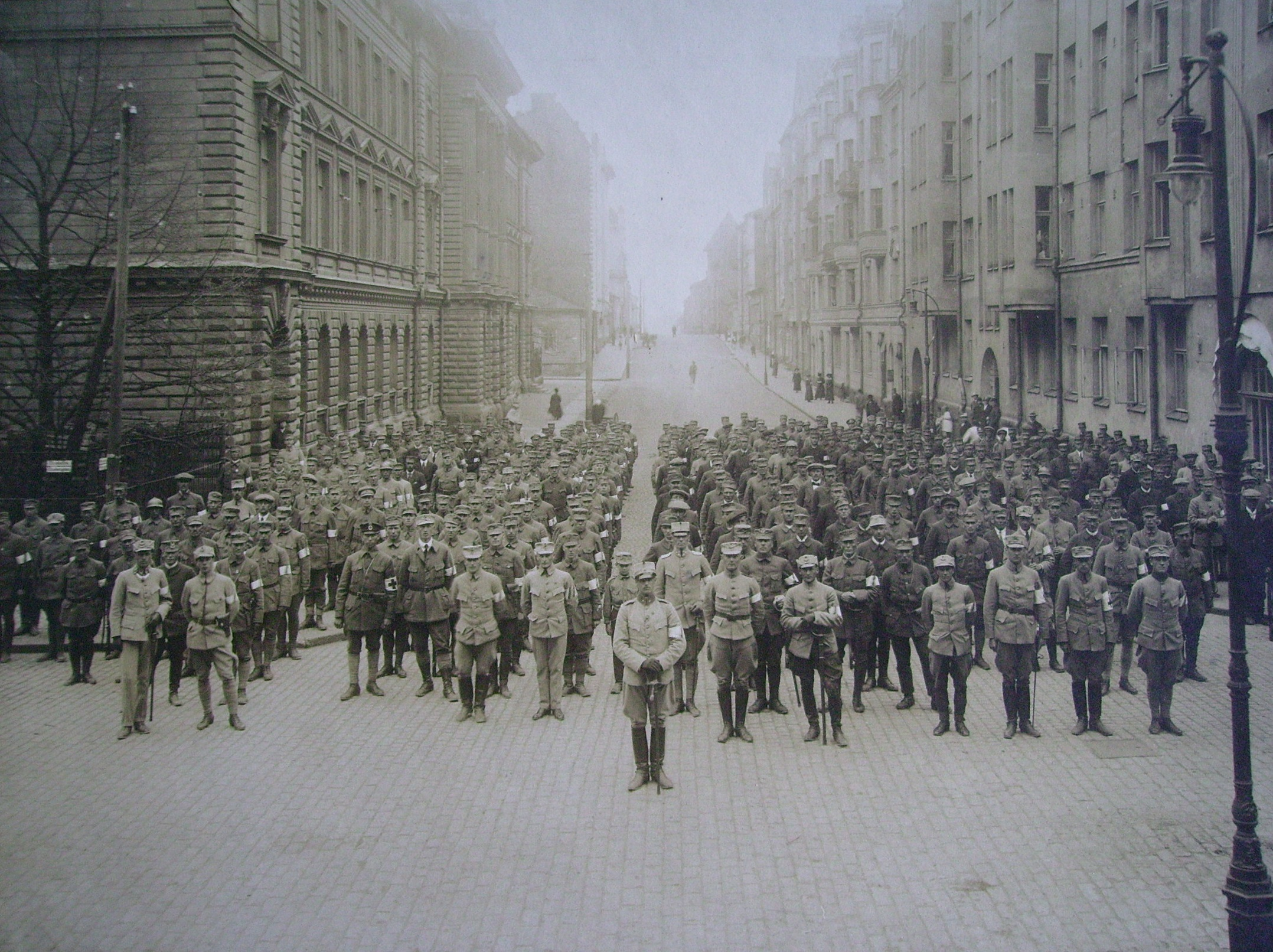
Swedish Brigade in Helsinki (1918)

The Swedish Brigade (Swedish: Svenska brigaden, Finnish: Ruotsalainen prikaati) was a paramilitary unit composed of 1,000 Swedish volunteers to assist the White Guards during the 1918 Finnish Civil War.

== History ==
The brigade participated in the Battle of Tampere between 28 March and 6 April. 34 members of the Swedish Brigade were killed in action and up to 50 wounded in the battle. Notable members included the archaeologist Axel Boëthius and the historian Olof Palme, the uncle and the namesake of the future prime minister.

The volunteer brigade received substantial funding from Swedish private industry, including a 5000 kronor personal donation from Ivar Kreuger.

It is suspected that the Swedish volunteers killed the Estonian Deputy Prime Minister Jüri Vilms. Vilms had traveled to Finland for instructions to get diplomatic recognition for his newly sovereign nation, but went missing. According to the Swedish Brigade war diaries, they executed three Estonians in the village of Hauho in 2 May. One of them was described as ″well-dressed″ and was carrying a large sum of money.

The brigade returned to Stockholm on May 30, 1918, where a victory parade was held, ending at the Olympic Stadium. Socialist activist and future member of the Riksdag Ture Nerman was arrested by the police for disturbing the peace by heckling the marching soldiers and saying "Shame on you, murderers!", resulting in a fine of 75 kronor. The trade unions banned the veterans, "who for paltry gold sold themselves to the Finnish upper class, and in its service mowed down not just hooligans and bandits, but organized Finnish workers, socialists, comrades and friends to us here at home." They were often denied jobs and physically attacked in the streets by working-class people.

== War crimes ==
Swedish volunteers extensively participated in the White Terror, carrying out summary and mass executions. For example, after the Battle of Karu, Swedish Brigade commander Harald Hjalmarson, despite professed reluctance to use violence, shot at least four Red Guards who had been taken prisoner, such as Matti Kuljun, a company manager from Tampere. The brigade was "possessed by the most bitter hatred for the red vermin". One participant, Carl-Gustaf Grönstrand, commented:

"Has not all of Finland been defenceless in their hands, have they spared society? They are not people, [but] beasts, which are to be exterminated, they are. They have no right to existence whatsoever and therefore they need to be gone. Soon you’ll be of the same opinion."
