= Joni Myllykoski =

Finnish ice hockey player (born 1984)

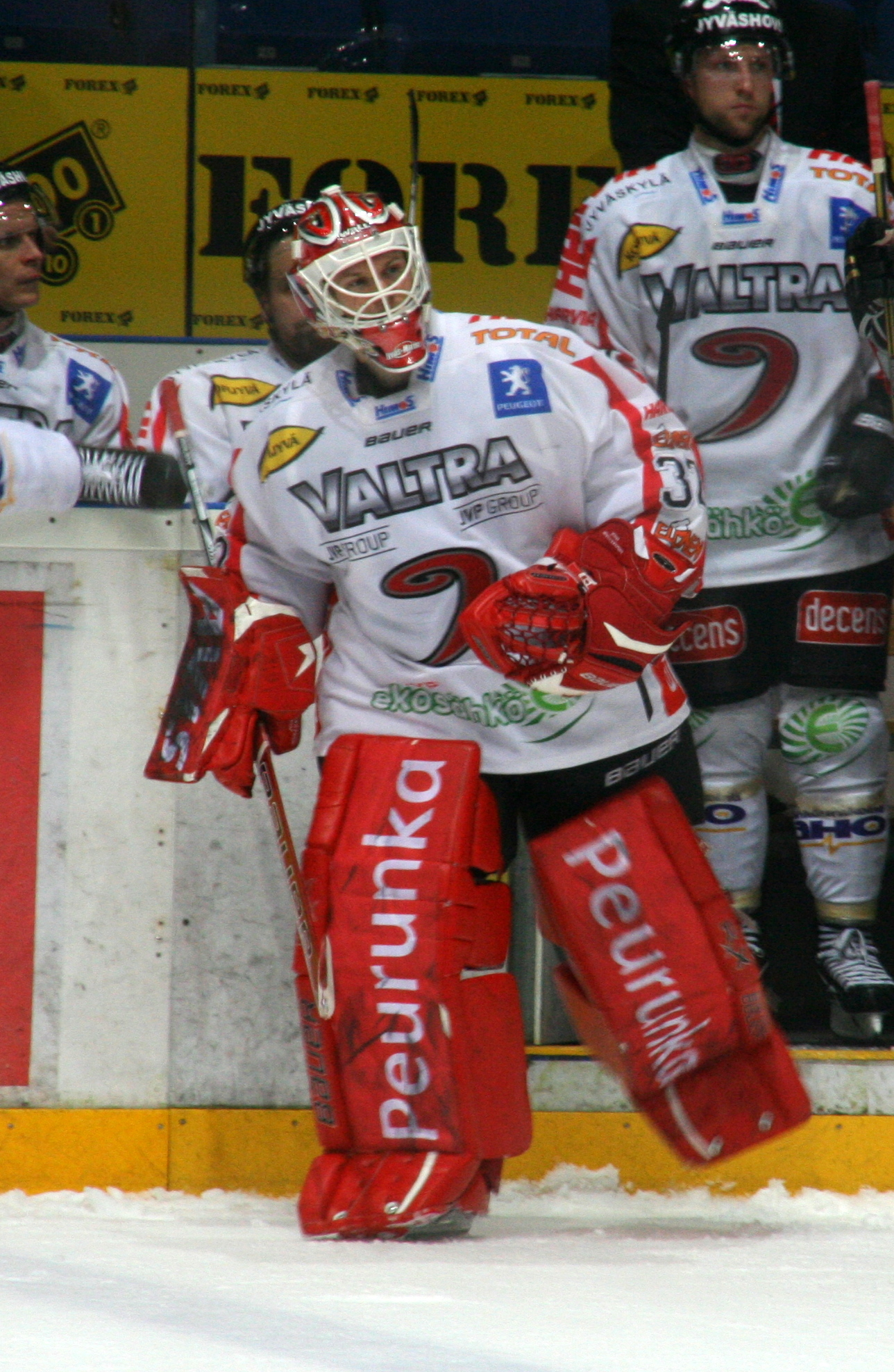
Joni Myllykoski

Joni Myllykoski (born July 2, 1984, in Tornio) is a Finnish ice hockey goaltender. He currently plays for JYP in the SM-liiga.
