= Novia University of Applied Sciences =

Institute of higher education in Finland

Coordinates: 63°06′19″N 21°35′45″E

Novia University of Applied Sciences, Novia UAS
- Yrkeshögskolan Novia
- Established: August 1, 2008
- Rector: Örjan Andersson
- Faculty: 400
- Students: 5 300
- Location: Vaasa, Turku, Raseborg and Jakobstad, Finland
- Website: www.novia.fi

The Novia University of Applied Sciences (Swedish: Yrkeshögskolan Novia) is an institution of higher professional education (vocational university) in Finland. It offers Bachelor's and Master's degree programmes in Swedish in Vaasa, Turku, Raseborg and Jakobstad.

The university was formed on August 1, 2008, by the merging of the Sydväst Polytechnic and the Swedish Polytechnic.

== Student Unions ==
The university has a proud tradition of student unions, and student union events are regularly held throughout the academic year.

- EKA - The Student Union for Novia UAS Raseborg campus
- ENÅ - The Studien Union for maritime students at Novia UAS Aboa Mare campus in Turku
- Filicia r.f. - The Student Union for all Engineering students at Novia UAS Vaasa campus
- MASK - The Student Union for Culture and Arts
- N.U.D - The Student Union for Nurses at Novia UAS Vaasa campus
- ÅKA - The Student Union at Novia UAS Turku campus
- SYH-FIILIS - an organisation for alumni of Novia UAS
