= Rovaniemi University of Applied Sciences =

- Rovaniemen ammattikorkeakoulu
- Type: University of applied sciences (polytechnic)
- Active: 1996–2013
- Rector: Martti Lampela
- Students: 3,079 (2010)
- Location: Rovaniemi, Lapland, Finland
- Website: www.ramk.fi

Rovaniemi University of Applied Sciences (Finnish: Rovaniemen ammattikorkeakoulu, RAMK) was a university of applied sciences in Rovaniemi, Finland.

It was established in 1996. Together with the University of Lapland and the Kemi-Tornio University of Applied Sciences, it is a part of the Lapland University Consortium. It merged with Kemi-Tornio University of Applied Sciences into the Lapland University of Applied Sciences on January 1, 2014.

== Courses ==
The fields of study includes natural resources and environment, tourism, nutrition and economics, social studies, health and sports, technology and transports, business and administration. There were 20 educational programs, of which 11 Finnish and 3 English-language programs lead to a university of applied sciences degree, 5 educational programs leading to a higher bachelor's degree and one English-language specialization study package.
