= Draper Park School =

- U.S. National Register of Historic Places
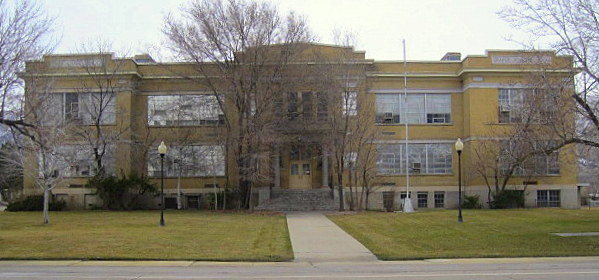

- Location within Utah Location within the United States
- Location: 12441 S. 900 East, Draper, Utah, U.S.
- Coordinates: 40°31′29″N 111°51′56″W
- Area: 2 acres (0.81 ha)
- Built: 1912
- Architect: Talboe, C.A.; Liljenberg, N.Edward
- Architectural style: Classical Revival
- NRHP reference No.: 80003913
- Added to NRHP: May 7, 1980

The Draper Park School, at 12441 South 900 East in Draper, Utah, is a Classical Revival style building that was built in 1912 and extended later. It was listed on the National Register of Historic Places in 1980.

It was named after Dr. John R. Park who, early in his career, was a school teacher in Draper. The building includes a historically significant Works Progress Administration mural painted by Paul Smith in 1938.

The building is now owned by Godfrey Properties & Design, founded by entertainer, filmmaker and action-sports athlete Gregg Godfrey. It was purchased by the company in 2015 with the intent to renovate, restore and revitalize the building for business use.
