= Beaver Opera House =

- U.S. National Register of Historic Places
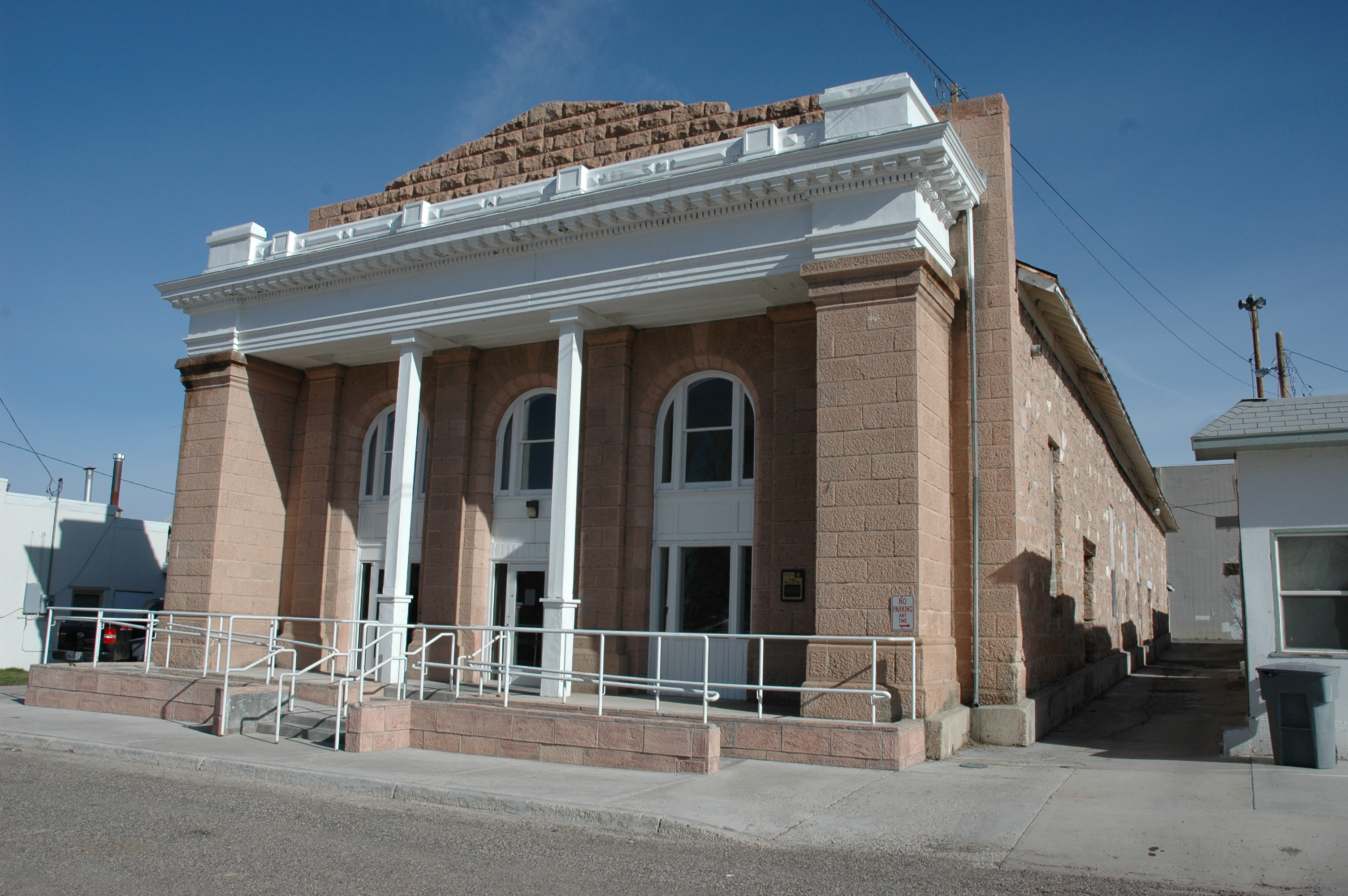
- Building in 2010.

- Location within Utah Location within the United States
- Location: 55 E. Center St., Beaver, Utah
- Coordinates: 38°16′29″N 112°38′23″W
- Area: less than one acre
- Architect: Liljenberg and Maeser
- NRHP reference No.: 82004078
- Added to NRHP: February 11, 1982

The Beaver Opera House, at 55 E. Center St. in Beaver, Utah, was listed on the National Register of Historic Places in 1982.

It originally had a capacity for 1,000 seated persons.

It was designed and built by architects Liljenberg and Maeser, for $20,000.

It is built of tuff, the pink stone that is used in many other Beaver buildings.

It served as a "center for community and church affairs" and as a theatre for about two decades.

Performers included Walter Christensen, Ralph Cloninger, Luke Gosgrave, and Shelby Roach.

From 1929 to c.1955, it was used for offices and storage by the Utah National Guard.
