= American Fork Historic District =

Historic district in Utah, United States

- U.S. National Register of Historic Places
- U.S. Historic district
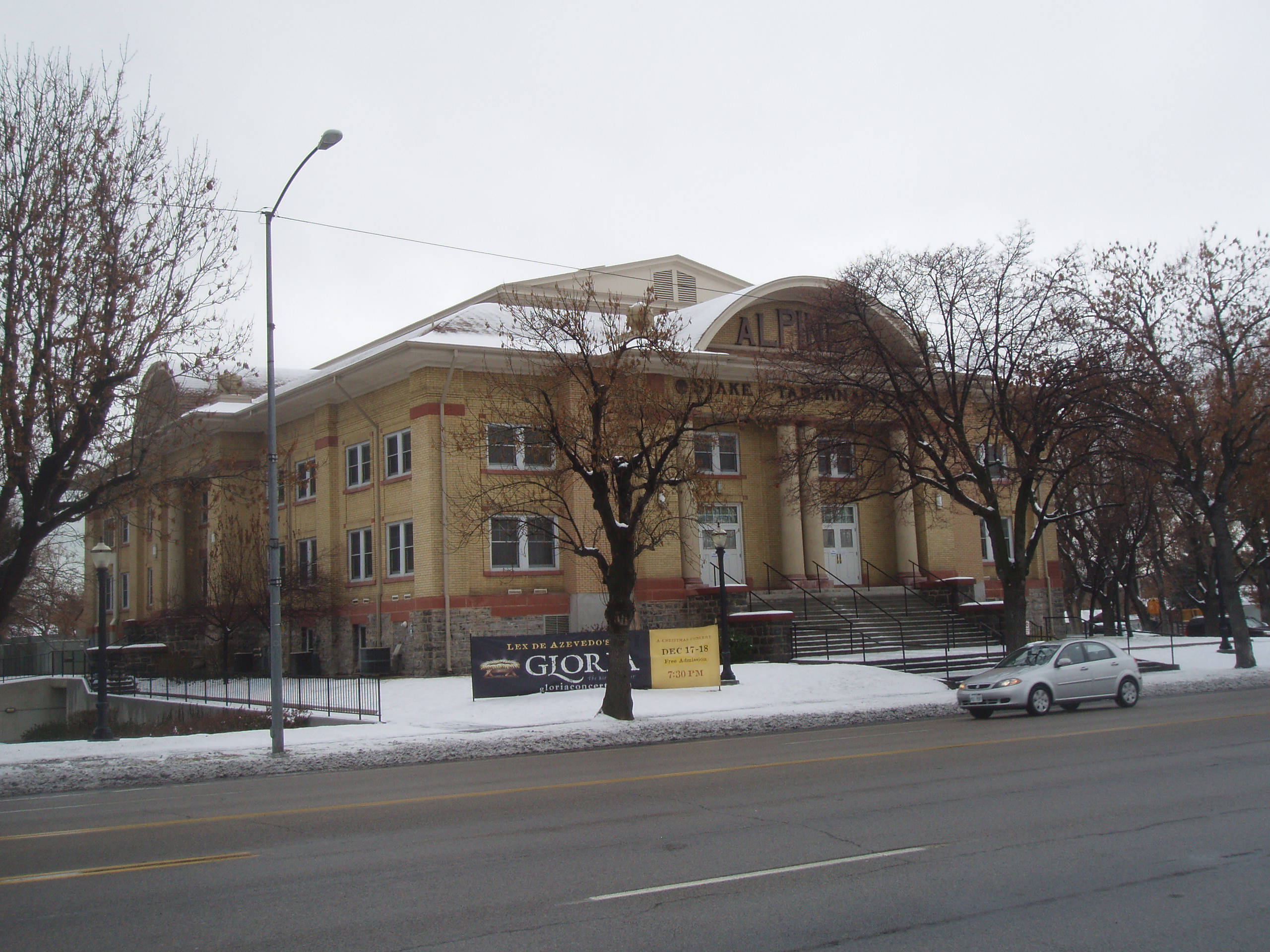
- Alpine Stake Tabernacle, December 2010

- Location within Utah Location within the United States
- Location: Roughly along 100 South (from 300 West to 200 East); American Fork, Utah; United States
- Area: 50 acres (20 ha)
- Built: 1949
- Architectural style: Greek Revival, Late Victorian, Late 19th and 20th Century Revivals
- NRHP reference No.: 98001447
- Added to NRHP: December 10, 1998

The American Fork Historic District is a 50-acre (20 ha) historic district in 1850-founded American Fork, Utah, United States, that was listed on the National Register of Historic Places in 1998.

== Description ==
The area has significance dating back to 1949. The boundaries are roughly 100 South between South 300 West and South 200 East along with parts of West Main Street, 200 West, South 100 West, South Center Street, and South 100 East. At listing the district included 104 contributing buildings. It includes Greek Revival, Late Victorian, and Late 19th and 20th Century Revivals architecture.

The district was deemed "locally significant, both architecturally and historically, because it represents the social, economic and architectural history of American Fork, Utah." Its architectural importance is for having intact examples of residences "built during the major construction periods in the town's history, from 1868-1940. The district accurately represents the wide range of architectural styles, types, and construction materials found in American Fork."

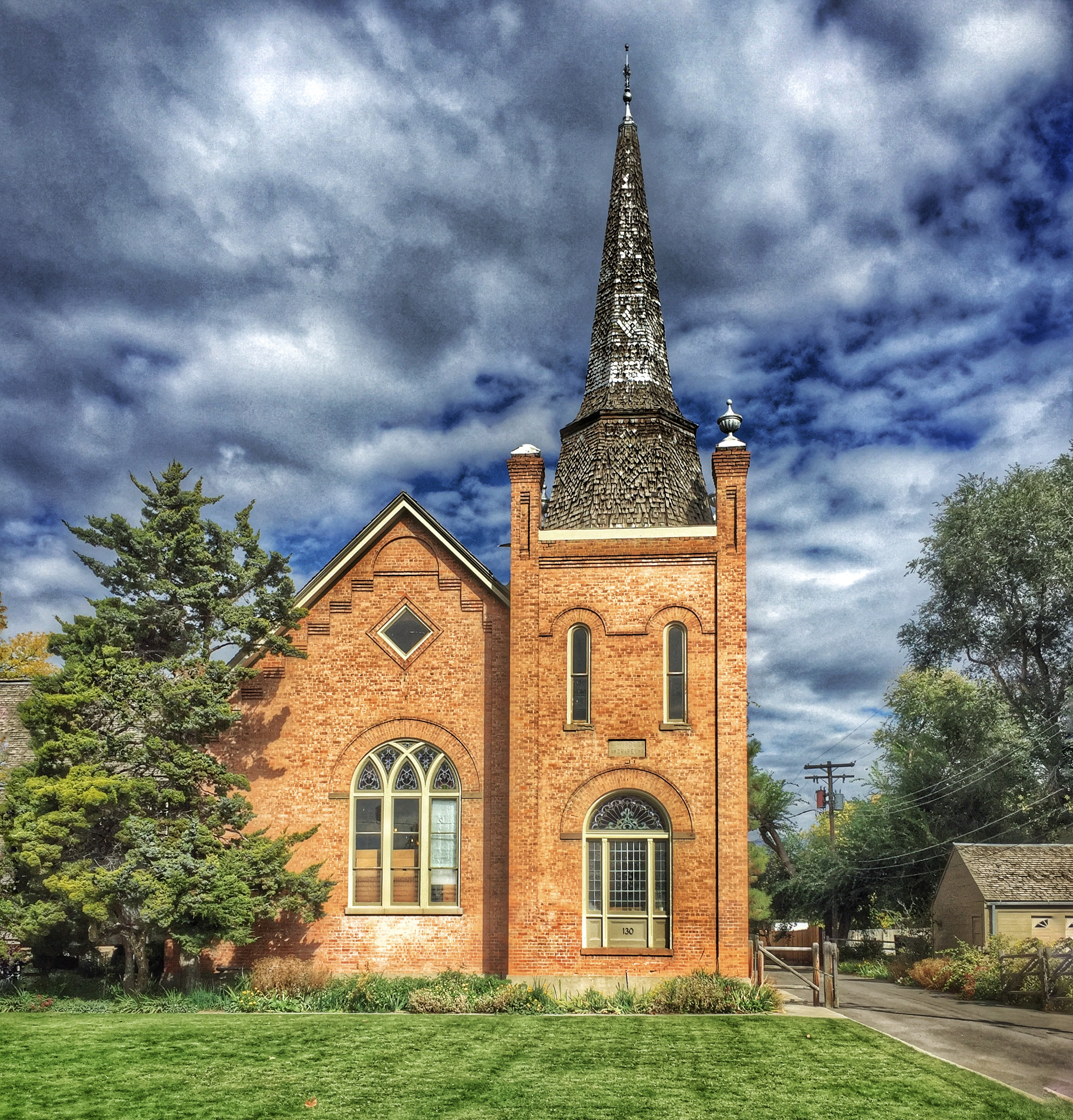
The American Fork Second Ward Meetinghouse, a former church that is listed separately on the National Register of Historic Places, but located within the American Fork Historic District, October 2015

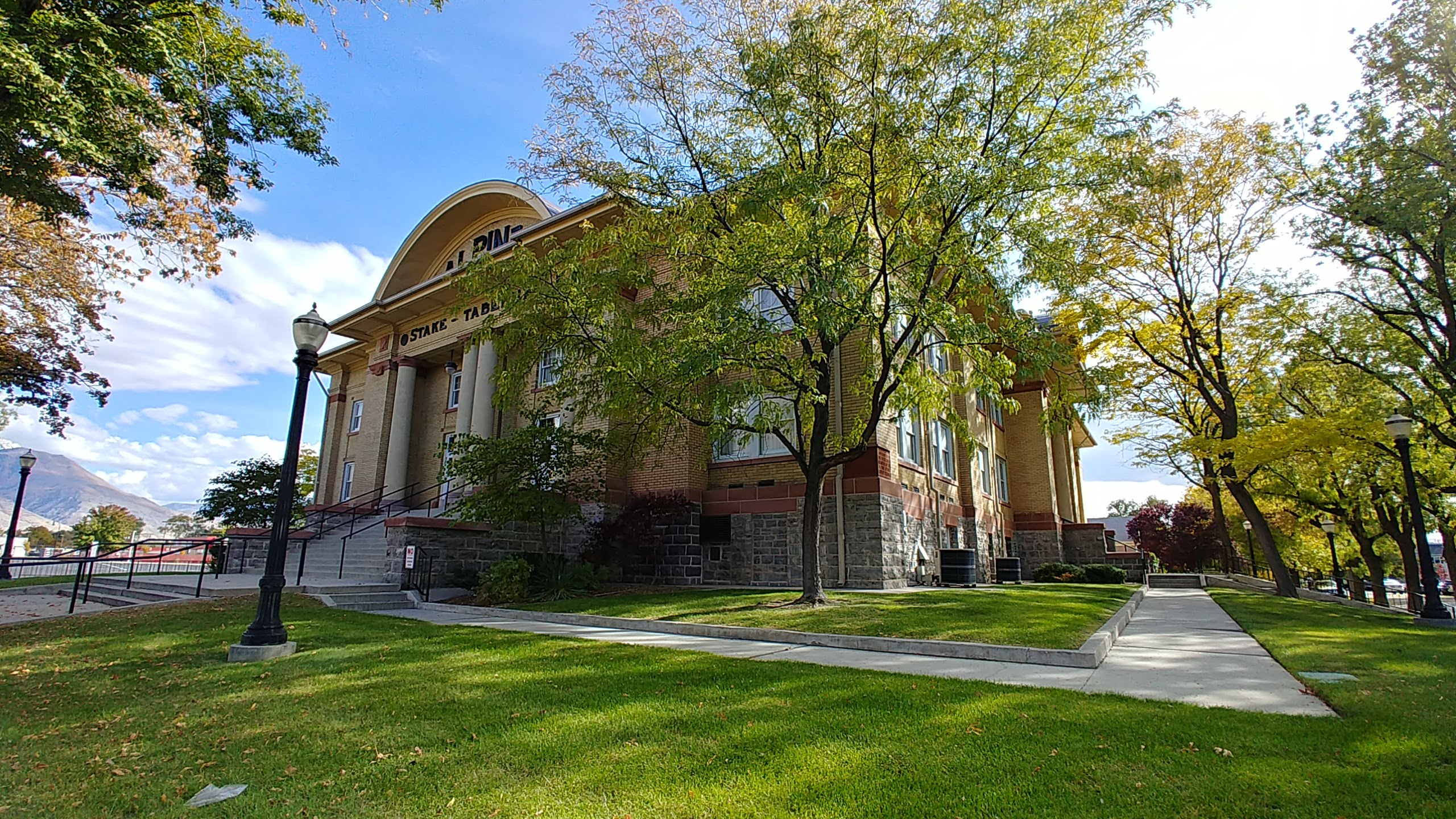
Alpine Tabernacle, October 2018

== See also ==
- National Register of Historic Places listings in Utah County, Utah
