= Swedish Polytechnic =

Vocational university in Vaasa, Finland

Svenska yrkeshögskolan, University of Applied Sciences
- Svenska yrkeshögskolan
- Established: 1997
- Rector: Örjan Andersson
- Academic staff: 100
- Students: 1,800
- Location: Vaasa, Finland
- Website: http://www.syh.fi/

The Swedish Polytechnic (Swedish: Svenska yrkeshögskolan) was an institution of higher professional education (vocational university) in Vaasa, Finland. It offered bachelor's and master's degree programmes in Swedish in the fields of technology, health care, social welfare in Vaasa and within culture in Nykarleby and Jakobstad.

On August 1, 2008, the University merged with the Sydväst Polytechnic to form the Novia University of Applied Sciences.

== Programmes ==
- Mechanical and Production Engineering
- Industrial Management and Engineering
- Electrical Engineering
- Information Technology
- Construction Engineering
- Land Surveying
- Environmental Engineering
- Laboratory Studies
- Health Care
- Radiography and Radiotherapy
- Medical Laboratory Studies
- Nursing
- Social Welfare
- Beauty Care
- Music
- Drama Studies
- Fine Arts
- Photography
- Film- and TV-production
- Design
