= Tornio =

Town in Lapland, Finland

Tornio Torneå Duortnus Tuárnus
- Town
- Tornion kaupunki Torneå stad
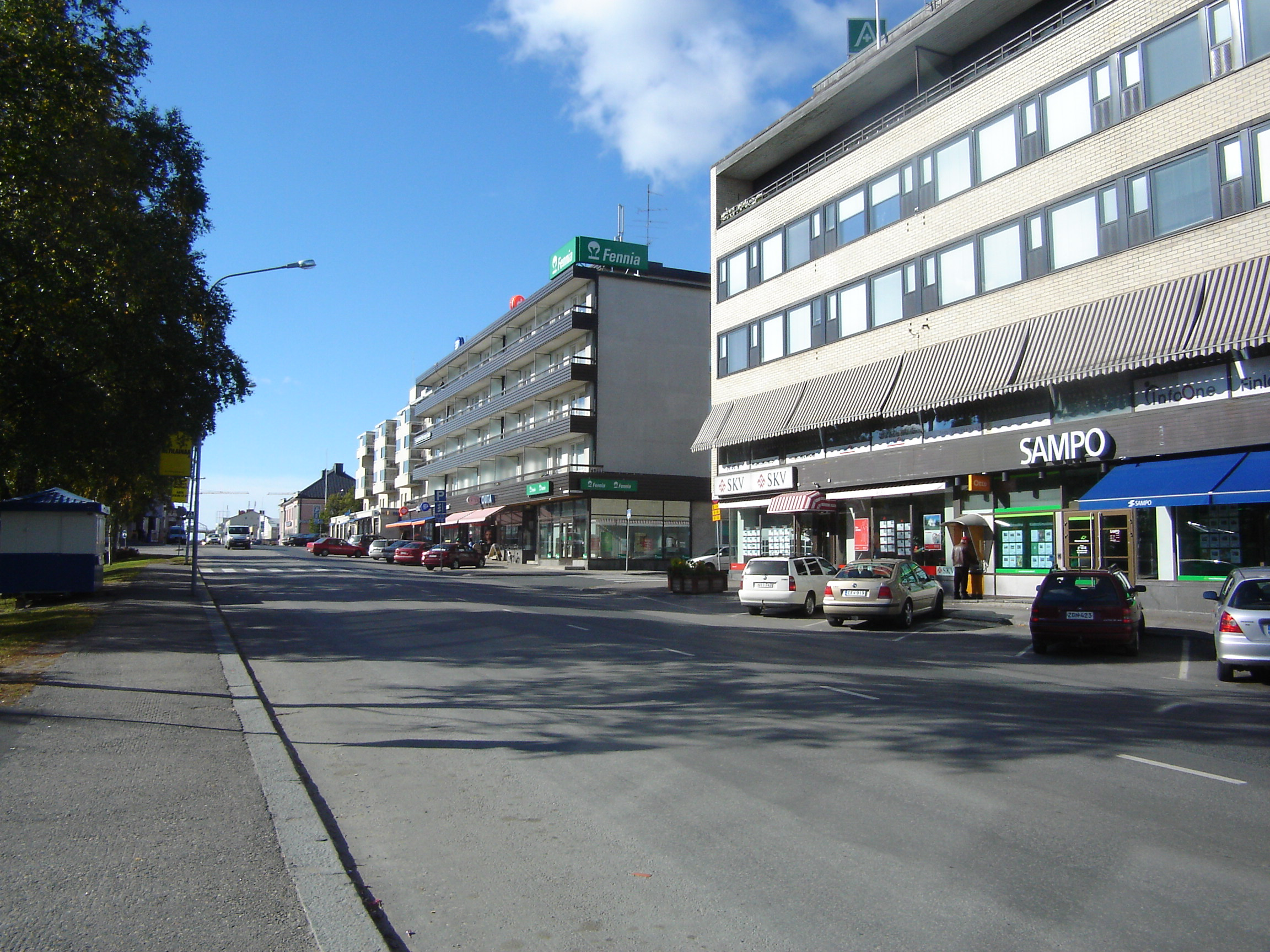
- Central Tornio

- Coat of arms

- Location of Tornio in Finland
- OpenStreetMap Interactive map outlining Tornio.
- Interactive map of Tornio
- Coordinates: 65°51′N 024°09′E
- Country: Finland
- Region: Lapland
- Sub-region: Kemi-Tornio
- Charter: 1621

Government
  - Town manager: Jukka Kujala

Area (2018-01-01)
  - Total: 1,348.83 km^{2} (520.79 sq mi)
  - Land: 1,188.71 km^{2} (458.96 sq mi)
  - Water: 161.59 km^{2} (62.39 sq mi)
  - Rank: 60th largest in Finland

Population (2025-12-31)
  - Total: 20,823
  - Rank: 50th largest in Finland
  - Density: 17.52/km^{2} (45.4/sq mi)

Population by native language
  - Finnish: 95% (official)
  - Swedish: 0.5%
  - Sami: 0.1%
  - Others: 4.5%

Population by age
  - 0 to 14: 16.9%
  - 15 to 64: 58.9%
  - 65 or older: 24.2%
- Time zone: UTC+02:00 (EET)
  - Summer (DST): UTC+03:00 (EEST)
- Website: www.tornio.fi/en/

Tornio (Finnish: [ˈtornio]; Swedish: Torneå; Northern Sami: Duortnus [ˈtuo̯rtnuːs]; Inari Sami: Tuárnus) is a city and municipality in Lapland, Finland. The city forms a cross-border twin city together with Haparanda on the Swedish side. The municipality covers an area of 1,348.83 square kilometres (520.79 sq mi), of which 161.59 km^{2} (62.39 sq mi) is water. The population density is 17.52 inhabitants per square kilometre (45.4/sq mi), with a total population of 20,823 (31 December 2025).

Tornio is unilingually Finnish with a negligible number of native Swedish speakers, although this does not count vast numbers of bilinguals who speak Swedish as a second language, with an official target of universal working bilingualism for both border municipalities.

== History ==
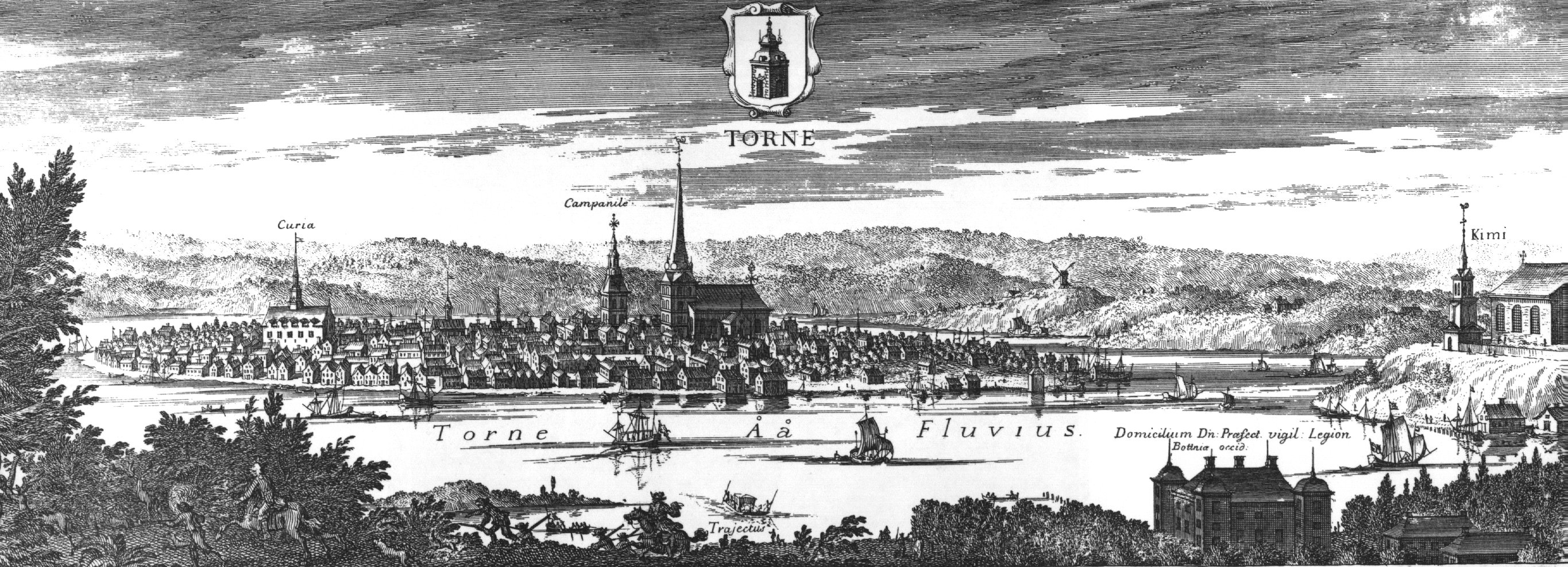
Torneå depicted in Suecia antiqua et hodierna

The delta of the Torne River has been inhabited since the end of the last ice age, and there are currently (1995) 16 settlement sites known in the area, similar to those found in Vuollerim (c. 6000–5000 BC). The Swedish part of the region is not far from the oldest permanent settlement site found in Scandinavia. A former hypothesis that this region was uninhabited and colonised from the Viking Age onward has now been abandoned.

Until the 19th century, inhabitants of the surrounding countryside spoke Finnish, and Kemi Sámi, a language of the Eastern Sami group, while those of the town were mainly Swedish-speaking.

The name 'Tornio' is an old Finnish word meaning "war spear": the city is named after the river. To Swedish it was borrowed as Torneå after Torne å, an alternative name of the river.

The town received its charter from the King Gustavus Adolphus on 12 May 1621, and was officially founded on the island of Suensaari. At that time, it was the northernmost city in the world. The charter was granted in recognition of Tornio being the hub of all trade in Lapland throughout the 16th century. It was the largest merchant town in the North at the time, and for some years ranked as the richest town in Sweden. Despite the lively trade with Lapland and overseas, the population of the town remained stable for hundreds of years at little over 500.

During the 18th century Tornio was visited by several expeditions from Central Europe which came to explore the Arctic. The most notable expedition (1736–1737) was led by a member of the Académie française, Pierre Louis Maupertuis, who came to take meridian arc measurements along the Torne Valley which would show that the globe is flattened towards the poles. The church spire at Tornio was one of the landmarks used by Maupertuis in his measurements. The church was constructed in 1686 by Matti Joosepinpoika Härmä.

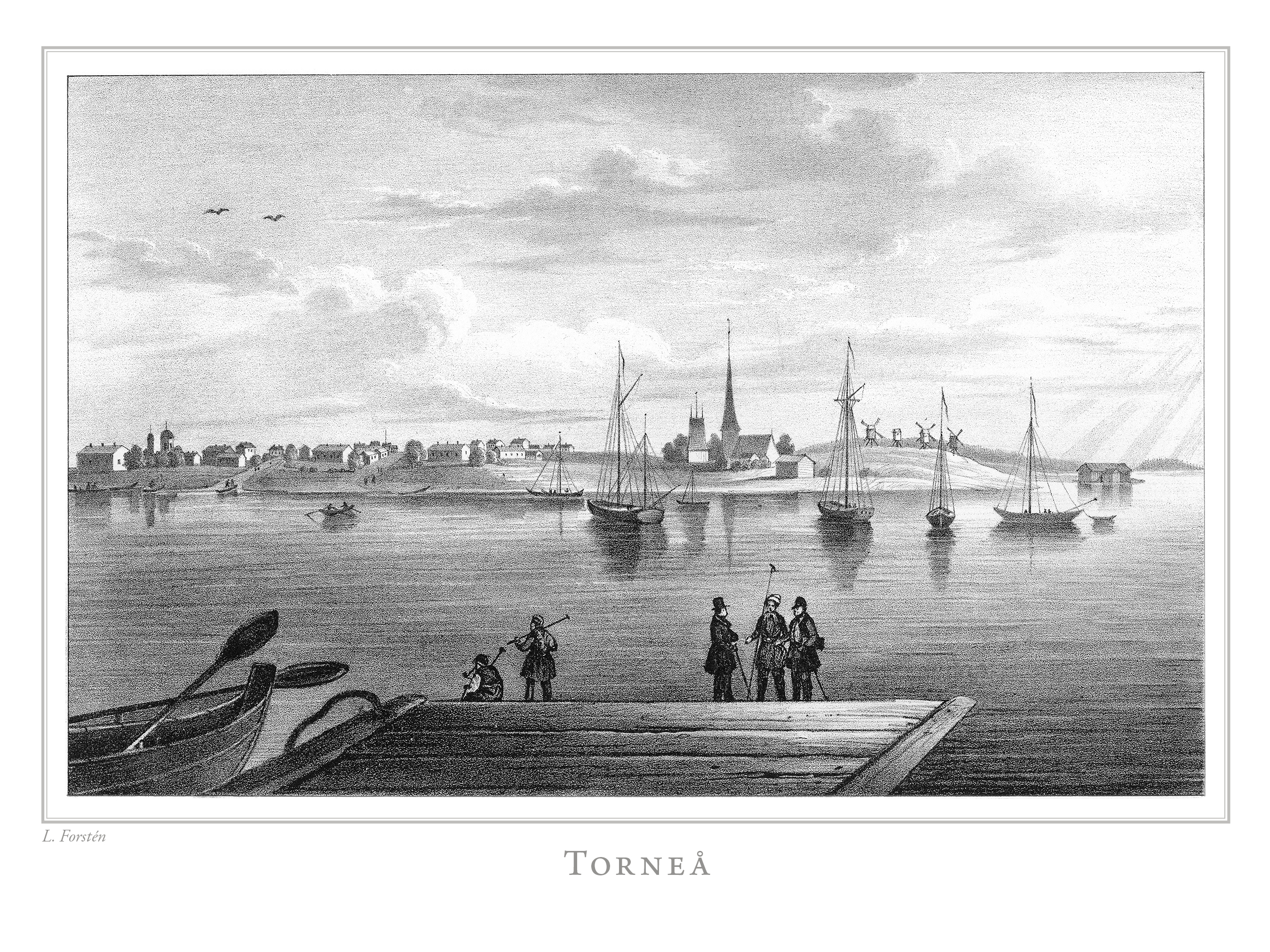
Illustration in Finland framstäldt i teckningar edited by Zacharias Topelius and published 1845-1852.

The Lapland trade on which Tornio depended started to decline in the 18th century, and the harbour had to be moved downriver twice as a result of the rising of the land, which made the river too shallow for navigation. However, the greatest blow to the wealth of the town came in the last war between Sweden and Russia in 1808, which saw the Russians capture and annex Finland. The border was drawn through the deepest channel of the Muonio and Tornio rivers, splitting Lapland into two parts, with deleterious effects on trade. Tornio ended up on the Russian side of the border by special request of the Russian czar. The Swedes developed the village of Haaparanta (present day Haparanda) on their side of the border, to balance the loss of Tornio, and Tornio became unilingually Finnish.

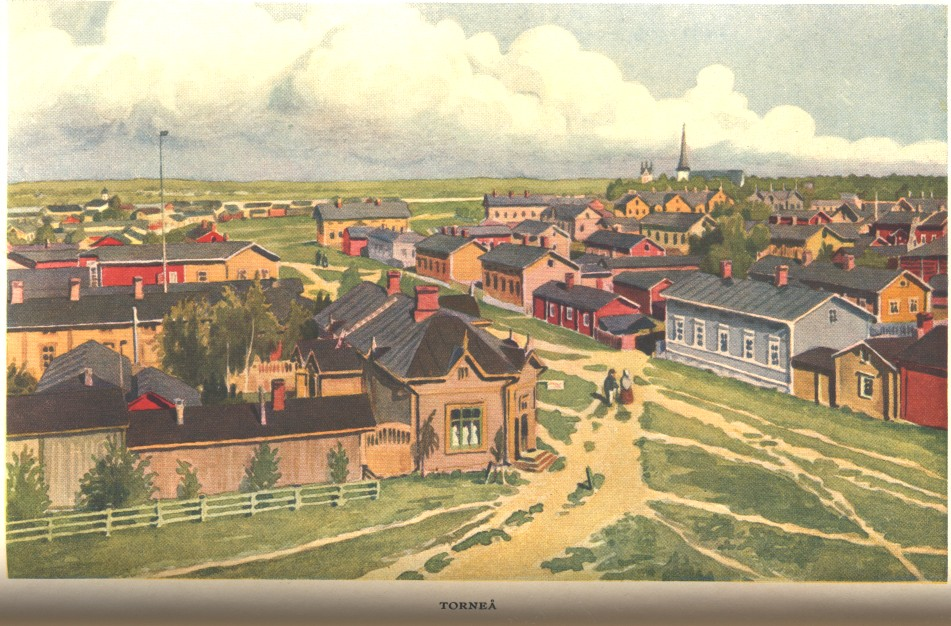
Tornio in 1908

During the Russian period, Tornio was a sleepy garrison town. Trade only livened up during the Åland War (part of the Crimean War) and the First World War, when Tornio became an important border crossing for goods and people. During the First World War, Tornio and Haparanda had the only rail link connecting the Russians to their Western allies. It was also through Tornio that Vladimir Lenin returned to Russia from exile in Switzerland in March 1917.

After the independence of Finland in 1917 Tornio lost its garrison and experienced further decline, although its population increased steadily. The town played no role of importance in the Finnish Civil War, but was the scene of some fierce street fighting at the onset of the Lapland War between Finland and Nazi Germany. The rapid liberation of the town by Finnish forces may have saved it from being burned down like so many other towns in Lapland. As a result, the wooden church from 1686 can still be seen today.

After World War II, the town created new employment built on the success of the local Lapin Kulta brewery and the Outokumpu stainless steel mill. Tourism based on the border has also been a growing industry. The town is a centre of education for Western Lapland, with a vocational college and a university of applied sciences.

Tornio and Haparanda have a history as twin cities, and are currently set to merge under the names TornioHaparanda and HaparandaTornio. A new city centre is under construction on the international border and several municipal services are shared. The towns also share a common golf course, situated astride the border. The IKEA store in Haparanda has signposting in Finnish as well as in Swedish, and all prices are signposted in two currencies.

== Sports ==
Tornion Palloveikot is a bandy club which plays in the Bandyliiga and has become Finnish bandy champion several times. They play their home matches in Haparanda, just on the other side of the Swedish border, which was the venue for games at the 2001 Bandy World Championship.

Tornion Pallo -47 is the main association football club in the city.

Teemu Tainio, a football player and manager, was born in Tornio.

Jesse Puljujärvi, an ice hockey player, lived his childhood in Tornio.

Ville Pokka, an ice hockey player, was born and raised in Tornio.

The Finland-Sweden border runs through the golf course at the west of the city.

== Climate ==
Tornio has a subarctic climate (Dfc) that is slightly tempered in winter by its proximity to the sea, but retains warm continental summers that are quite short. The weatherbox below is from neighbouring city Haparanda and operated by the Swedish Meteorological and Hydrological Institute. Despite the fact that Tornio experiences polar day for 13 days between 15 and 27 June, it does not experience polar night.

Climate data for Haparanda (adjacent to Tornio; 2002–2020; extremes since 1901)
Month	Jan	Feb	Mar	Apr	May	Jun	Jul	Aug	Sep	Oct	Nov	Dec	Year
Record high °C (°F)	8.4 (47.1)	8.0 (46.4)	11.8 (53.2)	18.5 (65.3)	28.8 (83.8)	31.4 (88.5)	33.6 (92.5)	31.1 (88.0)	24.0 (75.2)	17.0 (62.6)	11.5 (52.7)	7.2 (45.0)	33.6 (92.5)
Mean maximum °C (°F)	2.5 (36.5)	3.4 (38.1)	7.5 (45.5)	12.7 (54.9)	22.3 (72.1)	25.2 (77.4)	27.1 (80.8)	24.6 (76.3)	18.7 (65.7)	11.8 (53.2)	6.4 (43.5)	3.7 (38.7)	28.1 (82.6)
Mean daily maximum °C (°F)	−5.9 (21.4)	−5.1 (22.8)	−0.3 (31.5)	5.4 (41.7)	12.3 (54.1)	17.8 (64.0)	21.1 (70.0)	18.7 (65.7)	13.3 (55.9)	5.6 (42.1)	0.4 (32.7)	−2.4 (27.7)	6.7 (44.1)
Daily mean °C (°F)	−9.8 (14.4)	−9.1 (15.6)	−4.9 (23.2)	1.1 (34.0)	7.4 (45.3)	12.9 (55.2)	16.5 (61.7)	14.4 (57.9)	9.4 (48.9)	2.4 (36.3)	−2.4 (27.7)	−5.8 (21.6)	2.7 (36.8)
Mean daily minimum °C (°F)	−13.6 (7.5)	−13.1 (8.4)	−9.5 (14.9)	−3.3 (26.1)	2.5 (36.5)	8.0 (46.4)	11.8 (53.2)	10.1 (50.2)	5.5 (41.9)	−0.8 (30.6)	−5.1 (22.8)	−9.1 (15.6)	−1.4 (29.5)
Mean minimum °C (°F)	−27.6 (−17.7)	−27.3 (−17.1)	−22.3 (−8.1)	−12.1 (10.2)	−4.3 (24.3)	1.8 (35.2)	5.3 (41.5)	2.0 (35.6)	−2.5 (27.5)	−10.1 (13.8)	−16.0 (3.2)	−21.5 (−6.7)	−29.7 (−21.5)
Record low °C (°F)	−40.8 (−41.4)	−41.7 (−43.1)	−37.5 (−35.5)	−26.0 (−14.8)	−12.0 (10.4)	−2.0 (28.4)	0 (32)	−3.0 (26.6)	−9.0 (15.8)	−23.0 (−9.4)	−32.3 (−26.1)	−38.0 (−36.4)	−41.7 (−43.1)
Average precipitation mm (inches)	56.5 (2.22)	44.9 (1.77)	35.8 (1.41)	32.4 (1.28)	45.5 (1.79)	52.8 (2.08)	60.7 (2.39)	57.2 (2.25)	64.8 (2.55)	59.2 (2.33)	68.9 (2.71)	63.6 (2.50)	642.3 (25.28)
Average extreme snow depth cm (inches)	47 (19)	67 (26)	76 (30)	62 (24)	7 (2.8)	0 (0)	0 (0)	0 (0)	0 (0)	4 (1.6)	13 (5.1)	26 (10)	77 (30)
Source 1: SMHI Open Data
Source 2: SMHI Monthly Data

Climate data for Tornio (extremes 1993 -present, data from Liakka and Torppi)
Month	Jan	Feb	Mar	Apr	May	Jun	Jul	Aug	Sep	Oct	Nov	Dec	Year
Record high °C (°F)	7.0 (44.6)	7.2 (45.0)	10.5 (50.9)	16.9 (62.4)	28.8 (83.8)	31.9 (89.4)	31.2 (88.2)	31.8 (89.2)	24.6 (76.3)	15.8 (60.4)	9.6 (49.3)	6.8 (44.2)	31.9 (89.4)
Record low °C (°F)	−44.1 (−47.4)	−38.2 (−36.8)	−32.7 (−26.9)	−24.0 (−11.2)	−9.5 (14.9)	−2.5 (27.5)	0.2 (32.4)	−3.1 (26.4)	−8.7 (16.3)	−22.8 (−9.0)	−30.1 (−22.2)	−35.8 (−32.4)	−44.1 (−47.4)
Source: FMI open data

== Transport ==
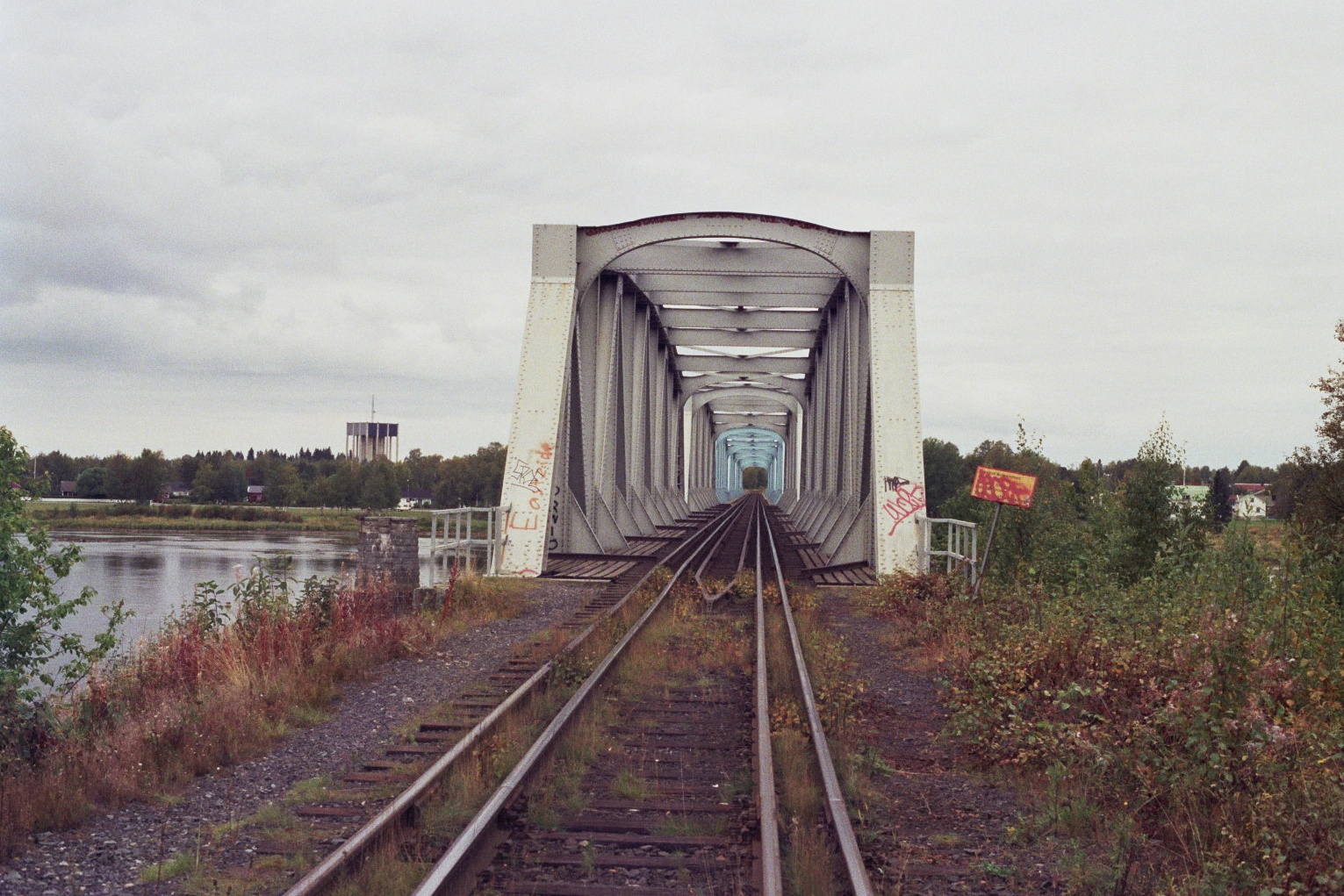
The Torne River Railway Bridge over Torne River with dual gauge tracks.

A break of gauge occurs at Tornio between the Finnish and Swedish railway systems. A bogie exchange and variable gauge axle track gauge changing facility are provided. Tornio has a passenger service provided from Tornio-East station by Finnish Railways VR three days a week overnight.

Kemi-Tornio Airport is located in Kemi, about 18 kilometres (11 mi) south-east from Tornio city centre.

The Port of Tornio is a cargo port adjacent to the Outokumpu steelworks.

Highway 29 (part of the European route E8) between Keminmaa and Tornio is the world's northernmost motorway. Tornio is also the northern terminus of European route E4.

== Notable people ==
- Aarne Heikinheimo, Jäger Major-General
- Antti Ekman, bandy player
- Einar Reuter, writer, art critic and painter
- Heikki Hyvönen, bandy player
- Heikki Niva, gymnast and snooker player
- Hemming Åström, businessman
- Henri Sillanpää, footballer
- Ivar Lantto, schoolteacher, farmer and politician
- Jarl Sundqvist, forester and long-term director of the Forestry Department in Lapland
- Jesse Puljujärvi, ice hockey player
- Joni Myllykoski, ice hockey player
- Juho-Teppo Berg, footballer
- Jukka Isometsä, ice hockey league judge
- Jussi Hakasalo, footballer
- Jussi Kanervo, hurdler
- Kai Sadinmaa, clergyman and writer
- Kalle Palander, alpine skier
- Kari Savio, writer
- Leena Huhta, sprinter
- Läjä Äijälä, musician, comics artist and poet
- Marko Herajärvi
- Mauno Saari, journalist, writer and screenwriter
- Paavo Ottelin, Jäger lieutenant
- Pasi Hiekkanen, football goalkeeper and bandy player
- Risto Mäkitalo, architect
- Saku Mäenalanen, ice hockey player
- Sari Eero, athlete
- Seppo Kanerva, politician
- Teemu Tainio, footballer
- Tuuli Matinsalo, aerobics athlete
- Ville Pokka, ice hockey player
- Vuokko Mattila, hairdresser
- Mira Sunnari, musician
- Ville Pörhölä, athlete, Olympic Winner
- Miranda Vuolasranta, Finnish teacher

== Twin towns – sister cities ==
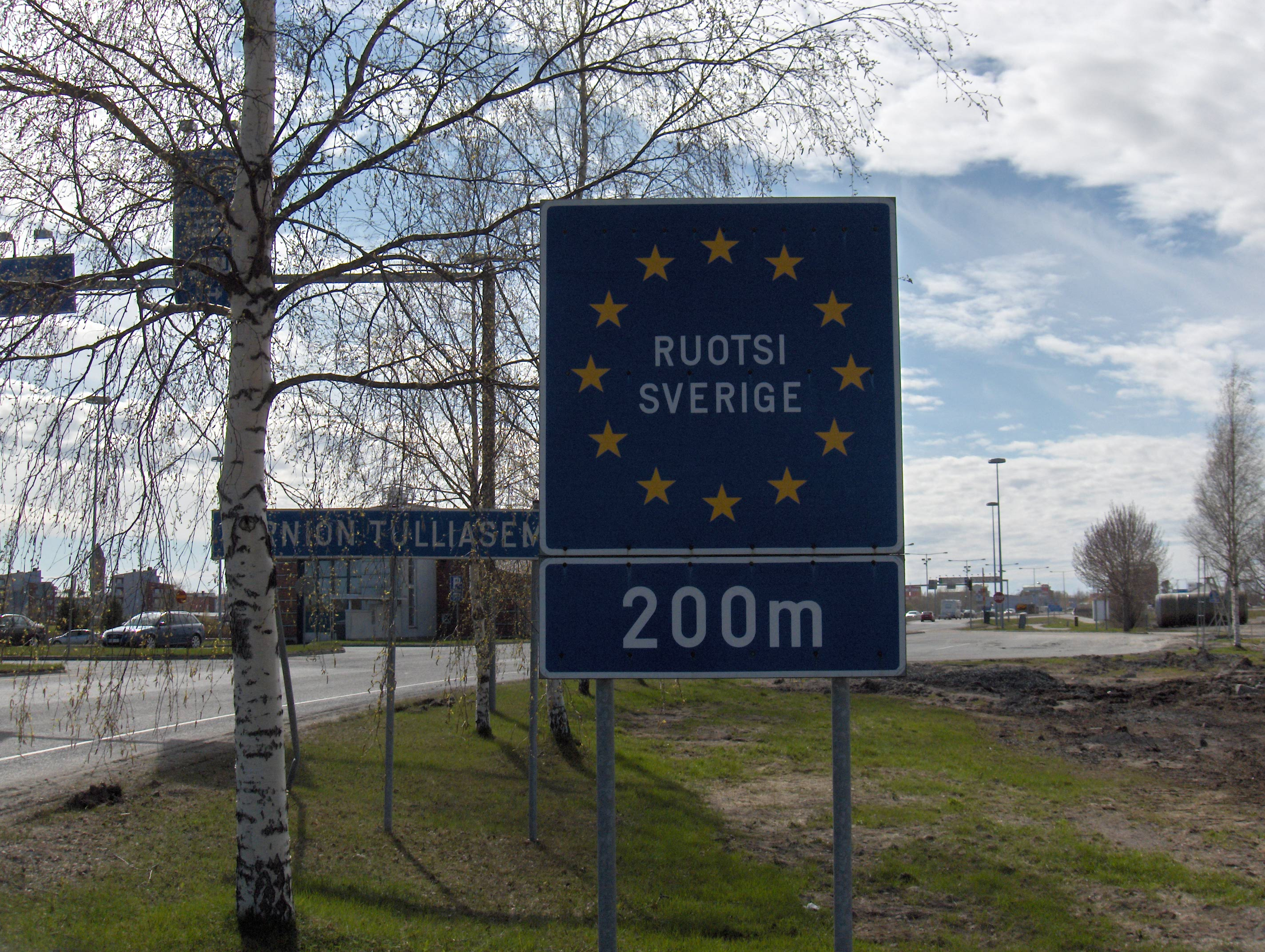
Bilingual Finnish/Swedish sign showing 200 metres until entering Sweden from Finland.

Tornio is twinned with:

- Devizes, England, United Kingdom
- Hammerfest, Norway
- Ikast-Brande, Denmark
- Kirovsk, Russia
- Szekszárd, Hungary
- Vetlanda, Sweden

== Gallery ==
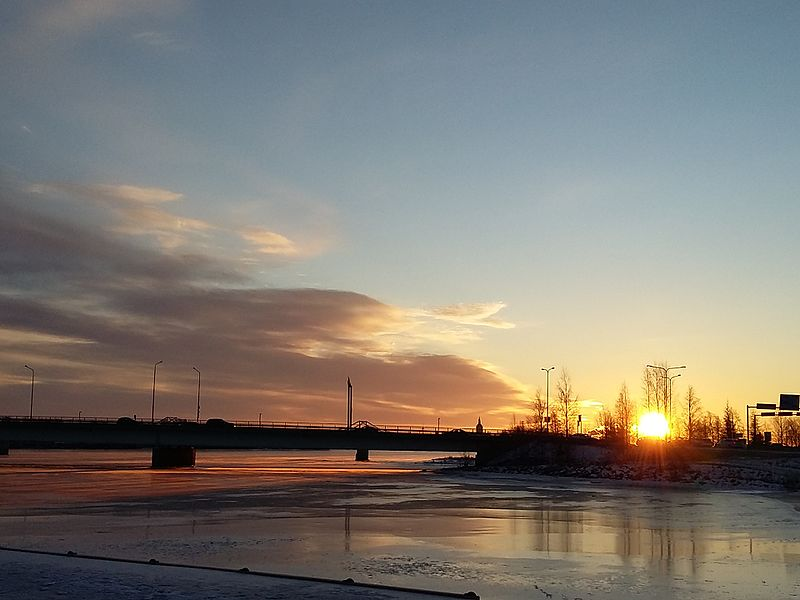
Torne River in the winter

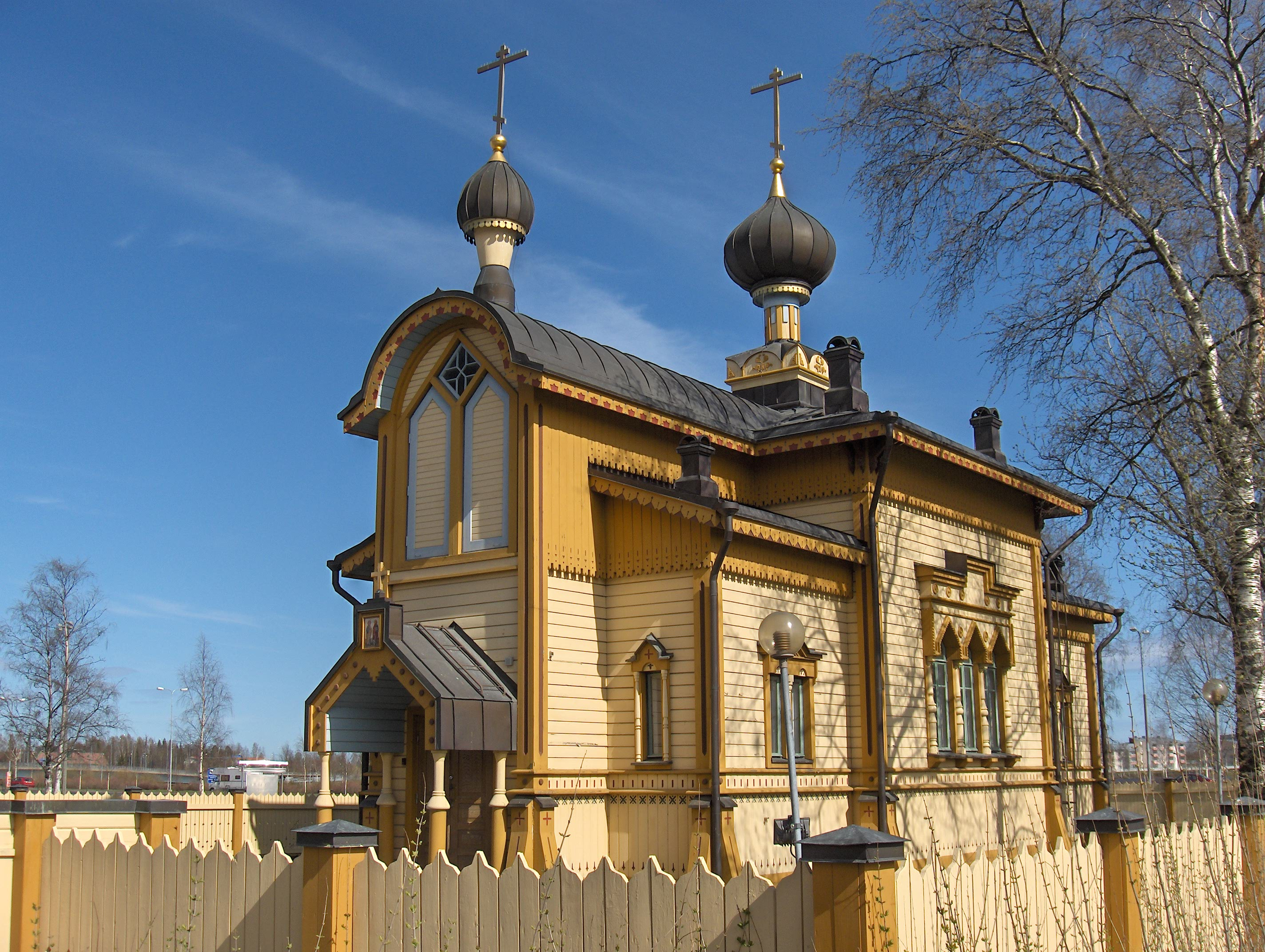
Orthodox Church, Tornio

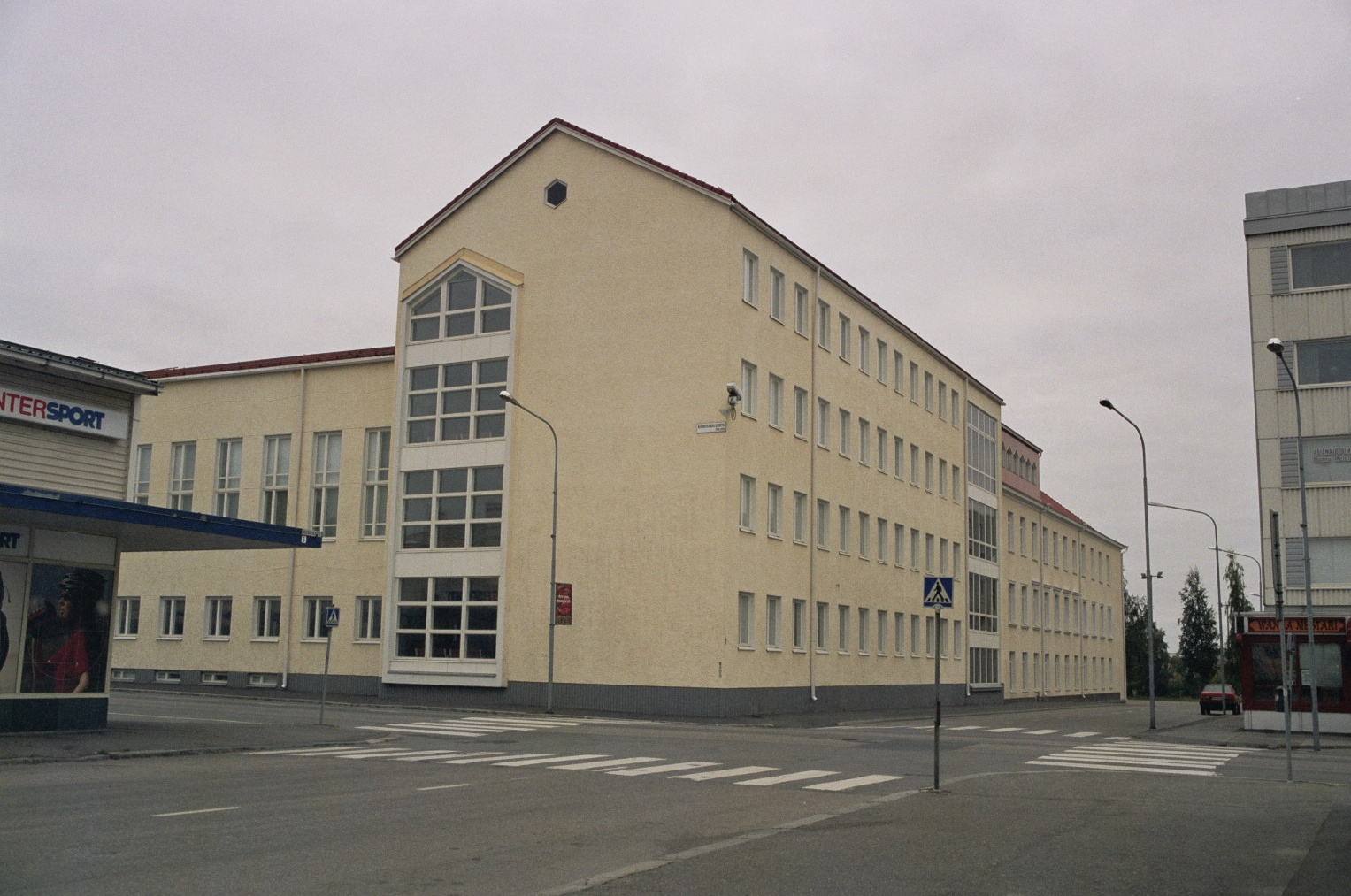
Suensaari School, constructed in the early 1900s originally a Russian barracks.

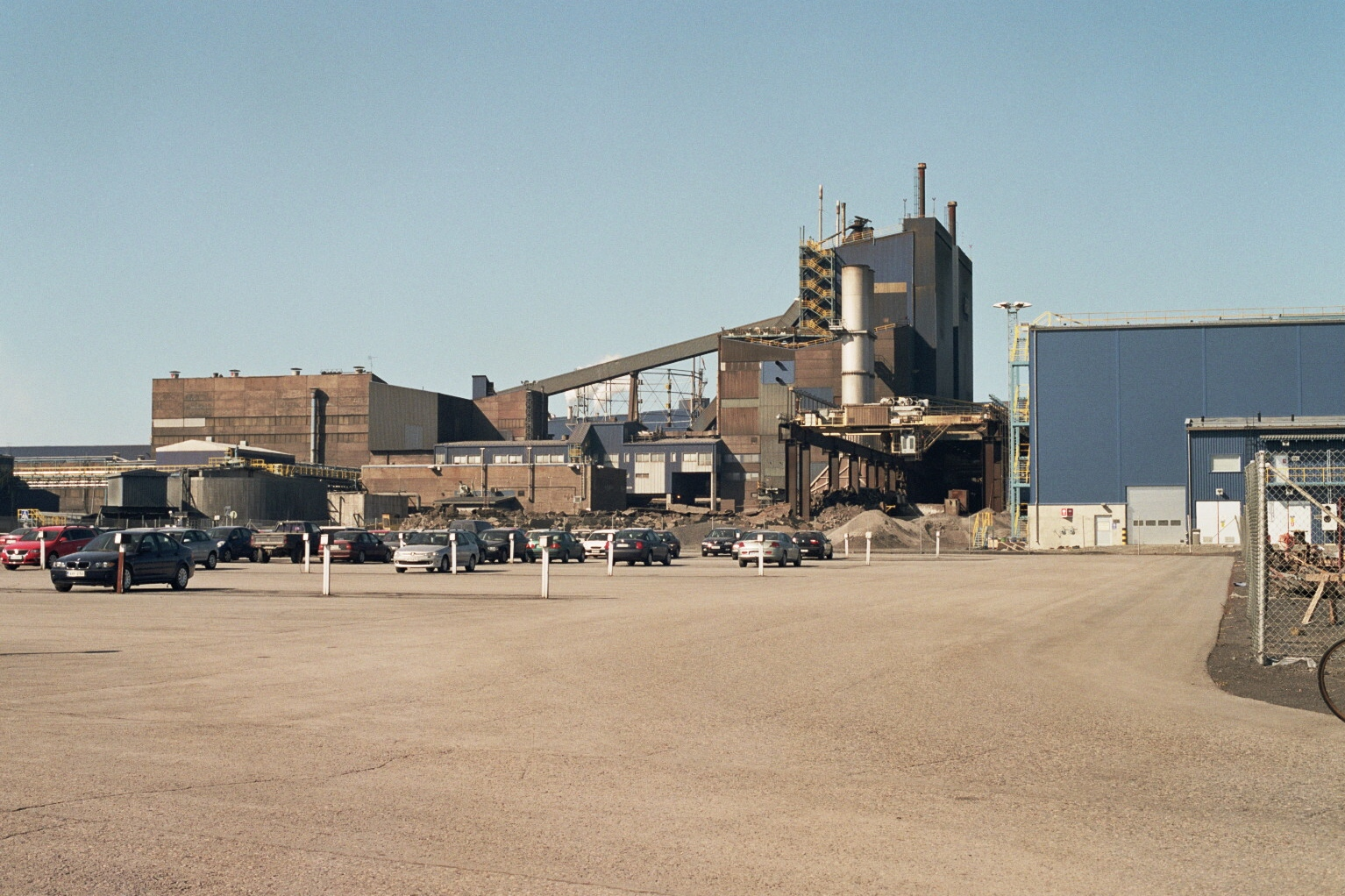
Outokumpu steel mill

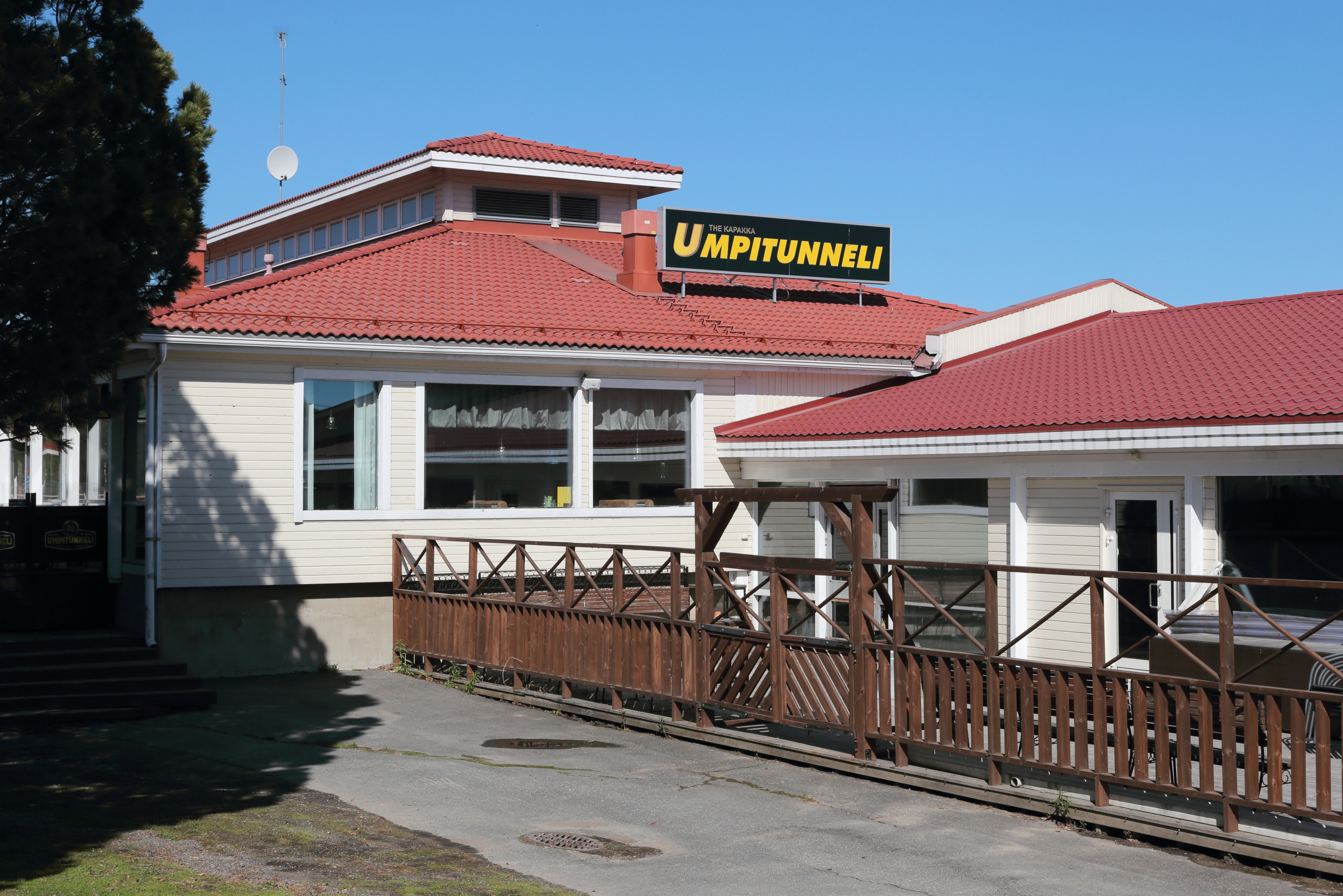
Bar Umpitunneli in Tornio

== See also ==
- Karunki (Finland)
- Haparanda (Sweden)
- Ylitornio (Finland)
- Övertorneå (Sweden)
