= Suensaari =

Coordinates: 65°51′06″N 24°08′31″E

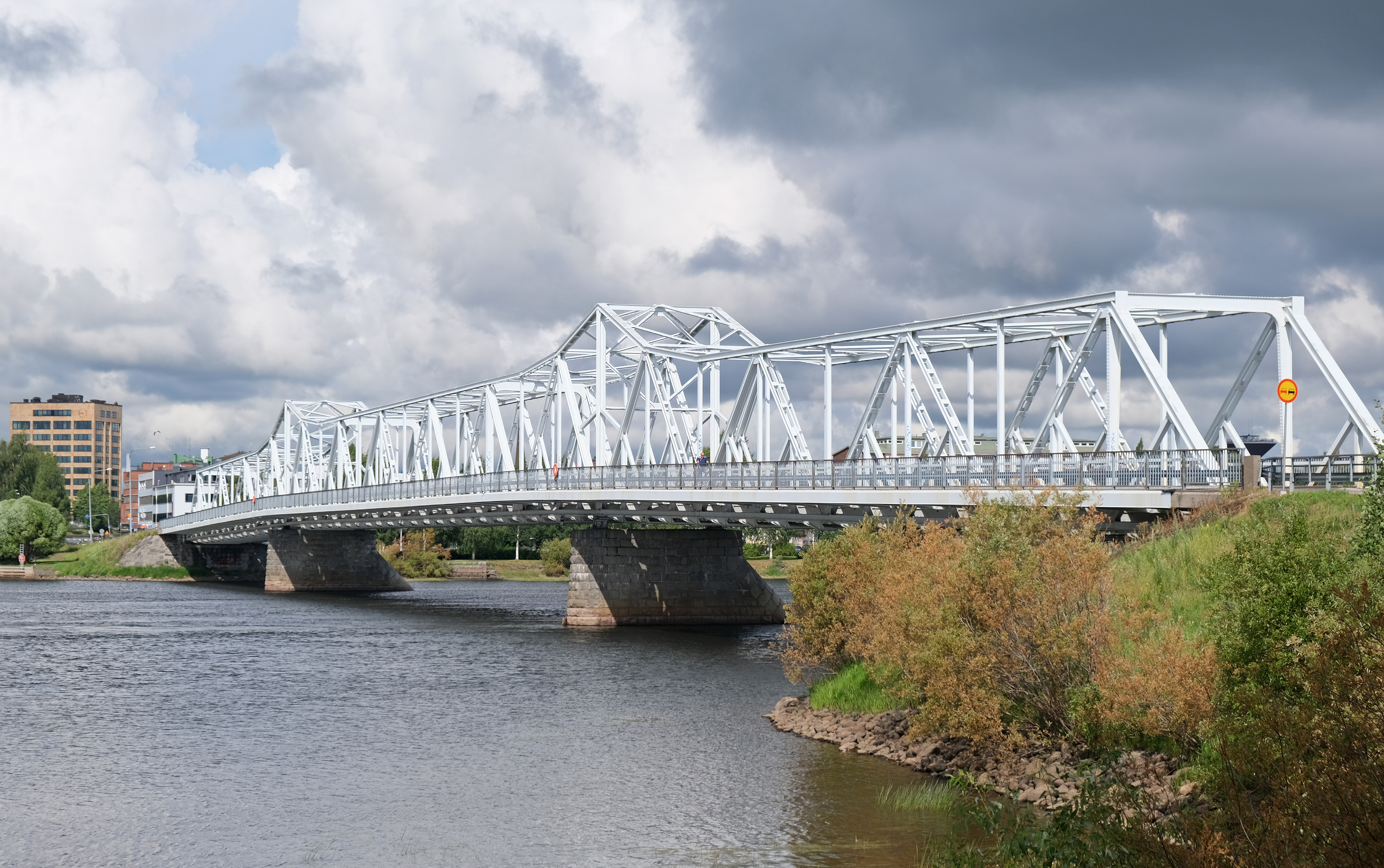
Hannula bridge between Suensaari and Tornio

Suensaari is a Finnish peninsula in the river Torne. Although the 6 km^{2} peninsula is linked to Sweden, it was decided in 1809 that it would become Finnish. It has 2227 inhabitants as of 2012.
