= List of Finnish writers =

A list of Finnish writers:

== A ==
- Marja-Sisko Aalto
- Uma Aaltonen
- Aapeli
- Kari Aartoma
- Umayya Abu-Hanna
- Aino Ackté
- Gösta Ågren
- Juhani Aho
- Aleksanteri Ahola-Valo
- Johan Jacob Ahrenberg
- Risto Ahti
- Outi Alanne
- Santeri Alkio
- Marianne Alopaeus
- Claes Andersson
- Tuuve Aro
- Adolf Ivar Arwidsson

== B ==
- Tapani Bagge
- Veijo Baltzar
- Maria Berg
- Kersti Bergroth
- Hassan Blasim
- Caj Bremer

== C ==
- Walter de Camp
- Minna Canth
- Kristina Carlson
- Bo Carpelan
- Fredrik Cygnaeus

== D ==
- Erik Dahlberg

== E ==
- Albert Eerola
- Adelaïde Ehrnrooth
- Michel Ekman
- Kari Enqvist
- Pekka Ervast

== F ==
- Monika Fagerholm
- Henrik Florinus
- Tua Forsström
- Peter Franzén
- Eino Friberg
- Hanna Frosterus-Segerstråle

== G ==
- Sami Garam
- Kaarina Goldberg
- Carl Axel Gottlund
- Karl Jacob Gummerus
- Hans Aslak Guttorm

== H ==
- Hilja Haapala
- Paavo Haavikko
- Lucina Hagman
- Simo Halinen
- Jouko Halmekoski
- Yrjö Halonen
- Helvi Hämäläinen
- Virpi Hämeen-Anttila
- Eero Hämeenniemi
- Eino Hanski
- Anna-Leena Härkönen
- Saima Harmaja
- Satu Hassi
- Pirjo Hassinen
- Vilho Helanen
- Linda Helenius
- Elina Hirvonen
- Pentti Holappa
- Anselm Hollo
- Johanna Holmström
- Kari Hotakainen
- Lars Huldén
- Hannele Huovi
- Veikko Huovinen
- Juha Hurme
- Antti Hyry

== I ==
- Jouni Inkala
- Risto Isomäki
- Emmi Itäranta

== J ==
- Olli Jalonen
- Pedar Jalvi
- Lars Jansson
- Tove Jansson
- Arvid Järnefelt
- Artturi Järviluoma
- Eeva Joenpelto
- Matti Yrjänä Joensuu
- Maria Jotuni
- Daniel Juslenius
- Helvi Juvonen

== K ==
- Sirpa Kähkönen
- Markus Kajo
- Hilda Käkikoski
- Aino Kallas
- Urho Karhumäki
- Kaarina Kari
- Elina Karjalainen
- Jussi Pekka Kasurinen
- Daniel Katz
- Kerttu Kauniskangas
- Anssi Kela
- Usko Kemppi
- Katja Kettu
- Ilmari Kianto
- Jyrki Kiiskinen
- Eeva Kilpi
- Volter Kilpi
- Marko Kitti
- Markku Kivinen
- Hanna Kokko
- Yrjö Kokko
- Lauri Kokkonen
- Vilho Koljonen
- Riku Korhonen
- Jorma Korpela
- Jukka Koskelainen
- Julius Krohn
- Leena Krohn
- Heli Kruger
- Kirsi Kunnas
- Matti Kurikka
- Janne Kuusi
- Stephen Kuusisto
- Tuomas Kyrö

== L ==
- Jarkko Laine
- Sinikka Laine
- Seppo Lampela
- Leena Lander
- Eeles Landström
- Martti Larni
- Joel Lehtonen
- Lasse Lehtinen
- Torsti Lehtinen
- Tuija Lehtinen
- Joel Lehtonen
- Eino Leino
- Santeri Levas
- Tommi Liimatta
- Rosa Liksom
- Aleko Lilius
- Lauri Linna
- Väinö Linna
- Johannes Linnankoski
- Katri Lipson
- Herbert Lomas
- Sven Lokka
- Elias Lönnrot
- Sami Lopakka
- Kiba Lumberg
- Reko Lundán
- Ulla-Lena Lundberg
- Hannu Luntiala
- Heikki Luoma

== M ==
- Hannu Mäkelä
- Aino Malmberg
- Eeva-Liisa Manner
- Juha Mannerkorpi
- Otto Manninen
- Auli Mantila
- Jarkko Martikainen
- David McDuff
- Arto Melleri
- Veijo Meri
- Aila Meriluoto
- Väinö Merivirta
- Marja-Leena Mikkola
- Timo K. Mukka

== N ==
- Arne Nevanlinna
- August Nordenskiöld
- Hj. Nortamo
- Gustaf von Numers
- M. A. Numminen
- Heikki Nurmio
- Mikaela Nyman
- Carita Nyström

== O ==
- Jorma Ojaharju
- Sofi Oksanen
- Aki Ollikainen
- Hagar Olsson
- Kreetta Onkeli

== P ==
- Arto Paasilinna
- Erno Paasilinna
- Reino Paasilinna
- Kalle Päätalo
- Olavi Paavolainen
- Kai Pahlman
- Pietari Päivärinta
- Teuvo Pakkala
- Raoul Palmgren
- Heikki Palmu
- Kirsti Paltto
- Timo Parvela
- Samuli Paulaharju
- Toivo Pekkanen
- Jyrki Pellinen
- Juhani Peltonen
- Eila Pennanen
- Arvi Pohjanpää
- Mike Pohjola
- Ursula Pohjolan-Pirhonen
- Mirjam Polkunen
- Kira Poutanen
- Riikka Pulkkinen
- Salomo Pulkkinen

== R ==
- Erkki Räikkönen
- Mirkka Rekola
- Gustaf Renvall
- Mikko Rimminen
- Susanne Ringell
- Fredrika Runeberg
- Johan Ludvig Runeberg
- Laura Ruohonen
- Juha Ruusuvuori
- Kaisu-Mirjami Rydberg

== S ==
- Pentti Saarikoski
- Asko Sahlberg
- Pirkko Saisio
- Hannu Salama
- Martta Salmela-Järvinen
- Arto Salminen
- Arvo Salo
- Kyösti Salokorpi
- Pentti Sammallahti
- Mauri Sariola
- Jalmari Sauli
- Roman Schatz
- Raija Siekkinen
- Frans Emil Sillanpää
- Kirsti Simonsuuri
- Helena Sinervo
- Johanna Sinisalo
- Yrjö Sirola
- Anja Snellman
- J. V. Snellman
- Edith Södergran
- Yrjö Soini
- Lauri Soininen
- Johnny Spunky
- Katariina Souri
- Pajtim Statovci
- Eira Stenberg
- Nils-Börje Stormbom
- Alpo Suhonen
- Lars Sund
- Klaus Suomela
- Aatto Suppanen

== T ==
- Marton Taiga
- Maila Talvio
- Jari Tervo
- Ilpo Tiihonen
- Eeva Tikka
- Henrik Tikkanen
- Märta Tikkanen
- Jarkko Tontti
- Jouko Turkka
- Sirkka Turkka
- Heikki Turunen
- Antti Tuuri
- Jukka Tyrkkö

== U ==
- Algot Untola
- Kaari Utrio
- Meri Utrio

== V ==
- Hannu Väisänen
- Ilkka Vartiovaara
- Kosti Vehanen
- Lauri Viita
- Uljas Vikström
- Tapio Vilpponen
- Juha Vuorinen

== W ==
- Sara Wacklin
- Edvin Wahlstén
- Mika Waltari
- Thomas Warburton
- Helena Westermarck
- Kjell Westö
- Sigurd Wettenhovi-Aspa

== Y ==
- Yrjö Sakari Yrjö-Koskinen

== Z ==
- Konni Zilliacus

== See also ==
- List of Finnish women writers
- Writers in Finland 1809–1916
- Writers in Finland 1809–1916

== Bibliography ==
- "List of Authors and contributors". Books from Finland.
