= List of Finnish women writers =

This is a list of women writers who were born in Finland or whose writings are closely associated with the country.

== A ==
- Uma Aaltonen (1940–2009), author, journalist, politician
- Umayya Abu-Hanna (born 1961), Palestinian-born novelist, journalist
- Susanna Alakoski (born 1962), novelist, author of Svinalängorna, filmed as Beyond
- Outi Alanne (born 1967), novelist using the pen name NeitiNaru
- Marianne Alopaeus (1918–2014), novelist, published in Swedish
- Tuuve Aro (born 1973), novelist, short story writer, children's writer, several English translations
- Isa Asp (1853–1872), poet

== B ==
- Kersti Bergroth (1886–1975), novelist, poet, playwright, children's story writer, wrote in both Swedish and Finnish
- Christina Regina von Birchenbaum, Finland's earliest female poet writing her autobiographical Een Annor Ny wijsa in 1651
- Anni Blomqvist (1909–1990), Swedish-language novelist, several autobiographical works

== C ==
- Minna Canth (1844–1897), important figure in Finnish literature, playwright, novelist, short story writer, addressed women's rights
- Kristina Carlson (born 1949), novelist, poet, journalist
- Fredrika Wilhelmina Carstens (1808–1888), writer, the author of the first novel published in Finland
- Inga-Brita Castrén (1919–2003), theologian

== E ==
- Anna Edelheim (1845–1902), journalist
- Adelaïde Ehrnrooth (1826–1905), novelist, poet, short story writer, feminist
- Elsa Enäjärvi-Haavio (1901–1951), folklorist and educator

== F ==
- Tua Forsström (born 1947), Swedish-language poet, translated into English
- Maikki Friberg (1861–1927), educator, writer, journal editor, suffragist and peace activist

== G ==
- Kaarina Goldberg (born 1956), children's writer, also comic strips

== H ==
- Hilja Haapala, pen name of Hilja Dagmar Janhonen (1877–1958), novelist
- Lucina Hagman (1853–1946), feminist, biographer
- Helinä Häkkänen-Nyholm (born 1971), forensic psychologist
- Helvi Hämäläinen (1907–1998), prolific novelist, short story writer, poet
- Virpi Hämeen-Anttila (born 1958), best-selling novelist, translator, non-fiction writer, educator
- Anne Hänninen (born 1958), poet, essayist
- Anna-Leena Härkönen (born 1965), novelist, actress, works adapted for the theatre and television
- Saima Harmaja (1913–1937), poet, known for her tragic life and early death
- Satu Hassi (born 1951), politician, environmentalist, novelist, poet, essayist
- Pirjo Hassinen (born 1957), novelist, works translated into several languages
- Anna-Liisa Hirviluoto (1929–2000), archaeologist, non-fiction writer
- Laila Hirvisaari, also Laila Hietamies (1938–2021), best-selling novelist, short story writer, playwright
- Elina Hirvonen (born 1975), novelist, journalist, author of Että hän muistaisi saman, translated as When I Forgot
- Sofia Hjärne (1780–1860), early Swedish-language novelist, held literary salons
- Johanna Holmström (born 1981), short story writer, novelist, writes in Swedish

== I ==
- Lempi Ikävalko (1901–1994), poet, journalist, latterly in the United States

== J ==
- Tove Jansson (1914–2001), versatile Swedish-language novelist, comic strip writer, children's writer, painter
- Eeva Joenpelto (1921–2004), productive novelist, educator
- Maria Jotuni (1880–1943), novelist, playwright, short-story writer

== K ==
- Sirpa Kähkönen (born 1964), novelist, author of the Kuopio series of historical novels
- Elina Kahla (born 1960), philologist, essayist, non-fiction writer
- Hilda Käkikoski (1864–1912), politician, children's writer, historian
- Aino Kallas (1878–1956), novelist, short story writer, revered contributor to Finnish literature, some works translated into English
- Tuula Kallioniemi (born 1951), prolific writer of novels and short stories for children and young adults
- Kaarina Kari (1888–1982), physician, gymnastics teacher and writer
- Irma Karvikko (1909–1994), journalist, politician
- Eeva Kilpi (1928–2026), novelist, poet, known for feminist humour, poetry translated into English
- Ella Kivikoski (1901–1990), archaeologist, non-fiction writer
- Leena Krohn (born 1947), novelist, works translated into several languages including English
- Kirsi Kunnas (1924–2021), poet, children's writer, playwright, translator, some works translated into English

== L ==
- Sinikka Laine (born 1945), novelist, short story writer, writer of young adult fiction
- Leena Lander (born 1955), successful novelist, works translated into several languages including English
- Tuija Lehtinen (born 1954), journalist, novelist, works translated into several languages
- Leena Lehtolainen (born 1964), widely translated crime fiction writer
- Anne Leinonen (born 1973), novelist, science fiction and fantasy
- Rosa Liksom (born 1958), novelist, short story writer, children's writer, artist
- Irmelin Sandman Lilius (born 1936), writer of picture books and novels for children as well as books for adults and poetry
- Minna Lindgren (born 1963), journalist, since 2013 a successful crime-fiction novelist
- Marita Lindquist (1918–2016), children's writer, novelist, songwriter, poet
- Fredrika Lovisa Lindqvist (1786–1841), writer
- Katri Lipson (born 1965), novelist
- Kiba Lumberg (born 1956), novelist, screenwriter for television
- Ulla-Lena Lundberg (born 1947), Swedish-language writer, non-fiction, travel, often autobiographical novels

== M ==
- Eeva-Liisa Manner (1921–1995), modernist poet, playwright, translator, poems translated into English
- Marja-Leena Mikkola (born 1939), novelist, short story writer, poet, songwriter, satirist, translator
- Barbara Catharina Mjödh (1738–1776), poet
- Eva Moltesen (1871–1934), Finnish-Danish writer and peace activist
- Agatha Lovisa de la Myle (1724–1787), poet, wrote in German and Latvian

== N ==
- Mikaela Nyman (born 1966), novelist, poet, journalist and editor published in Swedish and English
- Carita Nyström (1940–2019), Swedish-speaking writer and feminist

== O ==
- Sofi Oksanen (born 1977), best-selling novelist, playwright, internationally recognized through her play Puhdistus, translated as Purge
- Hagar Olsson (1893–1978), expressionist novelist, playwright, critic, translator

== P ==
- Kirsti Paltto (born 1947), Sámi author, children's writer, poet, short story writer, playwright, works translated into several languages
- Eila Pennanen (1916–1994), novelist, critic, translator
- Kira Poutanen (born 1974), novelist, translator, actress
- Helvi Poutasuo (1943–2017), Finnish Sami teacher, translator and newspaper editor
- Riikka Pulkkinen (born 1980), widely translated, novelist, columnist

== R ==
- Elsa Rautee (1897–1987), poet, songwriter
- Mirkka Rekola (1931–2014), highly acclaimed poet, writer of aphorisms
- Susanne Ringell (born 1955), short story writer
- Hanna Rönnberg (1862–1946), painter and writer
- Fredrika Runeberg (1807–1879), novelist, pioneer of Finnish historical fiction, wife of national poet Johan Ludvig Runeberg
- Kaisu-Mirjami Rydberg (1905–1959), journalist, newspaper editor, poet, non-fiction writer, politician

== S ==
- Pirkko Saisio (born 1949), prolific versatile writer, playwright, novelist, screenwriter
- Sally Salminen (1906–1976), Swedish-language novelist, author of Katrina
- Solveig von Schoultz (1907–1996), Swedish-language poet, novelist, dramatist
- Raija Siekkinen (1953–2004), short story writer, novelist, children's writer
- Maria Simointytär, first Finnish-language poet, published Orpolapsen vaikerrus in 1683
- Salla Simukka (born 1981), successful young adults author, name a name with The Snow White Trilogy
- Helena Sinervo (born 1961), poet, poetry translator, novelist, songwriter
- Johanna Sinisalo (born 1958), science-fiction writer, author of Ennen päivänlaskua ei voi translated as Not Before Sundown
- Anja Snellman (born 1954), widely translated novelist, poet, journalist, her Pet Shop Girls appeared in English in 2013
- Edith Södergran (1892–1923), widely acclaimed Swedish-language modernist poet, translated into English
- Katariina Souri (born 1968), novelist
- Eira Stenberg (born 1943), poet, children's writer, novelist
- Anni Swan (1875–1958), children's writer for girls, journalist and translator
- Catharina Charlotta Swedenmarck (1744–1813), Swedish-language poet, playwright, remembered for her pioneering play Dianas fest

== T ==
- Maila Talvio (1871–1951), playwright, short story writer, novelist
- Eeva Tikka (born 1939), novelist
- Märta Tikkanen (born 1935), Swedish-language novelist, journalist, author of Manrape
- Aale Tynni (1913–1997), poet, translator, editor

== U ==
- Kaari Utrio (born 1942), historical novelist, historian
- Arja Uusitalo (born 1951), poet, journalist

== V ==
- Katri Vala (1901–1944), poet, critic, attacked war and Fascism
- Anja Vammelvuo (1921–1988), poet and writer
- Marja-Liisa Vartio (1924–1966), poet and prose writer
- Monica Vikström-Jokela (born 1960), children's writer, television script writer
- Kerttu Vuolab (born 1951), Sami-language novelist, songwriter, translator

== W ==
- Sara Wacklin (1790–1846), Swedish-language writer, author of the successful novel Hundrade minnen från Österbotten (A Hundred Memories of Ostrobothnia)
- Helena Westermarck (1857–1938), artist, Swedish-language women's historian, biographer, novelist
- Sara Wesslin (born 1991), Finnish Sami journalist, supporter of the Skolt Sami language
- Hella Wuolijoki (1886–1954), Estonian-born Finnish-language novelist, politician, used the pen name Juhani Tervapää

== See also ==
- List of Finnish authors
- List of women writers
- Writers in Finland 1809–1916
