= Aartoma =

Origin
- Language: Finnish

Aartoma or Aartomaa is a Finnish surname. Notable people with the surname include:

- Kari Aartoma (1958–2024), Finnish writer
- Tapani Aartomaa (1934–2009), Finnish graphic designer
- Ulla Aartomaa (born 1949), Finnish art writer and curator
