= Kivinen =

Kivinen is a Finnish surname. Notable people with the surname include:

- Lauri Kivinen (born 1961), former CEO of the Finnish Broadcasting Company
- Markku Kivinen (born 1951), Finnish sociologist
- S. Albert Kivinen (1933–2021), Finnish philosopher
- Taru Kivinen, Finnish curler
- Timo Kivinen (born 1959), Finnish general
