= Gennady Muravin =

Russian translator and journalist (1931–2021)

Gennady L’vovich Muravin (Геннадий Львович Муравин; 14 May 1931 – 8 November 2021) was a Russian translator, journalist and artist, who lived and worked mostly in Estonia and Finland.

== Early life ==
Muravin was born in Belgorod in the Soviet Union, but he grew up in Kharkiv, Ukraine. His father was a well-known sculptor. During the Second World War, the family was evacuated to Alma-Ata.

== Education ==
Muravin graduated as an artist in 1957 from Moscow's Surikov Academy of Fine Arts, which was part of the Russian Academy of Arts. Later he also graduated from the Estonian Academy of Arts, majoring in painting.

== Working career ==
Muravin worked as a journalist in the All-Union Radio, and then in various magazines and children's magazines. While he was working in a magazine named Moskva, the magazine managed to publish the novel The Master and Margarita by Mikhail Bulgakov.

During 1976–79 he worked in the Russian Theatre, Tallinn, Estonia, as a director of literature. From the 1960s, he translated more than 150 titles of Estonian literature into Russian language. From the 1970s on, he translated also Finnish literature into Russian.

Muravin also worked in Tallinnfilm, where he wrote the screenplay for the documentary film "See on täiesti tõsine asi" (‘This is a completely serious thing’) (1982). He also wrote the screenplay for the films "Tuli öös" (1973), "Röövpüüdjajaht" (1975), "Aeg elada, aeg armastada" (1976) ja "Jõulud Vigalas" (1980). In the last mentioned film, he also played a character call Schmidt, who was an officer.

In 2016 he published a book in Estonian called "Ebatsensuursed juhtumid: Sekeldused eesti raamatutega nõukogude ajal" (‘Uncensored cases: confusions in Estonian books in the Soviet times’). In it, he describes the absurd fates of Estonian and Russian writers and their books in the Soviet Union and its censorship organizations. At the time of his death, he was finishing a sequel to the book.

As an artist he provided illustrations to various books, e.g. by Leo Tolstoy (Stories, 1961), and by Sergey Aksakov (Flowers as red as fire), and he also drew cartoons. He also drew caricatures for Ivan Krylov's work Selected Writings (Eesti Riiklik Kirjastus, 1960). He also designed wrappings for pralines.

Muravin married a Finnish woman in 1979 and was then able to visit Finland for the first time. Around that time, he learned the Finnish language, and began to translate Finnish literature into Russian. Among the authors he translated were Aino Kallas, Joel Lehtonen, Antti Tuuri, Eino Säisä, Eeva-Liisa Manner and F. E. Sillanpää. For a book by Sillanpää, the State of Finland donated two train wagons full of paper.

In the 1980s, Muravin began to assist the Finnish newspaper Helsingin Sanomat. At that time he was able to get a telephone at his apartment. Later, when the paper established an office in the centre of Tallinn, it was located in a small apartment rented from Muravin.

When Estonia became independent again, the writers’ guild of the country recommended that Muravin be given citizenship, “for his exemplary services to the Estonian country”.

== Later life and death ==
In 1991, Muravin got a permanent residence permit in Finland, and he now moved to Helsinki. He began to report on Finnish affairs to Tallinn and Moscow newspapers and radio channels and to Radio Free Europe as well.

During his last 20 years, he lived in Helsinki, and occasionally he lectured at the University of Helsinki, to the students of Russian and East European studies, e.g. on “Soviet Reality”. During these lectures he would e.g. tell the students of elections in the Soviet Union: it was possible to cast a ballot against the only candidate, but then one had to walk across the voting hall and cast one's vote in a special ballot box, so everyone would know that this person voted against the candidate. Also it was possible to cast an absentee ballot, for which one could obtain a certificate, so that a Moscow person could cast his vote in e.g. Vladivostok. But in Leonid Brezhnev’s constituency this was not permitted, and the reason turned out to be that so many people have requested the absentee ballot certificate and had not voted at all that it was embarrassing for the candidate.

Muravin was a member of the writers’ guild in the Soviet Union and in Estonia, and he was also a member of the Finnish Association of Translators and Interpreters.

He died in Helsinki on 8 November 2021, at the age of 90.
