= Hassinen =

Hassinen is a Finnish surname. Notable people with the surname include:

- Ami Hassinen, Finnsih musician from Nemesis
- Maija Hassinen-Sullanmaa, Finnish ice hockey player and coach
- Pirjo Hassinen (born 1957), Finnish writer

== See also ==
- Hassi
