= Institut national de la statistique et de l'analyse économique =

National institute of Benin

The Institut national de la statistique et de l'analyse économique (INSAE) is a national institute of Benin, which is dedicated to collecting data in the country. It collects data on demographics, population, climatology, education, employment, etc.
