= Wahlsten =

Wahlsten may refer to:

== People ==
- Douglas Wahlsten (born 1943), Canadian neuroscientist and psychologist
- Edvin Wahlstén (1872–1945), Finnish journalist and civil servant
- Kauko Wahlsten (1923–2001), Finnish rower
- Juhani Wahlsten (born 1938), Finnish ice hockey player
- Sami Wahlsten (born 1967), Finnish ice hockey player
