= Hasnie =

Hasnie is a surname. Notable people with the surname include:

- Aishah Hasnie (born 1984), American television journalist
- Shujaat Ali Hasnie (1905–?), Pakistani banker

== See also ==
- Hassie
