= Markku =

Markku is a given name. Notable people with the name include:

- Markku Alén (born 1951), Finnish former rally and race car driver
- Markku Aro (born 1950), Finnish singer who performed on Eurovision contest in 1971
- Markku Huhtamo (born 1946), Finnish actor
- Markku Into (1945–2018), legend of Finnish poetry, member in Finnish 1960s underground movement of Turku
- Markku Kanerva (born 1964), Finnish football manager and former player
- Markku Kivinen (born 1951), professor of sociology and a director of the Aleksanteri Institute
- Markku Komonen (born 1945), Finnish architect
- Markku Koski (born 1981), professional snowboarder from Sievi, Finland
- Markku Kukkoaho (born 1946), Finnish sprinter
- Markku Kyllönen (born 1962), retired professional ice hockey player
- Markku Lehmuskallio (born 1938), Finnish film director, cinematographer and screenwriter
- Markku Luolajan-Mikkola, Finnish baroque cellist and viol player
- Markku Niinimäki, Finnish Paralympian athlete competing mainly in category F54 shot put and javelin events
- Markku Pölönen (born 1957), Finnish film director, screenwriter, editor, owner of film production company Suomen Filmiteollisuus
- Markku Peltola (1956–2007), Finnish actor and musician
- Markku Pusenius (born 1964), Finnish ski jumper who competed from 1981 to 1986
- Markku Salminen (1946–2004), Finnish orienteering competitor
- Markku Slawyk (born 1962), former field hockey player from West Germany
- Markku Taskinen (born 1952), Finnish runner
- Markku Toikka (born 1955), Finnish stand-up comedian and actor
- Markku Tuokko (1951–2015), retired Finnish discus thrower and shot putter
- Markku Uusipaavalniemi (born 1966), Finnish curler and politician
