= Spunky =

Spunky may refer to:

== Fictional characters ==
- Spunky (Rocko's Modern Life)
- Spunky, a character from Hunky and Spunky
- Spunky, a character from The Adventures of Spunky and Tadpole
- Spunky, a character from Pac-Mania

== Music ==
- Spunky (album), by Monty Alexander, 1965
- "Spunky", a song by Bob James from the 1982 album Hands Down
- "Spunky", a song by Eels from the 1996 album Beautiful Freak

== See also ==
- Spunk (disambiguation)
- Johnny Spunky (b. 1958), Finnish musician, songwriter and author
