= Outi =

Outi may refer to:

- Outi (name), a Finnish female given name
- Oud, a Greek musical instrument sometimes referred to by its Greek name Outi
