= Hassie =

Hassie may refer to:

- Hassie McCoy, a fictional character
- Hassie Young (1924–2020), Canadian ice hockey player
- Hassie Harrison (born 1990), American actress

== See also ==
- Brice Assie (born 1983), Ivorian-French basketball player
- Hasse
- Hassi
- Hassy
