= Outi (name) =

Outi is a Finnish female given name, of Karelian and Eastern Finnish origin.

It became popular around the middle of the 20th century, and it reached the peak of its popularity in the 1960s and 1970s. There are more than 11,000 people registered in Finland with this name. The name means one who has good intentions.

== Notable people ==
- Outi Alanko-Kahiluoto (born 1966), Finnish politician
- Outi Alanne (born 1967), Finnish writer, also known as NeitiNaru
- Outi Borgenström-Anjala (born 1956), Finnish orienteering competitor
- Outi Heiskanen (1937–2022), Finnish artist
- Outi Kettunen (born 1978), Finnish biathlete
- Outi Mäenpää (born 1962), Finnish television actress
- Outi Ojala (1946–2017), Finnish politician
- Outi Pieski (born 1973), Sámi visual artist
- Outi Tarkiainen (born 1985), Finnish composer
