= Institute =

Organisational body created for a certain purpose

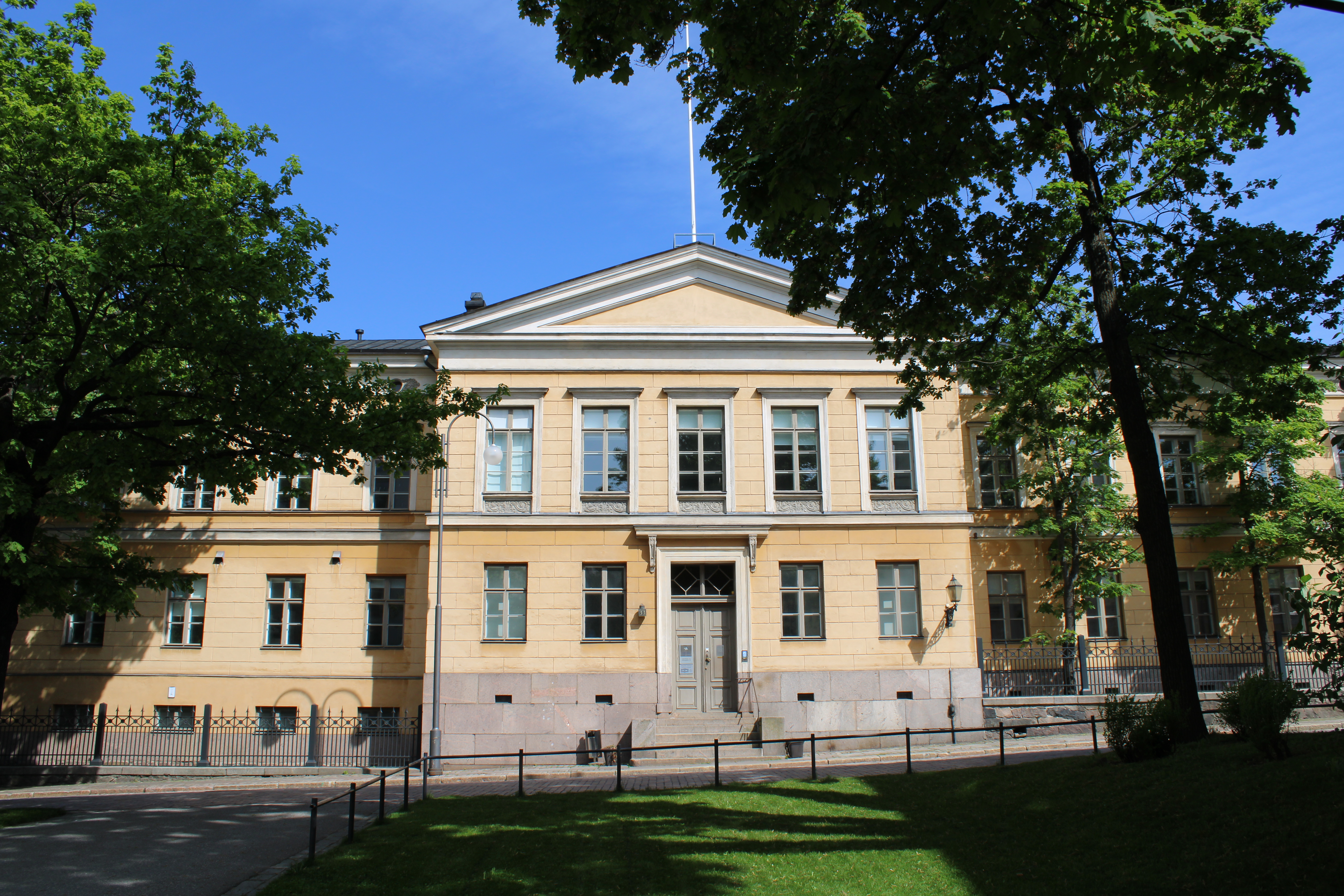
The Aleksanteri Institute in Helsinki, Finland (2021)

An institute is an organizational body created for a certain purpose. They are often research organisations (research institutes) created to do research on specific topics, or can also be a professional body.

In some countries, institutes can be part of a university or other institutions of higher education, either as a group of departments or an autonomous educational institution without a traditional university status such as a "university institute", or institute of technology. In some countries, such as South Korea and India, private schools are sometimes referred to as institutes. Similarly, in Spain, secondary schools are referred to as institutes.

Historically, in some countries, institutes were educational institutions that provided vocational training and often incorporated libraries, also known as mechanics' institutes.

The word "institute" comes from the Latin word institutum ("facility" or "habit"), in turn derived from instituere ("build", "create", "raise" or "educate").

== United Kingdom and the Isle of Man ==
In the United Kingdom and the Isle of Man, the term "institute" is a protected word, and companies or other organizations may only use the word if they are "organisations which are carrying out research at the highest level or to professional bodies of the highest standing". If a company is carrying on a business under a different name to the company name, that business name must comply with the Business Names Act. Use of the title "institute" requires approval from the Secretary of State. Failure to seek approval is a criminal offence.

== See also ==
- Chair (Polish academic department)
- Consortium
- Higher education
- Institution
- Private foundation
- Policy institute
- Research institute
