= Hannu Luntiala =

Finnish bureaucrat and author (born 1952)

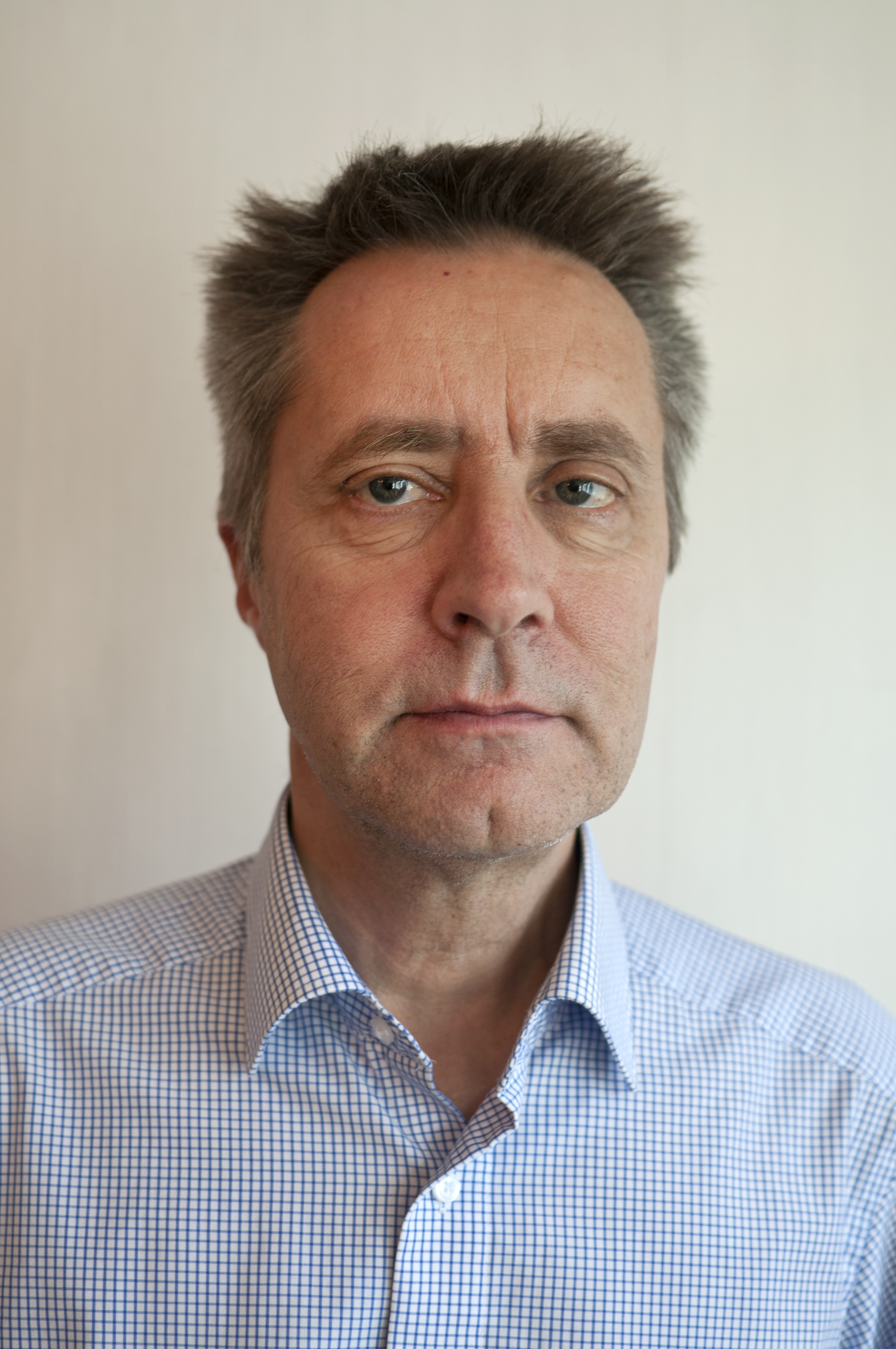
- Born: Hannu Veikko Luntiala; October 12, 1952 (age 73)
- Occupations: former Director General of the Registration office in Finland and author

Hannu Veikko Luntiala (born October 12, 1952) is the former Director General of the Population Register Centre in Finland and an author for Tammi and Aviador Kustannus, both Finnish publishing companies.

== Career at Population Register Centre ==
Hannu Luntiala made the Master of Laws degree in the University of Helsinki in 1979. In the same year, he began his career at the Population Register Centre and has since worked in the office in several different positions, e.g. as the Head of Administration and Educational Affairs. Luntiala became the Director in 1995 and later the Director General in 2003. He retired on November 1, 2016. Population Register Centre is a Finnish state authority responsible for development of population information system, nationwide information services and certificate services of electronic identification.

== Career as an author ==
Hannu Luntiala's poetry and short stories have been published in several anthologies and magazines since the 1980s. In 1999, Luntiala was one of the winners of a poem contest organized by the Finnish Cultural Foundation. In 2002, he won a short story contest organized in honor of the 100-year anniversary of the Finnish author Toivo Pekkanen, with his story of an immigrant, called Musta ("Black").

In 2006, Finnish publishing company Tammi published Luntiala's short story collection, Hommes (French for "men", "people"). Hommes is a collection of short stories about melancholic and restricted Finnish males who cannot communicate with their loved ones.

Luntiala's debut novel Viimeiset viestit ("Last Messages") was published in 2007. It is a story told in form of text messages in its entirety. It is said to be the world's first text message novel. In 2008, Viimeiset viestit was nominated for the European Book Prize (Prix du Livre Européen). It has been translated to Croatian, Slovenian, Hungarian, Russian and Estonian.

Viimeiset viestit was followed by the novel In memoriam in 2008. It mostly consists of fictional obituaries and a man trying to piece them together.

Luntiala's third novel, Petri Vallin toinen elämä ("The Other Life of Petri Vall"), was released in 2010. It is about a man who steals a dead man's identity, abandoning his old life and starting a new one as Petri Vall.

Aviador Kustannus published Luntiala's fourth novel, titled Ihmissyöjän päiväkirja ("The Diary of a Man-Eater"), in fall 2016 in Finland. It tells the story of two immigrant body lice.

Luntiala's first non-fiction book was Jazzia Jumalan armosta – Juhani Aaltosen tarina, published in fall 2017. It tells the story of Juhani "Junnu" Aaltonen, a Finnish saxophonist and flautist.

Luntiala's fifth novel, Rekisteri ("Register"), was published in fall 2021. The book is about power structures that obstruct self-determination.

In November 2023, Aviador Kustannus published Luntiala's first poetry collection, titled Suonissamme virtaa Spoon River.

== Works ==
- Hommes. Tammi. 2006. ISBN 951-31-3544-6.
- Viimeiset viestit. Tammi. 2007. ISBN 978-951-31-3806-6.
- In memoriam. Tammi. 2008. ISBN 978-951-31-4153-0.
- Petri Vallin toinen elämä. Tammi. 2010. ISBN 978-951-31-5635-0.
- Ihmissyöjän päiväkirja. Aviador Kustannus. 2016. ISBN 978-952-7063-13-2.
- Jazzia Jumalan armosta – Juhani Aaltosen tarina. Aviador Kustannus. 2017. ISBN 9789527063316.
- Rekisteri. Aviador Kustannus. 2021. ISBN 9789523810341.
- Suonissamme virtaa Spoon River. Aviador Kustannus. 2023. ISBN 9789523812048.

== Awards and honors ==
- Finnish Cultural Foundation's grand poetry contest, 1999, one of the winners
- Toivo Pekkanen 100-year memorial short story contest, 2002, winner with the short story Musta
- Nuoren Voiman Liiton ja Gummeruksen novellikilpailu, 2002, honorable mention for the short story En ole mikään luontoihminen
