= Heikki Luoma =

Finnish writer (born 1944)

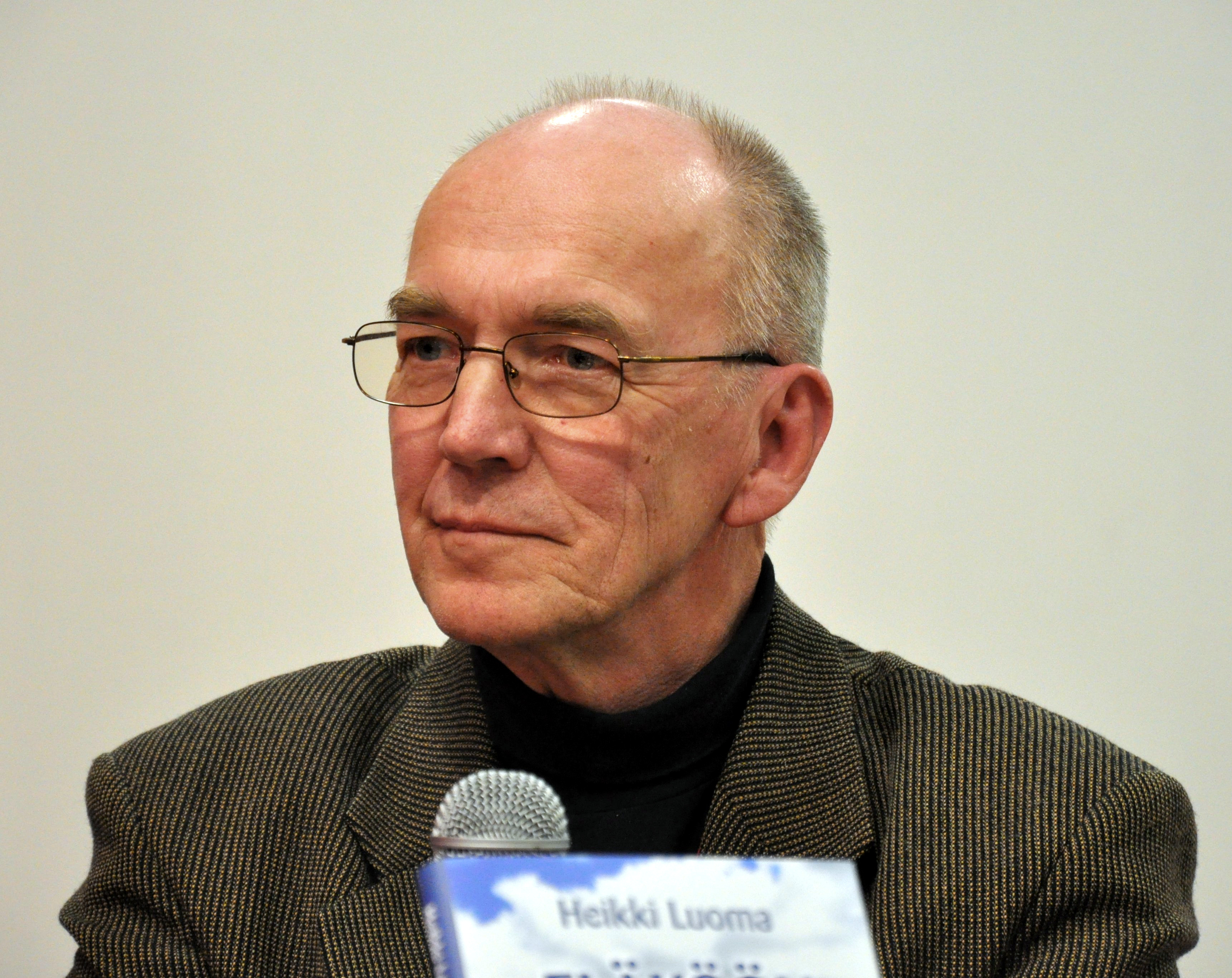

Heikki Luoma (born 3 January 1944 in Kyyjärvi) is a Finnish writer, playwright and screenwriter.

Luoma has been a full-time writer and Finnish Writers member since 1990. He has created a number of texts in award-winning writing competitions and has been awarded several scholarships. He has written novels, plays (such as Akkaralli, Joki virtaa, maa pysyy, and Korpraali Reidin Miekka), radio plays and television series.

So far, his plays have seen more than 200 premieres around Finland. He also wrote for the 2009 TV series Pirunpelto. Other YLE TV2 series he has written for include Vain muutaman huijarin tähden, Peräkamaripojat, Mooseksen perintö and Turvetta ja timantteja.
