= Kaarina Goldberg =

Finnish author and journalist (born 1956)

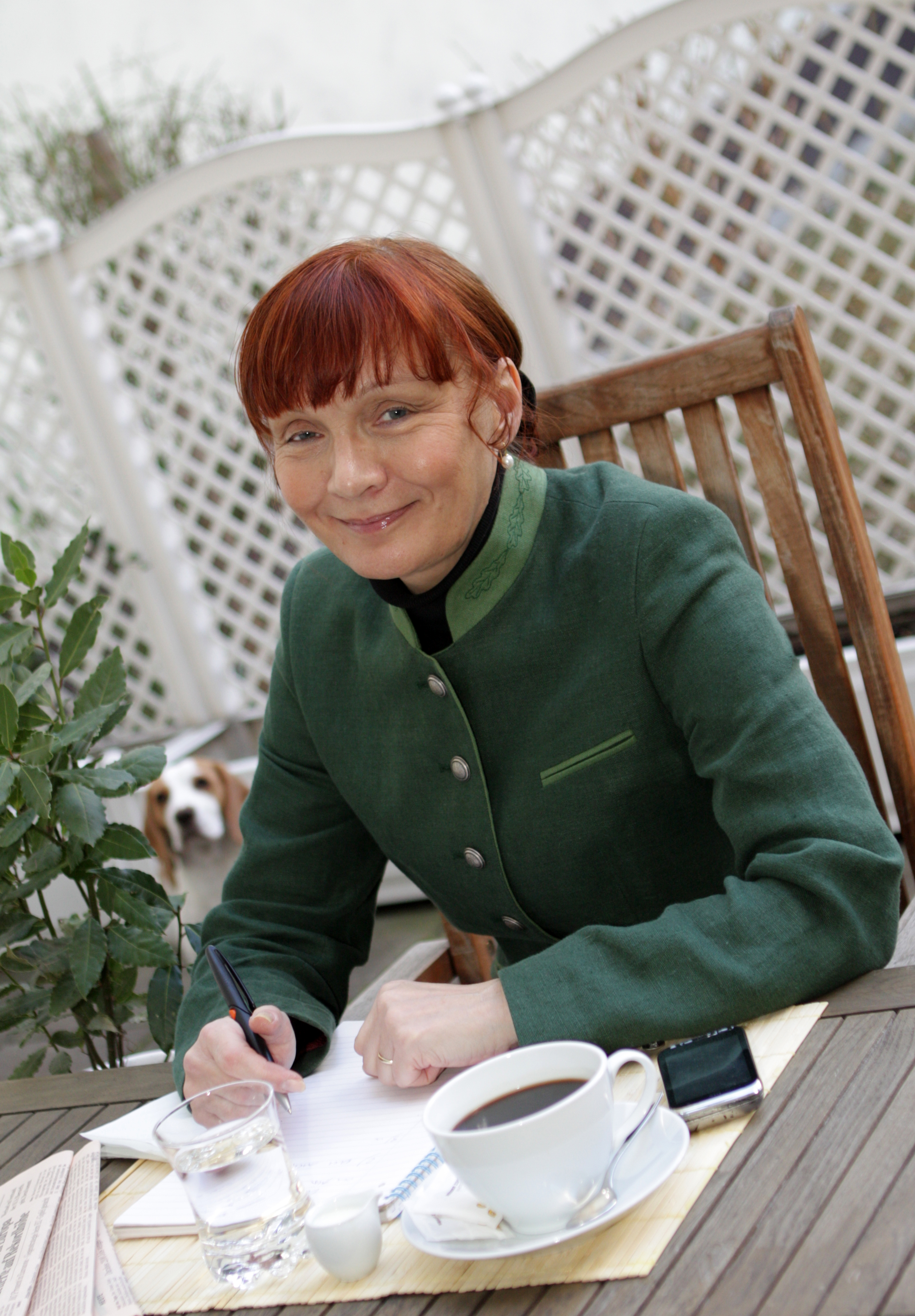
Kaarina Goldberg

Kaarina Goldberg (born January 28, 1956) is a Finnish author and journalist who lives in Vienna. She is best known for her children's books Petokylän Ilona Ilves, Rämäpäinen robotti and her comic strip Senni ja Safira in the Finnish newspaper Eläkeläiset. She is also a columnist for the Finnish gastronomy magazine Teema Nova.

In August 2010, her Senni ja Safira-comic strips were released as a book by the Finnish publishing house Karisto, representing the first comic-related publication in the company's history so far.

== Family life ==
Kaarina Goldberg lives with her husband in Austria since 1985. They have two sons (born 1984 and 1988). She is the aunt of the Finnish politicians Irina Krohn and Minerva Krohn.

== Books ==
- Oukki doukki. Karisto. 1985. ISBN 951-23-2249-8.
- Petokylän Ilona Ilves. Karisto. 1987. ISBN 951-23-2437-7.
- Rämäpäinen robotti. Otava. 1995. ISBN 951-1-13480-9.
- Senni ja Safira – vanhuus ei tule yksin. Karisto. 2010. ISBN 978-951-23-5274-6.
- Senni ja Safira – Kurtturuusut. Karisto. 2011. ISBN 978-951-23-5448-1.
- Senni ja Safira – Teräsmuorit. Karisto. 2012. ISBN 978-951-23-5578-5.
- Drufva, Juha - editor, Goldberg, Kaarina - illustrations (2010). Rukiista ruokaa – eläkeläisten tarinoita. Eläkeläiset ry. ISBN 978-952-92-6883-2.
- Rechberger, Petra - author, Goldberg, Kaarina - illustrations (2011). Billy ist anders. Bayer Verlag. ISBN 978-3-902814-68-5.
- Voi vitsi, mikä virus!. BoD. 2018. ISBN 978-9528003700.
