= Tapani Bagge =

Finnish author

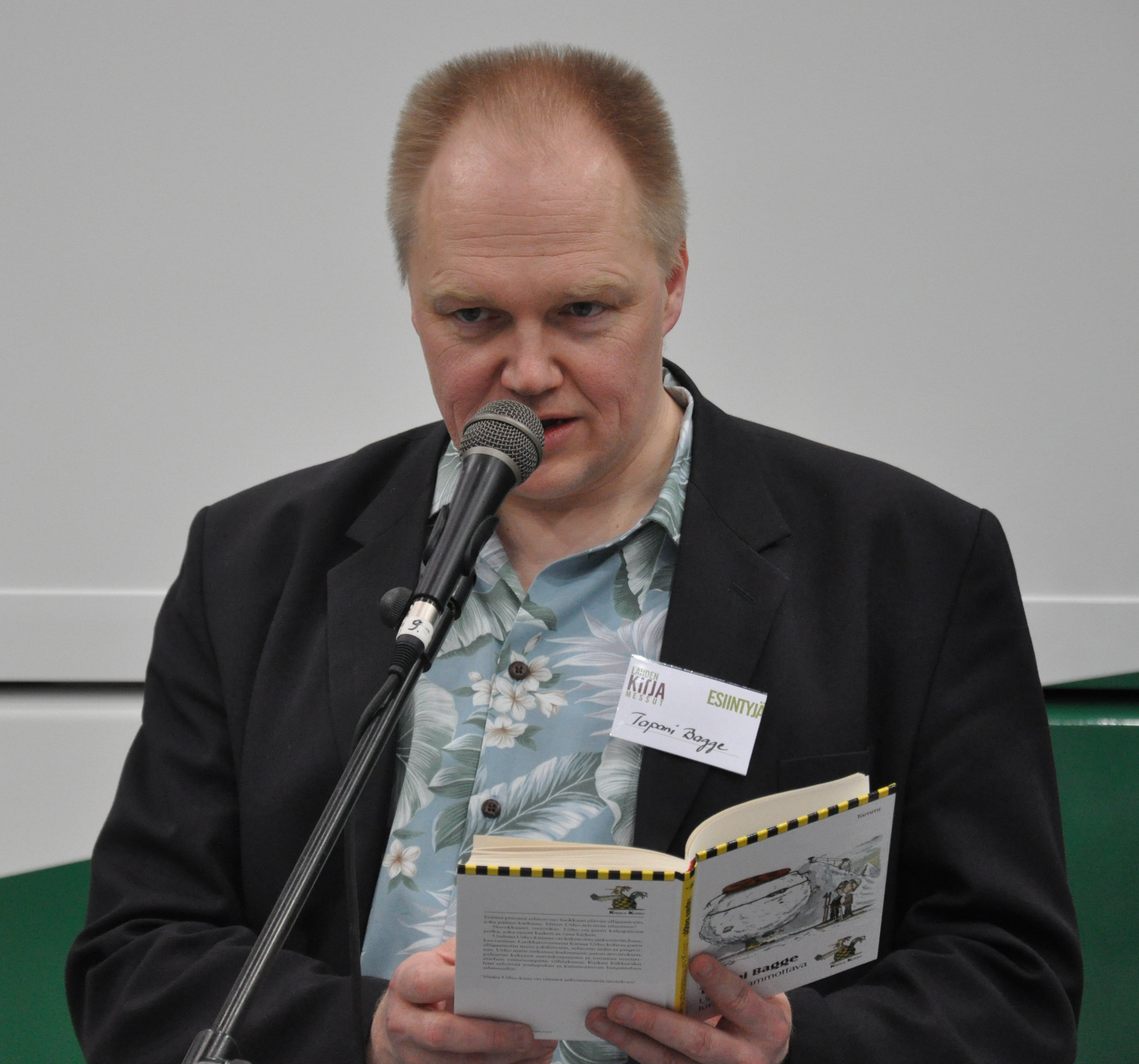
Tapani Bagge at the Lahti Book Fair, 2009.

Juha Tapani Bagge (born October 2, 1962, in Kerava) is a Finnish author. He began writing full in 1983, and has published multiple novels, plays, comic scripts, radio plays, as well as television series scripts. He has also translated a large number of crime novels.

== Works ==
=== Crime Novels ===
Hämeenlinna noir

- Puhaltaja. Helsinki: Gummerus, Book Studio. 2002. ISBN 951-20-6039-6.
- Paha kuu. Helsinki: Gummerus, Book Studio. 2003. ISBN 951-20-6297-6.
- Kohtalon tähti. Helsinki: Gummerus, Book Studio. 2004. ISBN 951-20-6690-4.
- Julma maa. Helsinki: Tammi. 2005. ISBN 951-31-3358-3.
- Musta taivas. Helsinki: Tammi. 2006. ISBN 951-31-3714-7.
- Kummisedän hautajaiset. Helsinki: Tammi. 2008. ISBN 978-951-31-4238-4.
- Havannan kuu. Helsinki: Crime Time. 2014. ISBN 978-952-289-135-8.
- Pieni talvisota. Helsinki: Crime Time. 2015. ISBN 978-952-289-230-0.
- Vieras mies. Helsinki: Crime Time. 2018. ISBN 978-952-289-426-7.

Väinö Mujunen

- Valkoinen hehku. Helsinki: Tammi. 2009. ISBN 978-951-31-4741-9.
- Sininen aave. Helsinki: Tammi. 2011. ISBN 978-951-31-5865-1.
- Musta pyörre. Helsinki: Crime Time. 2012. ISBN 978-952-5918-72-4.
- Punainen varjo. Helsinki: Crime Time. 2013. ISBN 978-952-289-043-6.

Onni Syrjänen

- Kasvot tuulilasissa. Turku: Turbator. 2010. ISBN 978-952-5666-44-1.
- Kasvot katuojassa. Helsinki: Crime Time. 2011. ISBN 978-952-5918-27-4.

Elviira Noir

- Pikku enkeli. Helsinki: Crime Time. 2016. ISBN 978-952-289-294-2.
- Pirunsaari. Helsinki: Crime Time. 2017. ISBN 978-952-289-400-7.
- Pitkä kosto. Helsinki: Crime Time. 2019. ISBN 978-952-289-558-5.

Others

- Oravanpyörä. Saarijärvi: Vakka & Kansi. 2010. ISBN 978-952-5912-04-3.

=== Other books ===
- Pelastajat. Hyvinkää: Book Studio. 1998. ISBN 951-611-903-4.

=== Short story collection ===
- Kasvot betonissa. Helsinki: Tammi. 2007. ISBN 978-951-31-3640-6.

=== Young adult books ===
Aki Korhonen

- Korhonen ja kadonnut faija. Helsinki: WSOY. 1993. ISBN 951-0-18663-5.
- Korhonen ja kuoleman haju. Helsinki: WSOY. 1995. ISBN 951-0-20442-0.

Etsivätoimisto Musta koira

- Päättömän munkin arvoitus. Helsinki: Tammi. 2008. ISBN 978-951-31-4313-8.
- Liekehtivän liskon arvoitus. Helsinki: Tammi. 2009. ISBN 978-951-31-4925-3.
- Kirkuvan kallon arvoitus. Helsinki: Tammi. 2010. ISBN 978-951-31-5434-9.

Juha & Ola

- Bagge, Tapani & Hämäläinen, Karo (2002). Julma kuukausi. Helsinki: Tammi. ISBN 951-31-2368-5.
- Bagge, Tapani & Hämäläinen, Karo (2003). Marrasblues. Helsinki: Tammi. ISBN 951-31-2824-5.
- Bagge, Tapani & Hämäläinen, Karo (2004). Helmi kuukausi. Helsinki: Tammi. ISBN 951-31-3065-7.
- Bagge, Tapani & Hämäläinen, Karo (2005). Juhannusblues. Helsinki: Tammi. ISBN 951-31-3413-X.
- Bagge, Tapani & Hämäläinen, Karo (2007). Karu kuukausi. Helsinki: Tammi. ISBN 978-951-31-3967-4.

Others

- Suden hetki. Helsinki: WSOY. 1999. ISBN 951-0-23737-X.
- Pikkuveli. Helsinki: Tammi. 2001. ISBN 951-31-2242-5.
- Tuhlaajafaija. Helsinki: Tammi. 2003. ISBN 951-31-2742-7.

=== Children's books ===
Aleksi

- Aleksin merirosvokesä. Helsinki: WSOY. 1995. ISBN 951-0-20044-1.
- Aleksin intiaanisyksy. Helsinki: WSOY. 1996. ISBN 951-0-20878-7.
- Aleksin avaruustalvi. Helsinki: WSOY. 1997. ISBN 951-0-21637-2.

Urho

- Urho ja viidakon villipeto. Helsinki: Tammi. 2001. ISBN 951-31-2060-0.
- Urho ja hirmuliskojen kuningas. Helsinki: Tammi. 2002. ISBN 951-31-2233-6.
- Urho ja suuri junaryöstö. Helsinki: Tammi. 2004. ISBN 951-31-3009-6.
- Urho ja asemapäällikön aave. Helsinki: Tammi. 2006. ISBN 951-31-3687-6.
- Urho ja kammottava lumimies. Helsinki: Tammi. 2009. ISBN 978-951-31-4434-0.
- Urho ja sininen sukellustalo. Helsinki: Tammi. 2011. ISBN 978-951-31-6272-6.
- Urho ja Aaveiden meri. Helsinki: Tammi. 2012. ISBN 978-951-31-6611-3.

Kaisa

- Pihalla. Helsinki: Tammi. 2002. ISBN 951-31-2367-7.
- Ulkona. Helsinki: Tammi. 2004. ISBN 951-31-2926-8.
- Kylässä. Helsinki: Tammi. 2005. ISBN 951-31-3303-6.
- Yöllä. Helsinki: Tammi. 2006. ISBN 951-31-3502-0.
- Kaupungilla. Helsinki: Tammi. 2007. ISBN 978-951-31-3904-9.
- Maalla. Helsinki: Tammi. 2010. ISBN 978-951-31-4748-8.
- Maailmalla. Helsinki: Tammi. 2011. ISBN 978-951-31-5780-7.
- Kotona. Helsinki: Tammi. 2013. ISBN 978-951-31-7105-6.
- Rannalla. Helsinki: Tammi. 2015. ISBN 978-951-31-8142-0.
- Talvella. Helsinki: Tammi. 2017. ISBN 978-951-31-9271-6.

Apassit

- Aavehevosen arvoitus. Helsinki: Karisto. 2018. ISBN 978-951-23-6361-2.
- Vanajaveden hirviö. Helsinki: Karisto. 2018. ISBN 978-951-23-6516-6.
- Katoava muumio. Helsinki: Karisto. 2019. ISBN 978-951-23-6620-0.
- Rautamiehen arvoitus. Helsinki: Karisto. 2020. ISBN 978-951-23-6777-1.
- Sielulinnun arvoitus. Hämeenlinna: Karisto. 2021. ISBN 978-951-1-38897-5.

Ukulele-etsivä Nina

- Pohjoisen pikavuoron arvoitus. Aviador. 2019. ISBN 978-952-7063-95-8.

== Awards ==
- Häme Cultural Award 2005
- Arvid Lydecken Award for 2005's children's book In the Village
- Pertsa and Kilu Award 2006
- The Lead Award 2007 of detective novels Black Sky
