= Fredrika Wilhelmina Carstens =

Finnish writer

Fredrika Wilhelmina Carstens, née Stichaeus (5 June 1808, Naantali – 13 April 1888, Helsinki) was a Finnish writer. She is known as the author of the first novel published in Finland (Murgrönan, 1840) and is considered one of the most significant figures in Finnish women’s literature.

== Life and career ==
Fredrika Wilhelmina Stichaeus was born on 5 June 1808 in Naantali to Johan Fredrik Stichaeus, governor of Häme County, and Fredrika Eleonora Stichaeus (née Ekholm). At the time of her birth, Finland was part of the Swedish Empire, which was at war with Russia (at the end of the war in 1809, Sweden lost Finland to Russia).

At the age of 21 Stichaeus married a lieutenant Carl Adolf Otto Carstens. The family had seven children: one daughter, Hilda, and six sons, Constantin, Alfred, Wilhelm, Fredrik, and twins Sten and Carl.

In the 1830s, Carstens began writing for newspapers under the pseudonym "R". She spoke out about the position of women and defended the right of women to higher education, arguing that an educated woman could better fulfill her duties as a wife and mother.

In 1840, Carstens anonymously published a novel Murgrönan in Swedish language. It is considered the first novel published in Finland. The novel was severely criticized, especially for its "female-style," sprawling language, and Carstens did not publish anything except a few poems thereafter. She continued to write for the newspaper Morgonbladet.

After her husband’s death in 1842, Carstens and her children were left in a difficult financial position as the estate went bankrupt. Through the trial, Carstens received two houses belonging to her father in Porvoo.

Carstens engaged in charity and in the 1850s announced her charity celebration in the press under her own name, which was greatly disapproved. The more traditional and accepted way was to perform behind an anonymous lady’s association. However, the charity events organized by Carstens raised a lot of money.

Fredrika Wilhelmina Carstens died on 13 April 1888 in Helsinki.

== Murgrönan ==
The protagonists of the novel are two young girls, one of whom is disappointed in love and dies early.

Murgrönan was forgotten for a long time until the late 20th century when feminist literary research revisited Murgrönan alongside other novels written by early women. Murgrönan was published in Finnish in May 2007 under the name Muratti.
