= Anna Edelheim =

Finnish journalist

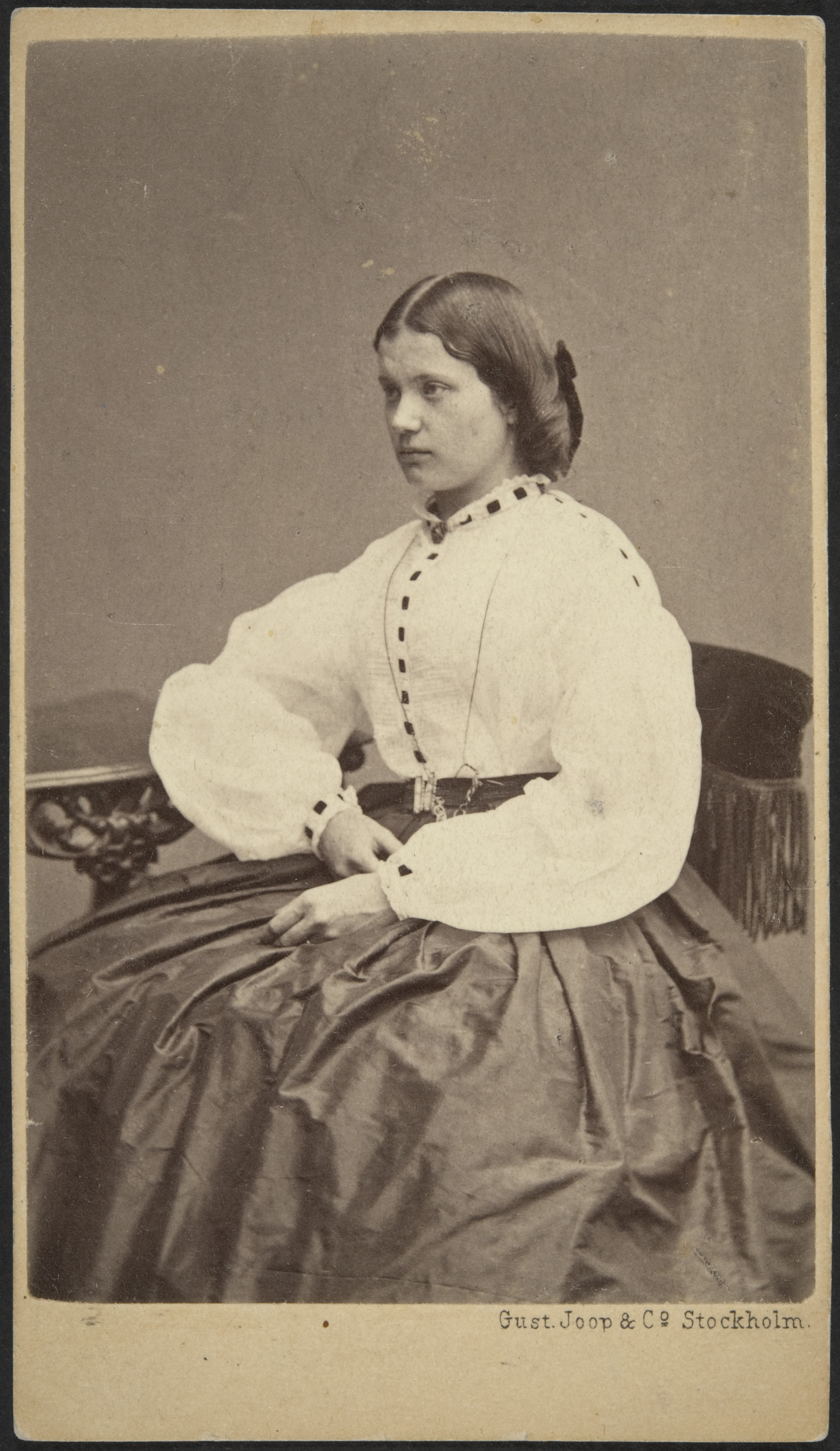
- Edelheim in 1864
- Born: 3 January 1845; Helsinki, Finland
- Died: 25 May 1902 (aged 57); Helsinki, Finland
- Occupation: Journalist
- Known for: "First female journalist in Finland"
- Parents: Paul Henrik Edelheim (father); Emilia Christina af Brunér (mother)

Anna Christina Charlotta Edelheim (3 January 1845 in Helsinki – 25 May 1902 in Helsinki), was a Finnish journalist. She is considered to be one of the first female journalists in Finland.

== Life ==
Anna Edelheim was born to politician Paul Henrik Edelheim and Emilia Christina af Brunér and sister of architect Frans Edvard Edelheim.

Edelheim was educated at the Svenska fruntimmersskolan i Helsingfors and then in Stockholm in Sweden.

She was active as a journalist for the Finland ("Finland") in 1886-1888. As such, she has traditionally been referred to as the first professional female journalist in Finland. In reality however this was not technically correct as there were earlier examples, the first of whom was Catharina Ahlgren.

In 1888 she became the founder, managing editor and publisher of the weekly newspaper Finska Veckobladet ('Finnish Weekly').

She foremost focused on women's rights, freedom of religion and controversial subjects such as a secular wedding ceremonies.

== Works ==
1. Fremlingens dotter : en sommarsaga från en finsk insjö, af -ei-. Helsingfors 1878
2. I brytningstid : samtal i språkfrågan af x.?. Söderström, Helsingfors 1897
3. Hemkomsten, af -im. Fosterländsk läsning. Serie 2 N:o 2. Stockholm 1903
