= Martti Löfberg =

Martti Erik Hjalmar Löfberg (March 5, 1907, Helsinki - February 1969) was a successful Finnish pulp fiction author, especially in the 1930s and the 1940s. Though writing his adventure stories, science fiction and mystery novels under a long list of pseudonyms, the one he was best known for was Marton Taiga.

Martti Löfbergs father was the owner of a sizeable sporting goods store, importing bicycles from Chemnitz, and the son was planned to enter the family business. However he death of his father and subsequent bankruptcy of the sporting goods store liberated Martti to pursue his literary career.

During his heyday Marton Taiga was one of the best selling writers, if not the highest earner of them, but self-effacing to a fault, and thus nearly completely unknown to the general public as a person beyond his pseudonymous works.

His good friend Aarne Haapakoski was a major influence on him, and he in turn influenced other authors such as Mika Waltari, whose "Komisario Palmu" character drew significantly on Löfbergs police character William J. Kairala. The Kairala stories were published under the pseudonym M. Levä.

Another long running character of his was the intrepid newspaper reporter Kid Barrow (known by his nickname "Carrot"); a Tintinesque character.

== Selected bibliography ==
- Mustan Lipun Ritarit, (serialised 1932 in Lukemista Kaikille magazine, published as a book 1937) an adventure story set in Afghanistan, Marton Taigas first novel. Dramatized for radio by Yleisradio.
- Osiriksen Sormus, (serialized 1934) a time travel novel with ancient Egypt as the milieu.
- 8 Taivaallista Miestä, (serialized, republished in book form 1986)
