= Uljas Vikström =

Finnish-born Soviet writer

Uljas Vikström (Russian: Ульяс Викстрем; 3 March 1910 – 17 April 1977) was a Soviet writer, translator and editor, who wrote in Finnish and Russian.

Born in Turku, Grand Duchy of Finland, Vikström fled as a child with his family to Soviet Russia after the victory of the Whites in the Finnish Civil War of 1918. Vikström graduated in 1933 from Leningrad Institute of Journalism and in 1935 from the Communist University of the National Minorities of the West. He began his career of writing in 1934. He worked for many years as the editor-in-chief of the newspaper Punalippu and translated a number of books by Soviet authors into Finnish.

Vikström was the chairman of the Karelian Union of Writers from 1971 to 1975, and in 1968, he was awarded the title of an honorary cultural figure of the Karelian ASSR. Vikström died at the age of 67 in Petrozavodsk in 1977.

== Works ==
- Uusia ystäviä, a play, 1950
- Käy eespäin väki voimakas…, 1956
- Suvelan Osku, 1961
- Toiska, a narration about the life of Toivo Antikainen, 1969
- Torpeedo, a narration about the life of Otto Wille Kuusinen, 1972
- Hajamuistoja, 1978
