= Karisto =

Area of Lahti, Finland

- Village
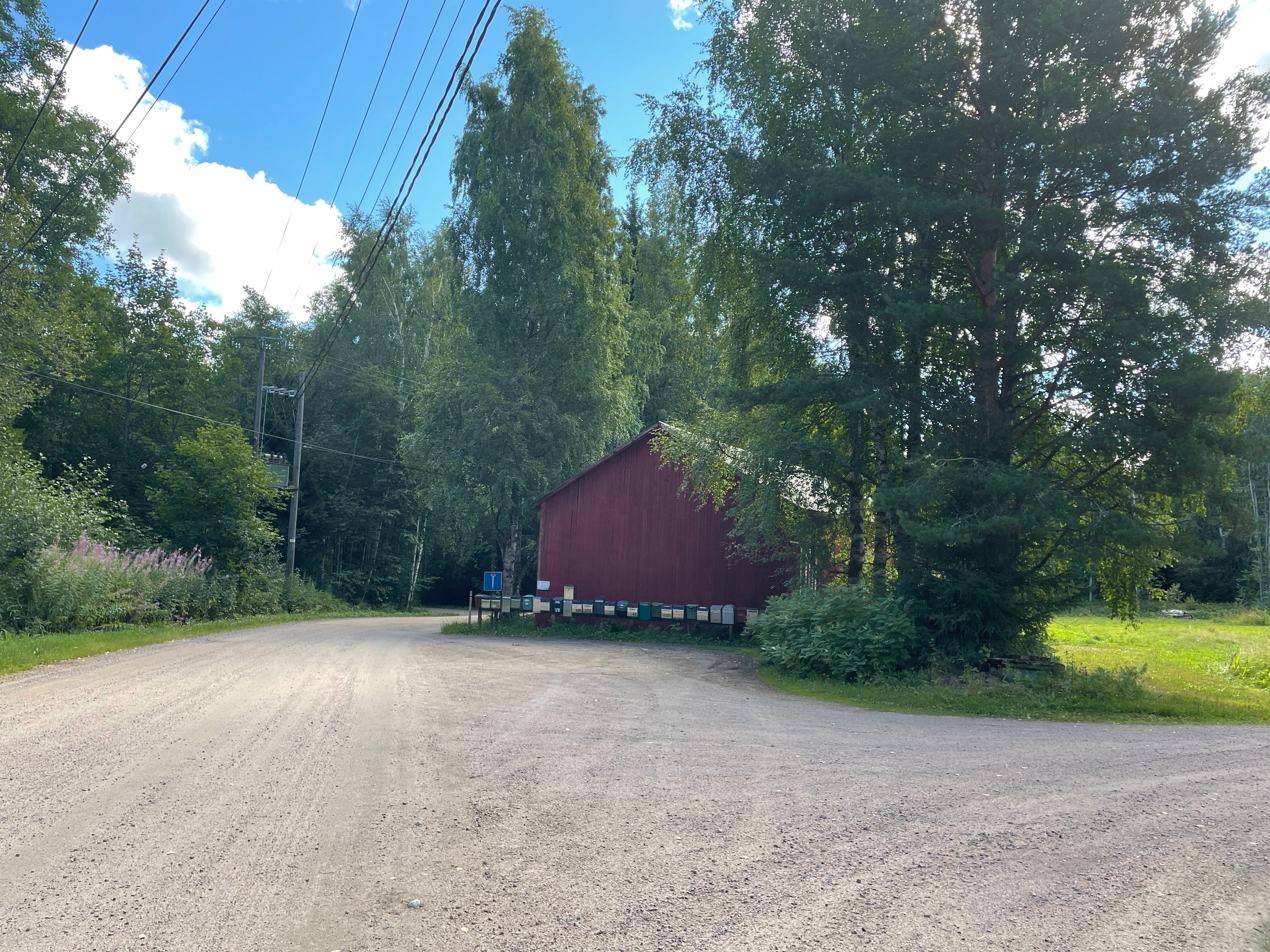
- Interactive map of Karisto
- Coordinates: 60.97566612180067°N 25.771435948649803°E

Population
  - Total: 3,150
- Postal code: 15160

Karisto is an area in the city of Lahti, Finland. Karisto used to belong to the municipality of Nastola until 1956. Karisto as an area used to mean the hilltop of Karisto and also the coast side, but later on, Karisto became bigger and it spread to the area called Järvenpää. Karisto has an elementary school that has approximately 400 students, a public kindergarten with approximately 150 places, and also a private kindergarten called Touhula Karisto.

== History ==
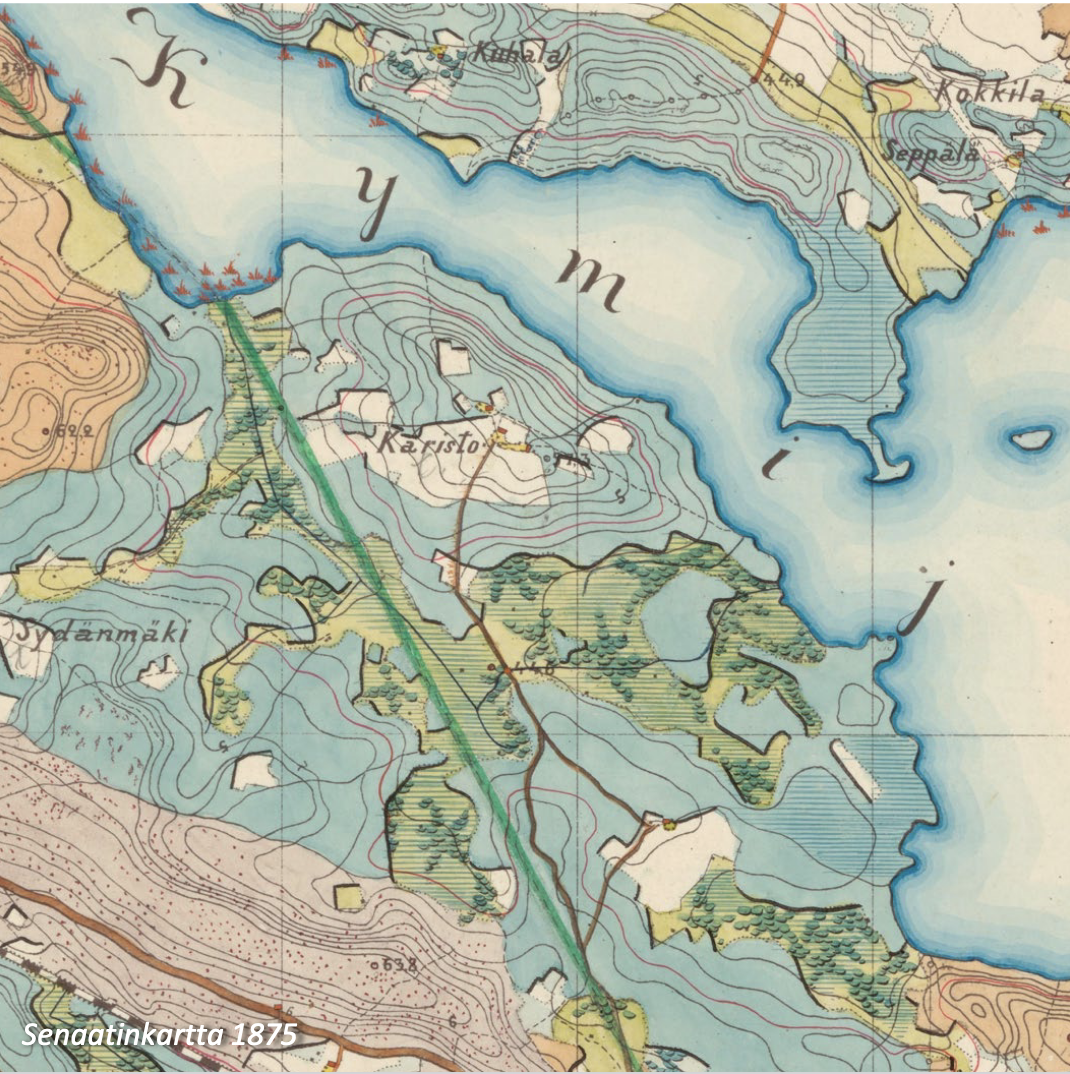
Finlands Senates map of Karisto.

Karisto has had settlers since the late 1700s. After the Second World War during the late 1940s and early 1950s, buildings started to be built from the hilltop to the coastline. Coastline plots were split into long and narrow shapes so that there would be as many coastline plots as possible. The whole coastline was uninhabited and all the areas were cleared by hand. The coastline was ready by the end of the 1950s. After all the construction sites were done the milieu became very regionalistic. Many of the houses had animals such as cows, horses, chickens, and hogs. There were a variety of transportation methods to Lahti and elsewhere. Karisto had a road to Villähde which went through the Huiko area. A boat trip was usually taken to Myllypohja where there was a train connection to Lahti and Heinola. The main road of Karisto was Karistontie which nowadays is known as Karistonkatu.
