= Pedar Jalvi =

- Born: 10 April 1888; Outakoski, Utsjoki, Finland
- Died: 8 August 1916 (aged 28); Inari, Finland

Pedar Jalvi or Peđar Jalvi (10 April 1888 – 8 August 1916) was Finland's first Sámi writer and has been called the principal figure of Sámi literature. He attended the Jyväskylä Teachers College, from which he graduated in 1915. While he was teaching in Savitaipale, he wrote his first book, Muohtačalmmit (Snowflakes), which was published in 1915.

Pedar Jalvi was also known by the following names:

- Pekka Pohjansäde
- Piera Klemetinpoika Helander
- Lemehaš-Biehtár
