= Salla Simukka =

Finnish writer

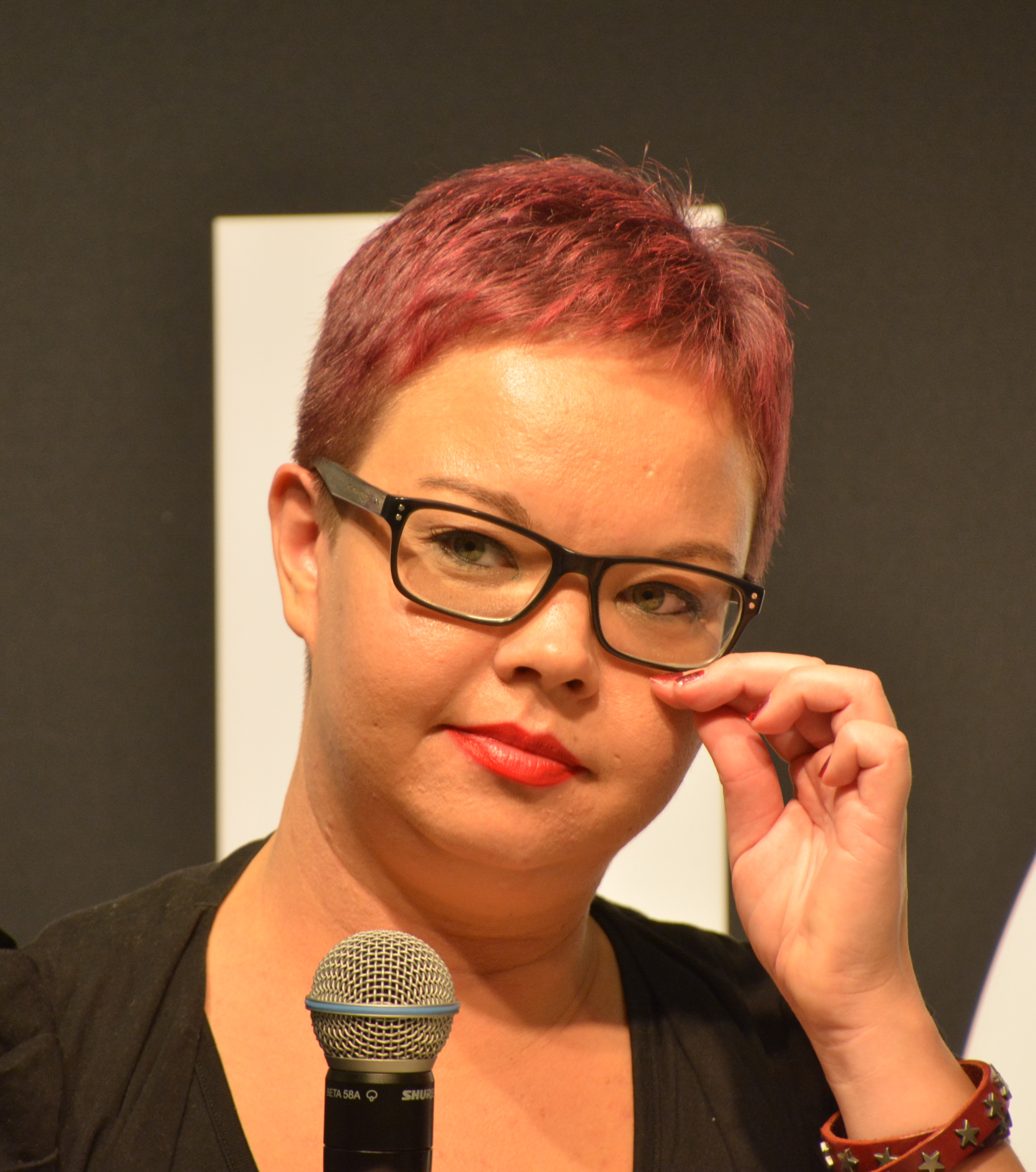
- Salla Simukka at Gothenburg Book Fair 2015
- Born: June 16, 1981 (age 45); Tampere
- Occupations: Author, translator, literary critic

Salla Simukka (born 16 June 1981) is a Finnish novelist, translator and literary critic, and winner of the Topelius Prize 2013 and the Finland Prize 2013. She is known for her young adult series The Snow White Trilogy, which was originally published in Finnish as the Lumikki Andersson trilogy.

== Biography ==
Simukka was born in Tampere and showed an interest in writing at a young age. She completed her first book when she was 18 and has since written several novels in addition to translating foreign works into Finnish. As a critic, she has written reviews for Helsingin Sanomat and Hämeen Sanomat. She has also worked as an editor for the literary journal LUKUfiilis and as a scriptwriter for the Finnish Broadcasting Company.

== Snow White Trilogy ==
Simukka came up with the idea for the Snow White Trilogy after visiting a bookstore in Germany and seeing a section for young adult thriller novels. She then realized that Finland did not have many novels that fit into the genre. Sony Pictures has shown an interest in adapting the series for film.

The series has been pitched as “Lisbeth Salander for a young adult audience.”

== Awards ==
In 2013, Simukka received two awards: the Topelius Prize for the best Finnish youth novel (for Jäljellä (Without a Trace) and Toisaalla (Elsewhere); and the Finland Prize for a promising breakthrough.

== Bibliography ==
=== The Snow White Trilogy ===
1. Punainen kuin veri (2013, published in English as As Red as Blood , 2014)
2. Valkea kuin lumi (2014, published in English as As White as Snow, 2015)
3. Musta kuin eebenpuu (2014, published in English as As Black As Ebony, 2015)

=== Tapio ja Moona ===
1. Kipinä (2006)
2. Virhemarginaali (2007)
3. Takatalvi (2008)
4. Meno-paluu (2009)
5. Ylivalotus (2011)

=== Other work ===
- Kun enkelit katsovat muualle (2002)
- Minuuttivalssi (2004)
- Viimeiset (2005)
- Mummo marjassa: kolmannen vuosituhannen huonoimmat vitsit (2007, with Karo Hämäläinen, illustrated by Maria Heikkilä)
- Luokkakuva (2009, with Karo Hämäläinen)
- Jäljellä (2012)
- Toisaalla (2012)
- Sisarla (2016, translated to English as Sisterland)

=== As translator ===
- Elä, kuolet kumminkin – Mummojen ja pappojen viisauksia (2005)
- Ihon alla (2007)
- Megajätkä - Suuri salaisuus (2007)
- Uinuva uhka (2007)
