= Michel Ekman =

Swedish-speaking Finnish literary critic

Michel Flemmingsson Ekman (born 25 February 1956 in Helsinki) is a Swedish-speaking Finnish literary critic. He is a frequent contributor to Svenska Dagbladet and Hufvudstadsbladet. He has written several books. He won the Statsrådet Mauritz Hallbergs Prize in 2012. He lives and works in Helsinki.
