= Ulla Aartomaa =

Finnish writer and museum curator

Ulla Aartomaa (born 1949) is a Finnish art and design writer and museum curator.

Aartomaa was born in Kuopio, and received her master's degree in History of Art from Jyväskylä University in 1977, later studying at the Alvar Aalto Museum, the Museum of Central Finland and the Kuopio Museum of Cultural History. Later Aartomaa was a curator at Lahti Art Museum and taught at universities and colleges in Lahti and at Helsinki University.

Numerous books and magazines related to art and design in Finland have been published by Aartomaa, and she has also lectured across Europe in cities such as Amsterdam, as well as in Mexico. 2014 The Best Art Book of the Year, Eliel Aspelin Book Competition, Posters from Finland with Kari Savolainen.
