= Fredrika Lovisa Lindqvist =

Finnish writer (1786–1841)

- Born: 22 February 1786 Turku, Finland
- Died: 14 April 1841 (aged 55) Stockholm
- Occupation: Writer

Fredrika Lovisa Lindqvist (22 February 1786 Turku – 14 April 1841 Stockholm) was a Finnish writer who wrote in Swedish.

== History ==
Lindqvist, whose father was Royal Academy of Turku professor Johan Henrik Lindqvist and godfather Henrik Gabriel Porthan, became interested in reading and writing at a young age. After the Great Fire of Turku in 1827, she moved to Sweden, where in 1838 she published a collection of four novels, Poems in Prose.

== Bibliography ==
- Poems in Prose. Zacharias Haeggström, Stockholm 1838.
- Thoughts on Several Subjects 1842.
- Notes from my inner and outer life, with biographical introduction by Carl-Rudolf Gardberg. Turku Academy, Turku 1980.
