= Hassi =

Hassi is a Finnish surname. Notable people with the surname include:

- Jouko Hassi (born 1959), Finnish sprinter
- Satu Hassi (born 1951), Finnish politician

== See also ==
- Hassinen
