= Väinö Merivirta =

Finnish lawyer and politician

Väinö Johannes Merivirta (his original last name was Sjöström) was born on July 16, 1892, in Pori and died on November 20, 1937, in Helsinki.

== Early life and education ==
He worked as a lawyer, wrote books, and was involved in politics as a member of Parliament of Finland. His parents were Johannes Sjöström, who worked in a machine factory, and Edla Sofia Sundberg. He finished high school in 1911, and by 1917 had earned degrees in philosophy and arts from the university of Helsinki. Merivirta also completed both law and administrative law studies by 1921.

== Career ==
He became a deputy judge in 1926. In parliament, he represented the National Progressive Party. for the Turku southern constituency between 1935 and 1936, succeeding Toivo Tyrni. Merivirta also served on the Turku City Council and was chairman of the board at the Workers' College.

From 1921 to 1934, Merivirta operated his own law firm in Turku. He served as the city's legal advocate for the poor between 1929 and 1934 and then worked as a municipal attorney in Helsinki from 1934 until his death in 1937. He was also involved in adult education, guiding legal study circles at the Turku Workers' Institute.
