= Tuula Kallioniemi =

Finnish writer

Tuula Kallioniemi (born 22 March 1951 in Kymi) is an author of Finnish children's literature. She was awarded the Topelius Prize in 1979, the State's Prize for Literature in 1985 and the Anni Swan Medal in 1994.

She wrote the Reuhurinteen ala-aste series, the first book of which was published in 1997. The books are about lives of the pupils and teacher Aapeli Käki in a fictional elementary school in Finland. Her other works include Lätkässä (1990), Rääväsuu rakastuu (1991) and Ihmemies Topi (1998).
