= Aatto Suppanen =

Adolf (Aatto) Suppanen (born 15 April 1855 in Ruskeala, Grand Duchy of Finland, Russian Empire d. 3 February 1898 in Helsinki) was a Finnish writer, journalist and translator. He used the nom de plume of Aatto S.

By the late 1800s Suppanen had become a prolific translator into Finnish, primarily from Swedish and German, and he was the first professional literary translator into Finnish. Two well-known English-language works that he translated were Lew Wallace's Ben-Hur (Ben-Hur: kertomus Kristuksen ajoilta), and Harriet Beecher Stowe's Uncle Tom's Cabin (Setä Tuomon tupa)

On 1 June 1882, he married Alma Erika Henriette Bonsdorff (1851–1937), from Jokioinen, the daughter of Erik Napoleon Bonsdorff (1805–1870) and Henriette Rotkirch (1808–1851). The couple had four children, Aino (b. 1884), Toini (b. 1885), Viljo (b. 1887) and Alma (b. 1888).

== Works ==
- 1888: Kotivarkaus: kuvaus Itä-Suomesta ("Stolen home: a description of Eastern Finland"), novella. WSOY 1888, 86 pages (published under the name "Aatto S.")

== Translations to Finnish ==
- 1880: Friedrich Spielhagen, Röschen vom Hofe (1864), translated as Hovin Roosa.
- 1881-1886: Zachris Topelius, Vinterqvällar ("Winter evenings", 1881), translated as Talvi-iltain tarinoita (published in sections by Söderström)
- 1881: E.T.A. Hoffmann, Meister Martin der Küfner und seine Gesellen ("Martin the master cooper and his journeymen", 1818), translated as Martti mestari ja hänen kisällinsä
- 1883: Anne Charlotte Edgren-Leffler, "Barnet" ("Child"), in Ur lifvet II ("From Life II", 1883), translated as "Lapsi".
- 1883: Georg Weber, Die Weltgeschichte in übersichtlicher Darstellung, ("Outlines of universal history"), translated as Yleinen ihmiskunnan historia.
- 1883: Conrad Ferdinand Meyer, Gustav Adolfs Page (1882), translated as Paashi Leubelfing.
- 1885: Anthology of Scandinavian short stories by Bjørnstjerne Bjørnson, Jonas Lie, Alexander Kielland, Lars Dilling, Holger Drachmann, J.P. Jakobsen, Henrik Pontoppidan, August Strindberg, C.J.L. Almqvist, Anne Edgren-Leffler and Mathilda Roos, translated as Skandinaviasta Novelli-kirja
- 1886-1897: Zachris Topelius, Läsning för barn ("Reading to children"), poems by Eino Tamminen and Olof Berg, translated as Lukemisia lapsille.
- 1888: Otto Sjögren, Historisk läsebok för skolan och hemmet: Gamla tiden och medeltiden ("History reader for the school and home: Ancient world and Middle Ages", 1875), translated as Historiallinen lukukirja: Vanha ja Keski-aika.
- 1889: Lew Wallace, novel Ben-Hur (1880), translated as Ben-Hur: kertomus Kristuksen ajoilta.
- 1893: Johan Jacob Ahrenberg, Familjen på Haapakoski ("The family at Haapakoski"), translated as Haapakoskelaiset. (Haapakoski is a small town of about 9,500 people) near Lapua, Finland.)
- 1893: Harriet Beecher Stowe, Uncle Tom's Cabin, translated as Setä Tuomon tupa.
