= Johnny Spunky =

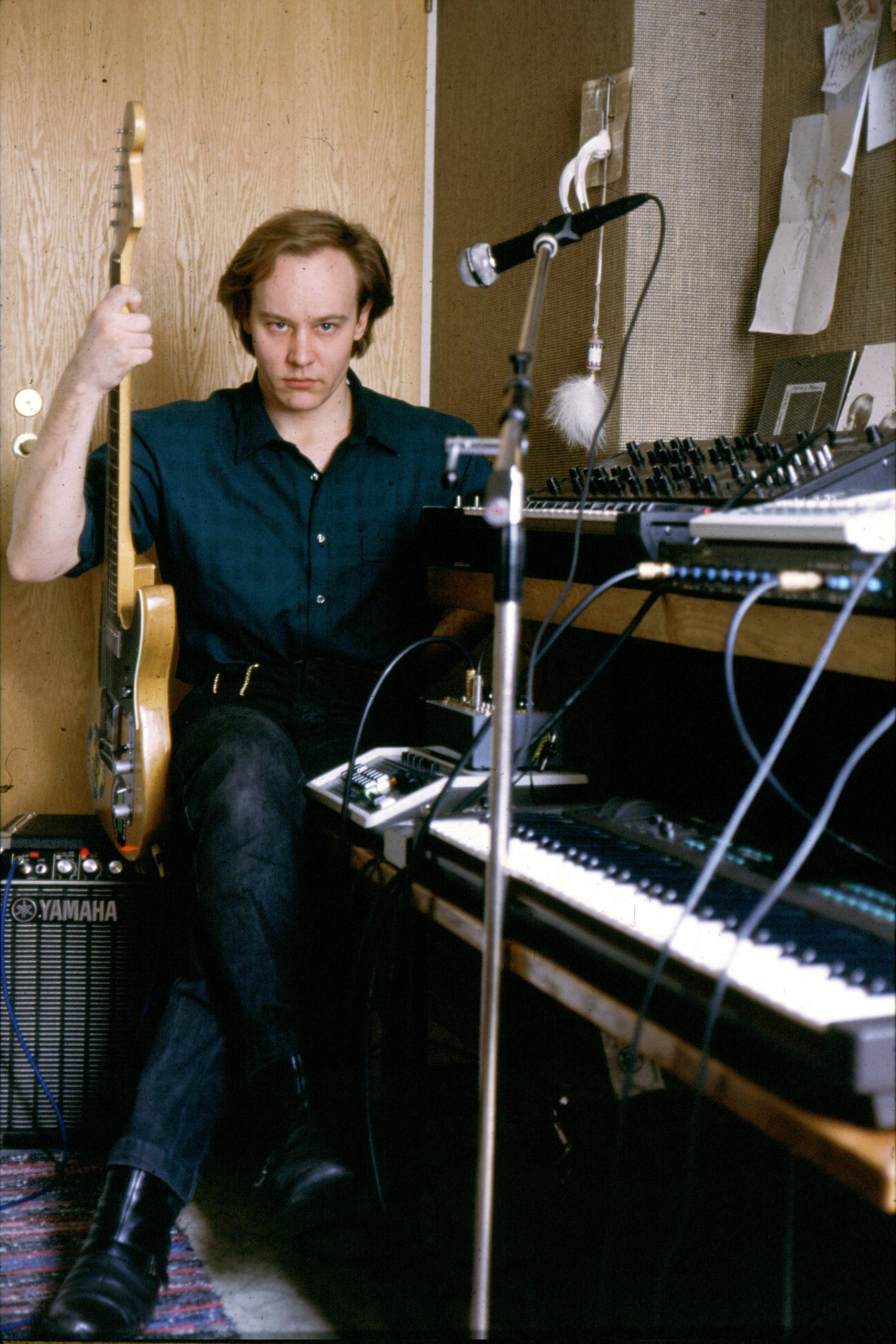
Juha Kaarsalo aka Johnny Spunky

Johnny Spunky (November 16, 1958 in Turku), real name Juha Kaarsalo, is a Finnish musician, songwriter and author. His early synthesizer works were published by the Finnish record label Hiljaiset Levyt ("silent records") in Tampere, Finland, and brought to an international audience by John Peel. His trio's full name was Johnny Spunky's Guts but they performed under Johnny Spunky mainly. Later he started a solo career.

Kaarsalo finished his studies in late 1988 at the University of Helsinki and mastered in Finnish literature in 1989. His thesis dealt with the meaning of music in the radio plays of Pirkko Jaakola. Kaarsalo published several books of poetry in Finnish. He also wrote about ornithology and art history in calendars by the publisher Von Wright from 1994 to 2001. His essays about architecture, literature and especially music were published primarily in three magazines and periodicals: Rytmi, musa.fi and Selvis. Kaarsalo is a member of the Finnish Composers organisation Säveltäjät ja Sanoittajat ELVIS ry. In winter 2006 he suffered a serious pneumonia. Kaarsalo is unmarried and lives in Loimaa.

The early works from 1987 to 1988 are being digimastered and will be released on CD in 2009.

== Discography ==
Own editions

- Sonic Psychobody, Cassette, 1986
- Lunar Power, EP, Hiljaiset Levyt HIKS-006, 1987
- My Second Coming, EP, Hiljaiset Levyt HIKS-012, 1989
- Mutatio vitalis, EP, Hiljaiset Levyt HIKS-022, 1990
- Shades of Things to Come, CD, Pinke 1, 1995

Compilations

- Avzaltti (LP, 1987)
- Maanalainen vuosikerta (LP, Stigma 1989)
- Sivulliset (4 CD, Poko/EMI 2005)

== Bibliography ==
- Ajan kuristus (Hiljainen Kulttuuriyhdistys 1988)
- Perillä ennen lähtöä (1988)
- Legenda German Elsassilaisesta (long poem in the anthology "Loivan Maan Saga", Ooli 1999)
- Ajatusten maisemissa (Ooli 2000)
- Apollon valo (Kustannus HD, 2006)
- Sampsan alueen historia (Kustannus HD, 2007)
- Kohti outoa totuutta (Kustannus HD, 2008)
- Tapio Laurila ja iloinen peli - musiikkimiehen muotokuva (Kustannus HD, 2008)
