= Joel Lehtonen =

Finnish writer, translator, critic and journalist

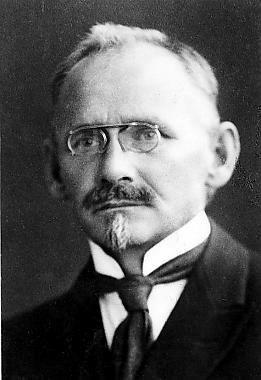
Joel Lehtonen in 1920

Joel Lehtonen (27 November 1881 – 20 November 1934) was a Finnish author, translator, critic and journalist. He was born in Sääminki (now part of Savonlinna). His childhood was fatherless and poverty-stricken, his mother suffered from mental frailties and Lehtonen himself was forced into paupery. Lehtonen's foster mother supported his schooling. He was able to study literature for a few years in the University of Helsinki, but dropped out without completing a degree.

As an author, he began as a neoromanticist, but after the Finnish Civil War his outlook transformed into deep pessimism and disenchanted scepticism.

Having suffered for years from various ailments, he committed suicide by hanging himself with a rope, that had been used to wrap up a parcel of books, in November 1934.

== Bibliography ==
- Paholaisen viulu (1904)
- Perm (1904)
- Mataleena (1905)
- Villi (1905)
- Tarulinna : Suomen kansan satuja Suomen lapsille (1906)
- Myrtti ja alppiruusu (1911)
- Rakkaita muistoja (1911)
- Punainen mylly (1913)
- Kerran kesällä (1917)
- Kuolleet omenapuut (1918)
- Putkinotkon metsäläiset (1919)
- Putkinotkon herrastelijat (1920)
- Rakastunut rampa eli Sakris Kukkelman, köyhä polseviikki
- Sorron lapset (1923)
- Punainen mies (1925)
- Lintukoto (1929)
- Hyvästijättö lintukodolle, (1934)
