= Susanne Ringell =

Finnish writer and actress (born 1955)

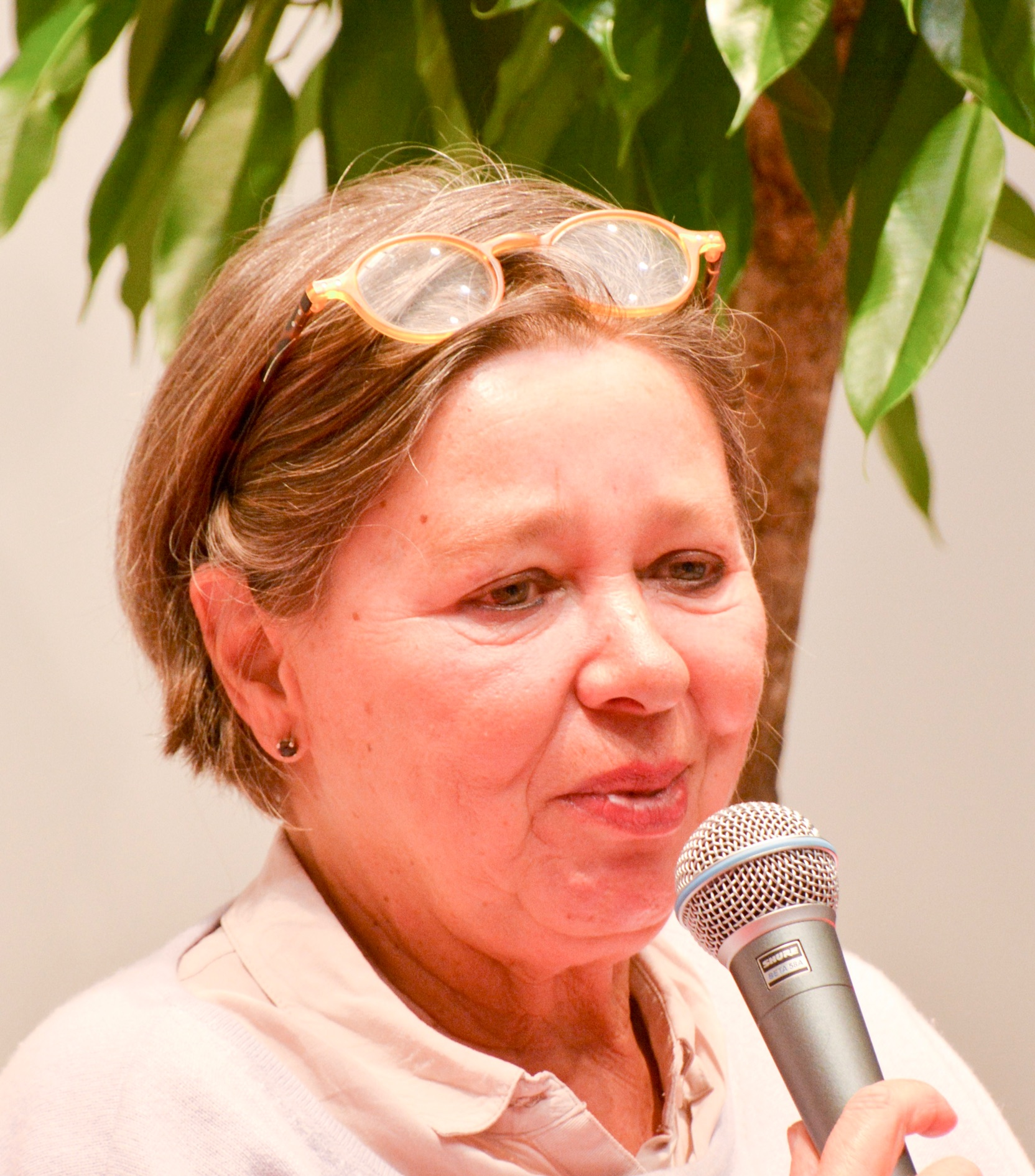
Susanne Ringell (2017)

Susanne Gun Emilia Ringell (28 February 1955, Helsinki) is a Finnish writer and actress. She graduated from Helsinki Theatre Academy as an actor in 1981 and has mainly worked as a freelance actor and writer. Her only permanent employment has been at the Swedish Theatre in 1981–1983. Ringell's husband was actor-writer Anders Larsson (1952–2021). Ringell was granted an artist's pension in 2019.

== Awards and honours ==
- 1994 – Granberg-Sumeliuska prize for Det förlovade Barnet
- 1995 – Prix Italia main prize for Vestalen
- 1998 – Award of the Society of Swedish Literature in Finland for the short story collection Åtta kroppar
- 2004 – Prix Europa Radio France for Och om bettlare och vägmän
- 2004 – Svenska Litteratursällskapet society award for the novel Katt begraven
- 2008 – Hugo Bergroth Award
- 2010 – Svenska Yle's literary award for Vattnen
- 2010 – Bergbom prize of the Society of Swedish Literature in Finland
- 2015 – Award of the Society of Swedish Literature in Finland

== Selected works ==
- Det förlovade barnet (short stories, 1993)
- Vestalen: Ett radioporträtt med störningar (1994)
- Gall eller Våra osynliga väntrum: En berättelse i sviter (1994)
- Vara sten (1996)
- Åtta kroppar (1998)
- Av blygsel blev Adele fet: Alfabetiska nedslag (short stories, 2000)
- Katt begraven (novel, 2003)
- En god Havanna: Besläktat (short stories, 2006)
- Ryggens nymåne: Prosalyrisk svit (2009)
- Simma näck: En pjäs (2009)
- Vattnen (short stories, 2010)
- På utvägen var jag en annan (2012)
- Guiden (2014)
- Tärnornas station (2014)
- God morgon (2017)
- Frimärken (2019)
