= Edvin Wahlstén =

Finnish politician (1872–1945)

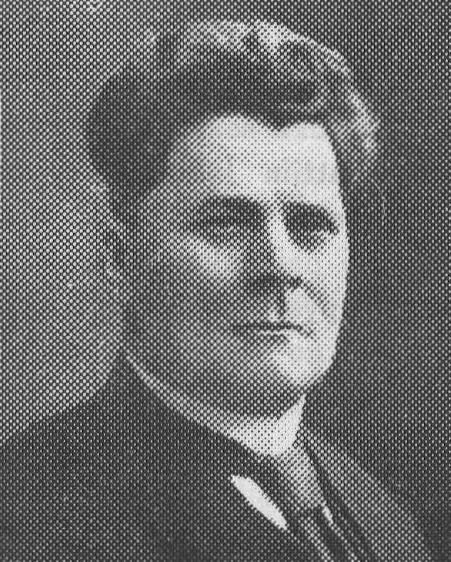
Member of the Parliament of Finland Edvin Wahlstén (1872-1945).

Edvin Gregorius Wahlstén (2 March 1872, Turku - 15 December 1945) was a Finnish journalist, civil servant, attorney and politician. He was a member of the Parliament of Finland from 1926 to 1927, representing the Social Democratic Party of Finland (SDP).
