= Virpi Hämeen-Anttila =

Finnish researcher, translator, illustrator and writer

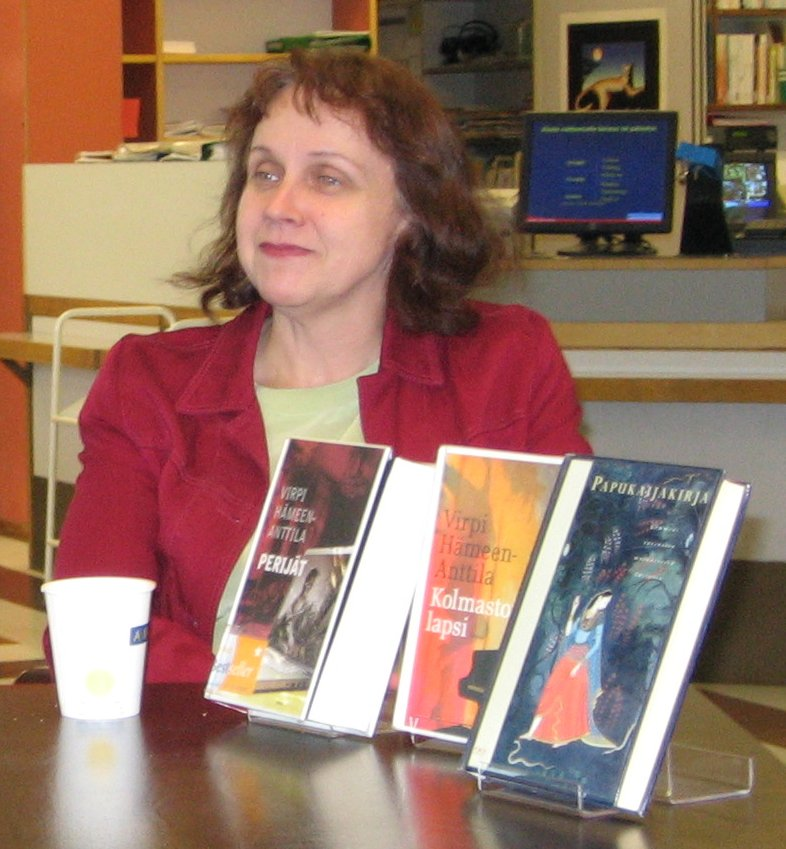
- Hämeen-Anttila at the Jakomäki library in 2007.
- Born: October 15, 1958; Espoo, Finland
- Education: University of Helsinki
- Spouses: Jaakko Hämeen-Anttila
- Writing career
- Language: Finnish
- Notable awards: Eino Leino Prize (2002)

Virpi Hämeen-Anttila (born 15 October 1958 in Espoo) is a Finnish writer, translator, and researcher. She was the recipient of the Eino Leino Prize in 2002 along with her husband Jaakko Hämeen-Anttila, for their work in translating and promoting multicultural literature. In addition to being a best-selling novelist, she is a translator and non-fiction writer. She also teaches Sanskrit and the history of Indian art at Helsinki University.

== Works ==
Hämeen-Anttila has written eleven novels, a series of four detective novels set in Helsinki in the 1920s, and a series of three youth novels (together with her daughter Maria Hämeen-Anttila). She has also translated Indian literature and poetry. Her first novel Suden vuosi (2003) was turned into a film by the same name in 2007.

== Awards ==
In 2002 Hämeen-Anttila and her husband were awarded the Eino Leino Prize. In 2004 she was named "Researcher of the Year" (Vuoden tieteentekijä) by the Finnish Union of University Researchers and Teachers. In 2008 she and her husband received the city of Vantaa Cultural Prize.

== See also ==
- Virpi Hämeen-Anttila in 375 humanists – 22 May 2015. Faculty of Arts, University of Helsinki.
