= Aleksanteri Institute =

Coordinates: 60.1722°N 24.9509°E

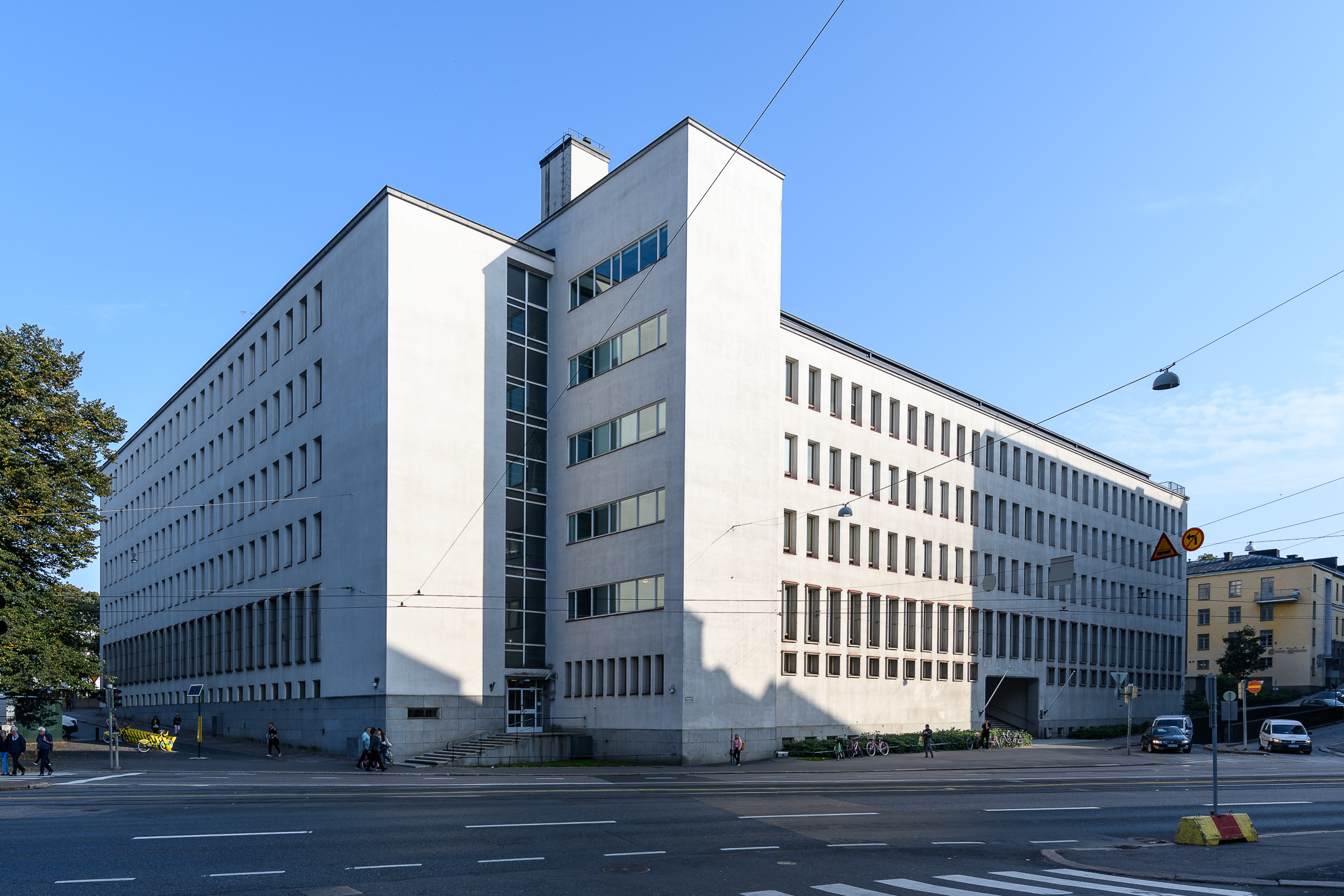
Aleksanteri Institute is located in the City Centre Campus of the University of Helsinki.

The Aleksanteri Institute (Finnish: Aleksanteri-instituutti) is the Finnish Centre for Russian, Eastern European and Eurasian Studies in the Faculty of Arts of the University of Helsinki. It functions as a national centre of research, study and expertise pertaining to Russia, Eastern Europe and Eurasia, particularly in the social sciences and humanities. The Institute actively promotes cooperation and interaction between the academic world, public administration, business life and civil society, both in Finland and abroad.

The Aleksanteri Institute was founded in 1996 and currently employs more than 50 scholars and administrative staff. The director of the institute is Dr. Anna-Liisa Heusala.

== Centre of Excellence in Russian Studies ==
The Aleksanteri Institute coordinated the Finnish Centre of Excellence in Russian Studies – Choices of Russian Modernisation for the period 2012–2017. The multi-disciplinary CoE was led by Markku Kivinen and it was funded by the Academy of Finland.

== Research ==
Research at the Aleksanteri Institute concentrates on six focus areas:

1. Economic Diversification
2. The Welfare Society
3. Democracy
4. Foreign Policy
5. The Social Constitution of Culture
6. The Cold War and its Consequences

The institute coordinates and participates in research projects and networks involving scholars from all over the world. In 2012 it was granted a five-year funding for a Finland Distinguished Professor (FiDiPro) project. Since 2008 it has also hosted a programme for visiting scholars. The programme offers international scholars (holding a PhD) a one-to-three-month research stay at the Aleksanteri Institute and the University of Helsinki. In addition to Russia, Eastern Europe and Scandinavia, scholars from Spain, Italy, the US, Britain, Canada, France and China have also attended.

== The Aleksanteri Conference ==
The Aleksanteri Conference is an annual conference of Russian and Eastern European studies organised in late October in Helsinki. The theme of the conference changes every year. The recent themes include:

- 2023 Decolozing Space in the Global East
- 2022 The New Era of Insecurity
- 2021 Eurasia and Global Migration
- 2019 Technology, Culture, and Society in the Eurasian Space
- 2018 Liberation – Freedom – Democracy? 1918–1968–2018

== Study programmes ==
The Aleksanteri Institute coordinates multi-disciplinary study programmes at various academic levels. The doctoral programme and the Master's School in Russian and Eastern European studies are open to students from Finnish universities. There is also a study programme for East Central Europe, Balkan and Baltic studies that offers the possibility of a MA diploma and a minor subject programme of Ukrainian studies.
