= Writers in Finland 1809–1916 =

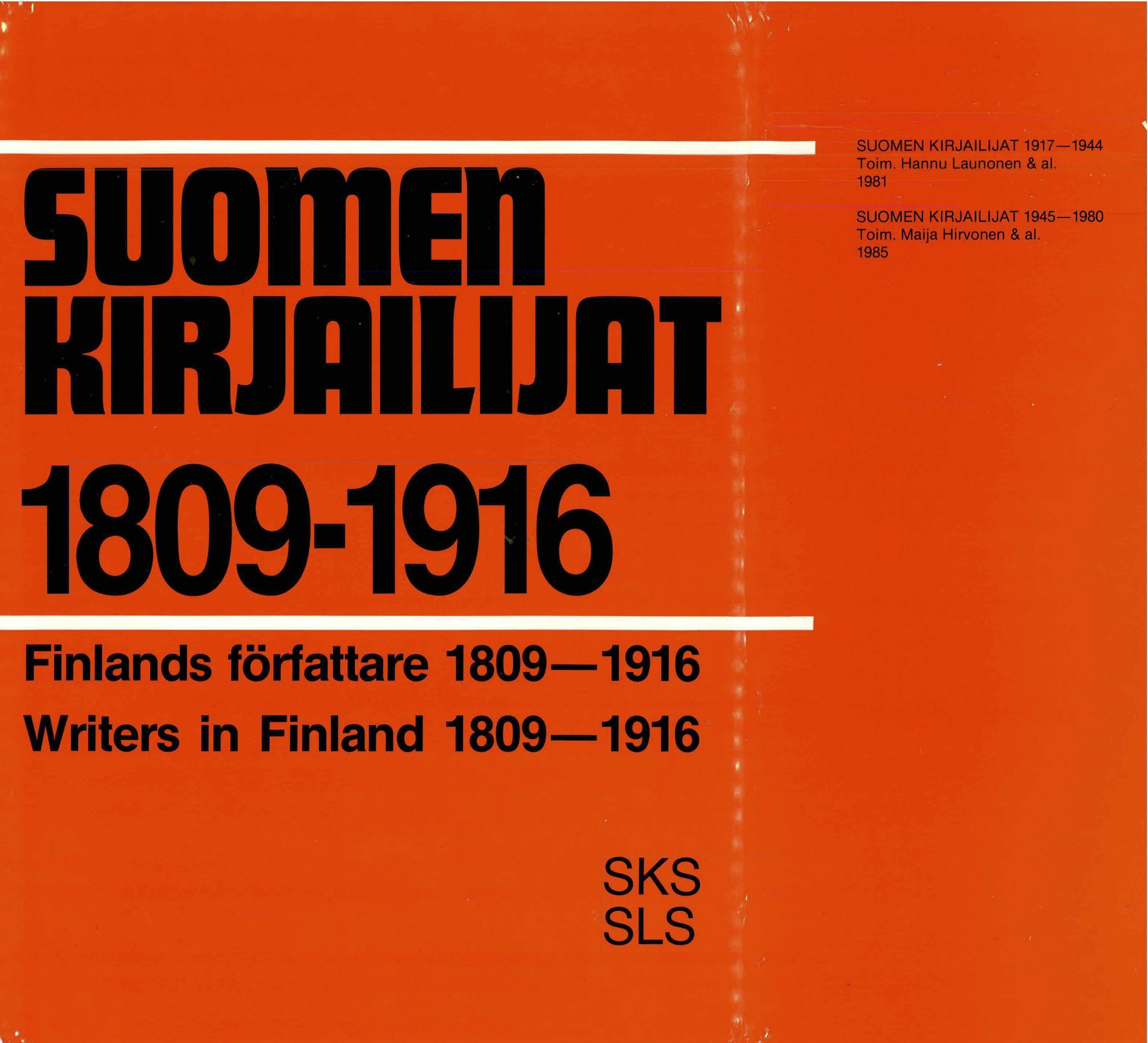
- Author: Various
- Language: Finnish and Swedish
- Subject: Biographies
- Genre: Reference work
- Publisher: Finnish Literature Society and Society of Swedish Literature in Finland
- Publication date: 1993
- Publication place: Finland
- Pages: 954
- Followed by: Writers in Finland 1917–1945

Writers in Finland 1809–1916 (Finnish: Suomen kirjailijat 1809–1916; Swedish: Finlands författare 1809–1916) is a biographical dictionary that includes writers in Finland during the Grand Duchy of Finland (1809–1916), when Finland was an autonomous part of the Russian Empire. It was published in 1993 as a collaboration between the Finnish Literature Society (Suomalaisen Kirjallisuuden Seura) and the Society of Swedish Literature in Finland (Svenska litteratursällskapet i Finland). The volume includes 1,471 writers across 954 pages and is considered to be one of "the two most important works" on the subject.

== Contents and scope ==
=== Selection criteria ===
The work includes Finnish writers who published in either Finnish or Swedish and began their literary activity between 1809 and 1916. Authors who started as early as 1800–1808 are also included if their principal output dates from after 1809.

In addition to authors of fiction, the work also covers:

- Translators
- Writers of travelogues, memoirs, and religious literature
- Authors of war literature
- Cultural historians and literary scholars

The number of pages in the publications has not been a decisive factor in the selection. Among those included are:

- Central poets of the period, even if they did not publish separate works
- Newspaper contributors and folk writers
- Individuals who wrote for calendars and other publications
- Adaptors and translators

For the period after the 1860s, when the Finnish language and literature had achieved an established status, gradually stricter selection criteria were applied. Authors who emigrated have also been included, provided that at least one of their works was published in Finland.

=== Information provided ===
For individual authors, the following are presented:

- Biographical information on background, education, and career
- A bibliography of the author's central works in chronological order
- Information on pamphlets and newspaper articles
- Translations and editorial work
- Contributions to anthologies
- Reviews of the works
- Source literature and articles about the author

== Series ==
This volume is part of a larger series, alongside:

- Writers in Finland 1917–1944
- Writers in Finland 1945–1980

All three volumes are maintained in a searchable database by the Finnish Literature Society and are continually updated.

== Editorial team ==
The editorial board included Maija Hirvonen, Lars Huldén, Simo Konsala, Kai Laitinen, Rauni Puranen, and Johan Wrede. Contributing institutions included the Helsinki University Library, the Finnish Literature Society’s library and literary archive, the Brage Society (Föreningen Brage), and the Central Organization for Finnish Theatre.

== Reception ==
Writing for Historical Abstracts in 1995, R.G. Selleck called Writers in Finland 1809–1916 an "excellent biographical encyclopedia" based on government documents and published sources. Selleck added that it "has fortunately been unaffected" by "the confidentiality provisions of the personal registry act of 1987", which had raised issues for other biographical reference works that had recently been published in Finland.

== Sources ==
- Hannu, Marttila (24 March 1993). "Autonomian ajan matrikkelissa on 2000 kirjailijaa" [There are 2,000 writers in the registry during the period of autonomy]. Helsingin Sanomat (in Finnish).
