= Kari Aartoma =

Finnish poet, translator and columnist (1958–2024)

- Born: July 12, 1958; Finland
- Died: June 24, 2024 (aged 65); Finland
- Occupations: Poet, writer, translator, columnist
- Writing career
- Language: Finnish
- Years active: 1999–2024
- Genres: Poetry, fiction
- Notable works: Pilvet eivät pidä mistään kiinni (1999); Kahden Joen Kaupunki (2019)
- Literary movement: Hellät elätit (poetry group)

Kari Aartoma (12 July 1958 – 24 June 2024) was a Finnish poet, writer, translator and columnist.

== Life and career ==
Aartoma was born on 12 July 1958. He lived in Turku, Finland. His first work, Pilvet eivät pidä mistään kiinni (Clouds Do Not Stick To Anything), was published in 1999 by Nihil Interit.

He was a member of the poetry group Hellät elätit.

His 2019 novel, Kahden Joen Kaupunki (A City of Two Rivers), deals with alcoholism. Aartoma, a self-described alcoholic, spent eight years writing the novel.

Aartoma died on 24 June 2024, at the age of 65.

== Works ==
- Clouds Do Not Stick To Anything (Pilvet eivät pidä mistään kiinni), Nihil Interit 1998
- Concrete Schubert (Betonischubert), Sammakko 2001
- Hetero, Sammakko 2005
- The City of Two Rivers (Kahden Joen Kaupunki)
