= Toivo Pekkanen =

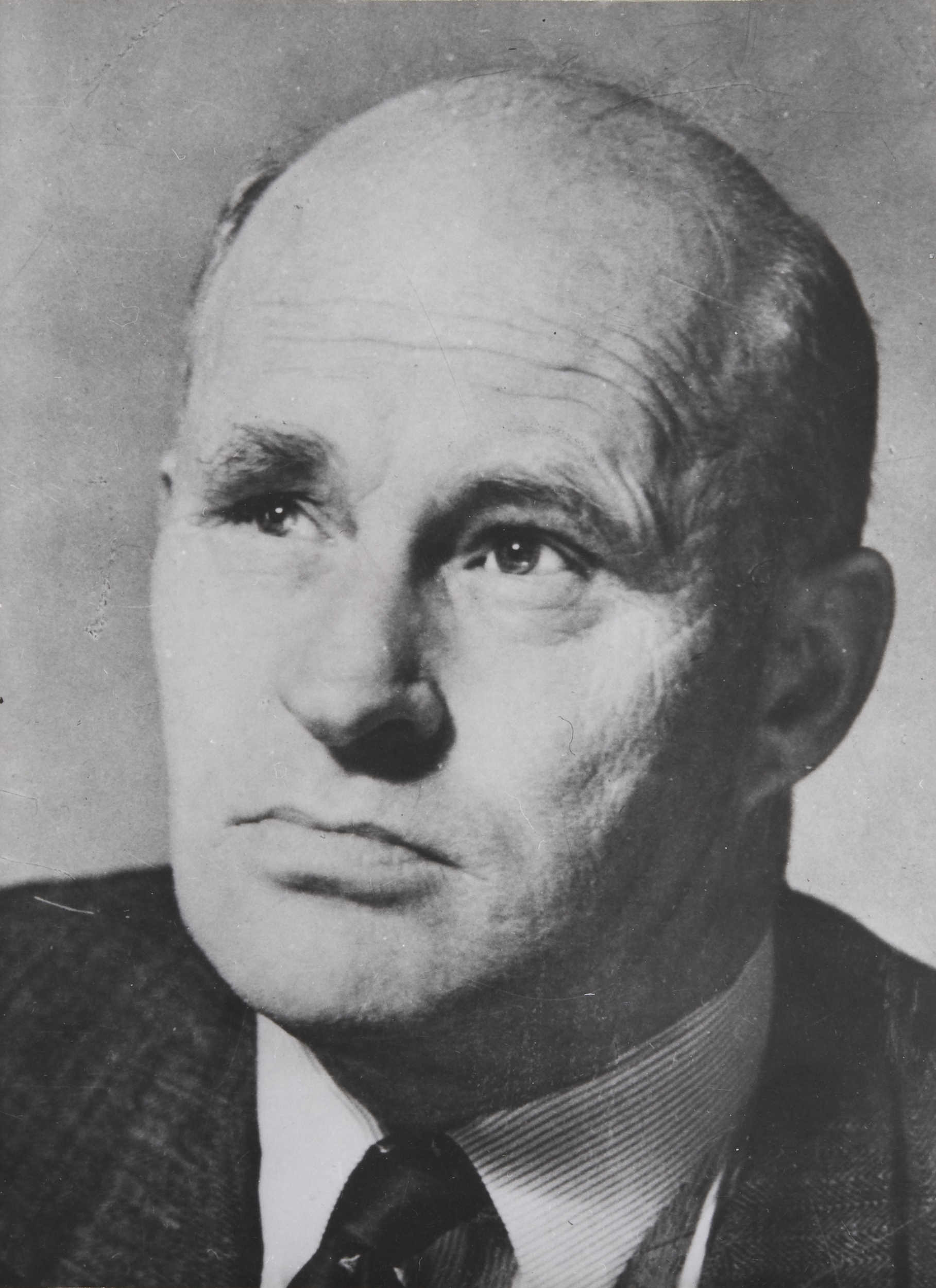
- Born: 10 September 1902; Kotka, Finland
- Died: 30 May 1957 (aged 54); Copenhagen, Denmark

Toivo Rikhart Pekkanen (10 September 1902 Kotka, Finland – 30 May 1957 Copenhagen, Denmark) was a writer from Finland.

He was a working class writer without much formal education and is notable for being the first member of the working class to make a living from writing. The Pekkas Award has been established in his honor.

Pekkanen's breakthrough work Tehtaan varjossa (1932, in Shadow of the factory) describes realistically but dispassionately the living conditions of the working class. The hero, Samuel Oino, educates himself to get a better life - much like Pekkanen himself. His second well known book is the autobiographical Lapsuuteni (1953, My Childhood), about his poor childhood years. The Finnish Civil War is seen from the Reds' side but without bitterness.

Pekkanen was in Copenhagen, Denmark, improving his health, when he died from a brain hemorrhage.

== Works ==
- Rautaiset Kädet (Iron Hands), short story collection (1927)
- Satama ja Meri (The Harbor and the Sea), short story collection (1929)
- Kuolemattomat (The Immortals), short story collection (1931)
- Tientekijät (The Road Builders), novel (1930)
- Tehtaan Varjossa (In the Shadow of the Factory), novel (1932)
- Sisarukset (The Brothers and Sisters), play (1933)
- Kauppiaiden Lapset (Shopkeeper's Children), novel (1934)
- Ihmisten Kevät (Human Spring), novel (1935)
- Takaisin Austraaliaan (Back to Australia), play (1936)
- Isänmaan Ranta (My Country's Shores), novel (1937)
- Ukkosen Tuomio (The Judgement of Thunder), play (1937)
- Raukkaus ja Raha (Money and Love), play (1937)
- Demoni (The Demon), play (1939)
- Musta Hurmio (Black Ectasy), novel (1939)
- Ne Menneet Veuodet (Those Past Years), novel (1940)
- Elämän ja Kuoleman Pidot (The Feast of Life and Death), short story collection (1945)
- Jumalan Myllyt (The Mills of God), novel, rewrite of Meneet Vuodet (1946)
- Nuorin Veli (The Youngest Brother), novel (1946)
- Aamuhämärä (Dawn), novel (1948)
- Toverukset (Companions), novel (1948)
- Voittajat ja voitetut (The Victors and the Defeated), novel (1952)
- Lapsuuteni (My Childhood), memoir (1953)
- Lähtö matkalle (Departure for a Trip), collection of poems (1955)
