= Riikka Pulkkinen =

Finnish author (born 1980)

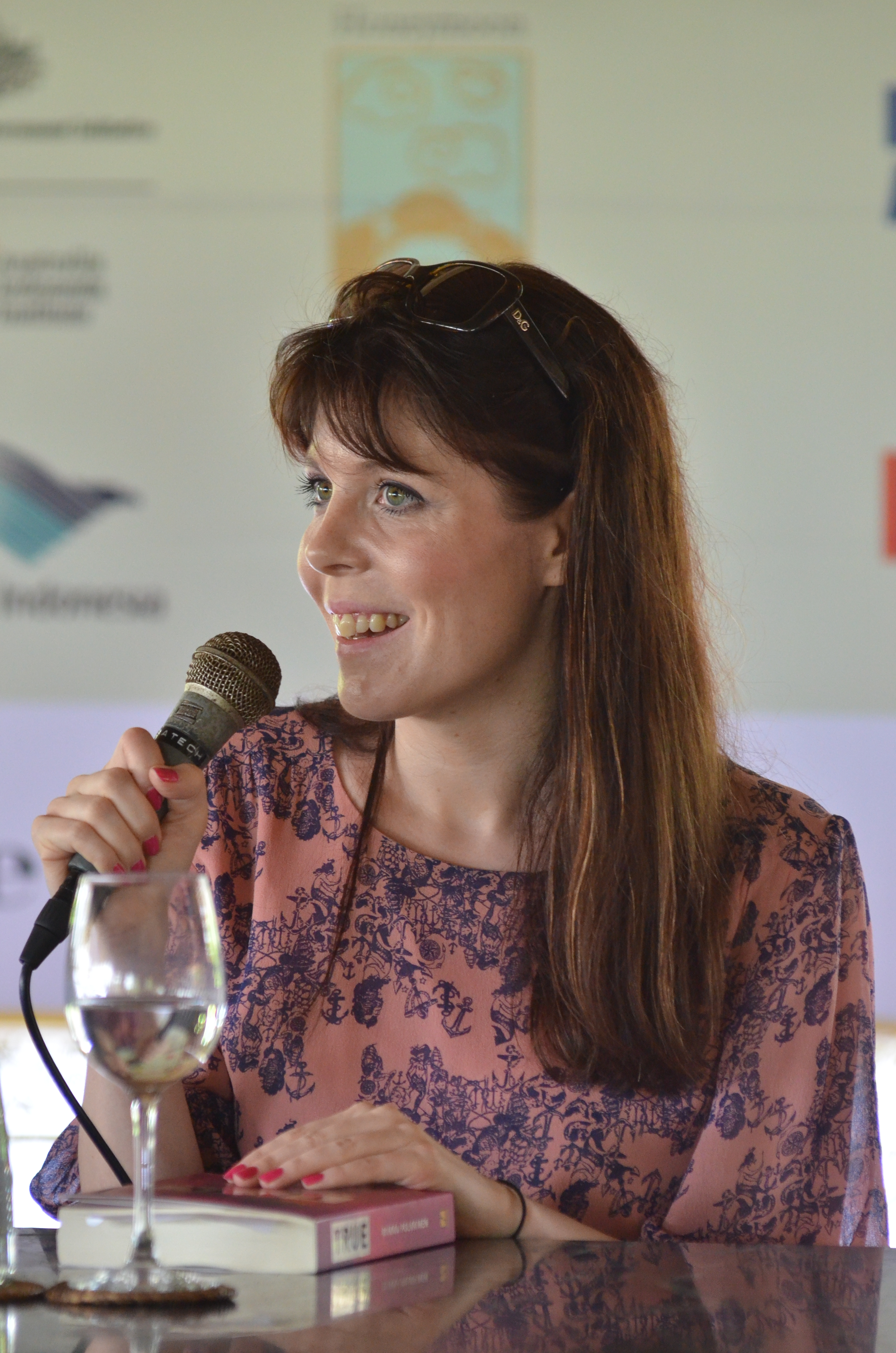
Riikka Pulkkinen

Riikka Pulkkinen (born 8 July 1980) is a Finnish author, who has published six novels. Pulkkinen, currently living in Helsinki, was born and raised in Oulu in North Finland. She gained wide international attention with her second novel, True.

== Life ==
Pulkkinen was born in Oulu, a city in northern Finland, into a family of a lawyer and a doctor as parents. She studied literature and theoretical philosophy in the University of Helsinki. She has a daughter born in 2013 with Erkki Perälä, a politician of Green League.

== Career ==
Pulkkinen's first novel, The Limit, has been translated into eight languages: Armenian, Danish, Dutch, English, Estonian, German, Italian, Swedish. Her second novel, True, was shortlisted for the Finlandia Fiction Prize of 2010 and it received significant national and international attention. It has been translated into 15 languages. The translation rights of the third novel, The Book of Strangers, have been sold in five countries. Pulkkinen also writes columns for various magazines in Finland.

== Selected works ==
- Raja (The Limit), 2006.
- Totta (True), 2010.
- Vieras (The Book of Strangers), 2012.
- Iiris Lempivaaran levoton ja painava sydän (Iiris Lempivaara's Restless Heart), 2014.
- Paras mahdollinen maailma (The Best Possible World), 2016.
- Lasten planeetta (The Planet of Children), 2018.
- Lumo (The Enchantment), 2022
