= Tuuve Aro =

Finnish author

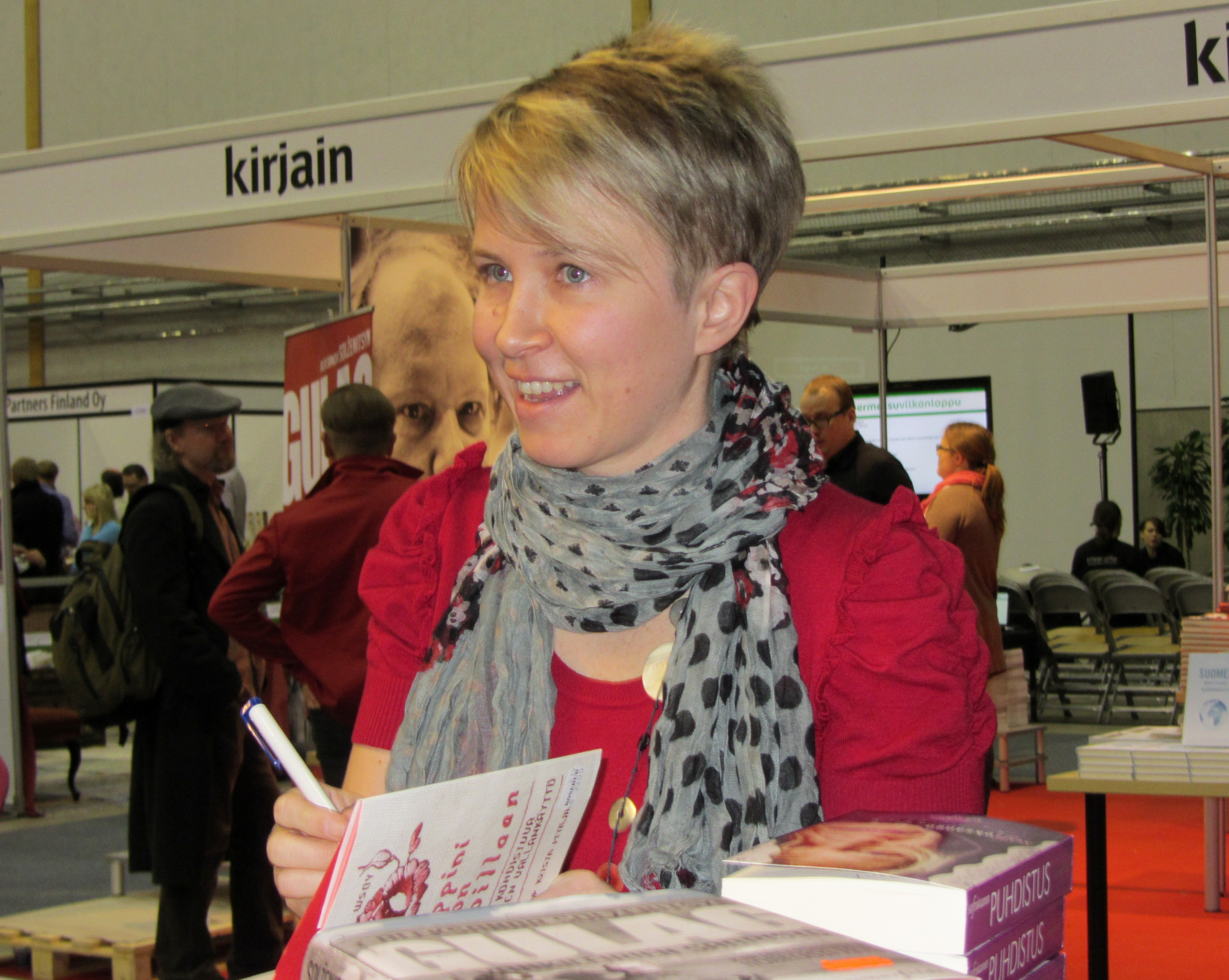
Finnish writer Tuuve Aro signing her books at Tampere Book Fair 2012.

Tuuve Aro is a Finnish author, who was born and lives in Helsinki. Alongside her work as a writer, she has worked as a film critic and has also done some film producing. Her first book appeared in 1999, and she has published a total of eleven fiction books, six of which are short story collections, three novels and two children's novels. Her debut novel Karmiina (2004) and collection of short stories have been translated into German (Kookbooks, Suhrkamp).

Aro's literary works have also been published in English, Swedish, Russian, Hungarian, Polish, Serbian, Romanian, and Bengali. The short story collection Merkki (The Sign) received the Kalevi Jäntti book award 2006. Its title story was made into a 15 min short film named Sirocco (Pohjola-filmi, directed by Mikko Kuparinen), which received the main prize in Odense International Film Festival and the Finnish Artova Film Festival 2013.

Although she has published long prose, Aro specializes in short stories both as a writer for magazines and anthologies and as an active speaker in national and international short story seminars and festivals. In 2016, Aro took part in the international Kikinda Short literature festival and a short story translation project in Serbia, Romania and Hungary. Aro's short story Before the Rain is a part of the Polish international anthology Masters of Stories about Women (Wielka Litera 2023) along with such names as Virginia Woolf, Margaret Atwood, and Tove Jansson.

Production:

- Harmia lämpöpatterista (Trouble with the Radiator), short prose (Gummerus 1999); published in German 2004 (Suhrkamp Verlag, translator Elina Kritzokat). Nominated for the Helsingin Sanomat Literature Prize.
- Sinikka Tammisen outo tyhjiö (The Strange Vacuum of Sinikka Tamminen), short stories (Gummerus 2001); published in German 2004 (Suhrkamp Verlag, translator Elina Kritzokat).
- Karmiina, novel (WSOY 2004); published in German 2008 (Karmiina K - Ich bin okay, Kookbooks Verlag, translator Elina Kritzokat).
- Merkki ja muita novelleja (The Sign), short stories (WSOY 2006); Kalevi Jäntti book award.
- Yöstä aamuun (From Night till Morning), novel (WSOY 2009).
- Topi & Tallulah: Korson purppuraruusu (Jungle Girl & the City), children's novel (WSOY 2011).
- Himokone (Desire Machine), short stories (WSOY 2012).
- Topi & tallulah: Karambolan kirous (City Boy & the Jungle), children's novel (WSOY 2013).
- Lihanleikkaaja (The Butcher and Other Stories), short stories (WSOY 2017).
- Kalasatama, (Fish Port), novel (WSOY 2020).
- Universumin takahuone, (The Big Back Room), short prose (Siltala 2023).
