= Markku Kivinen =

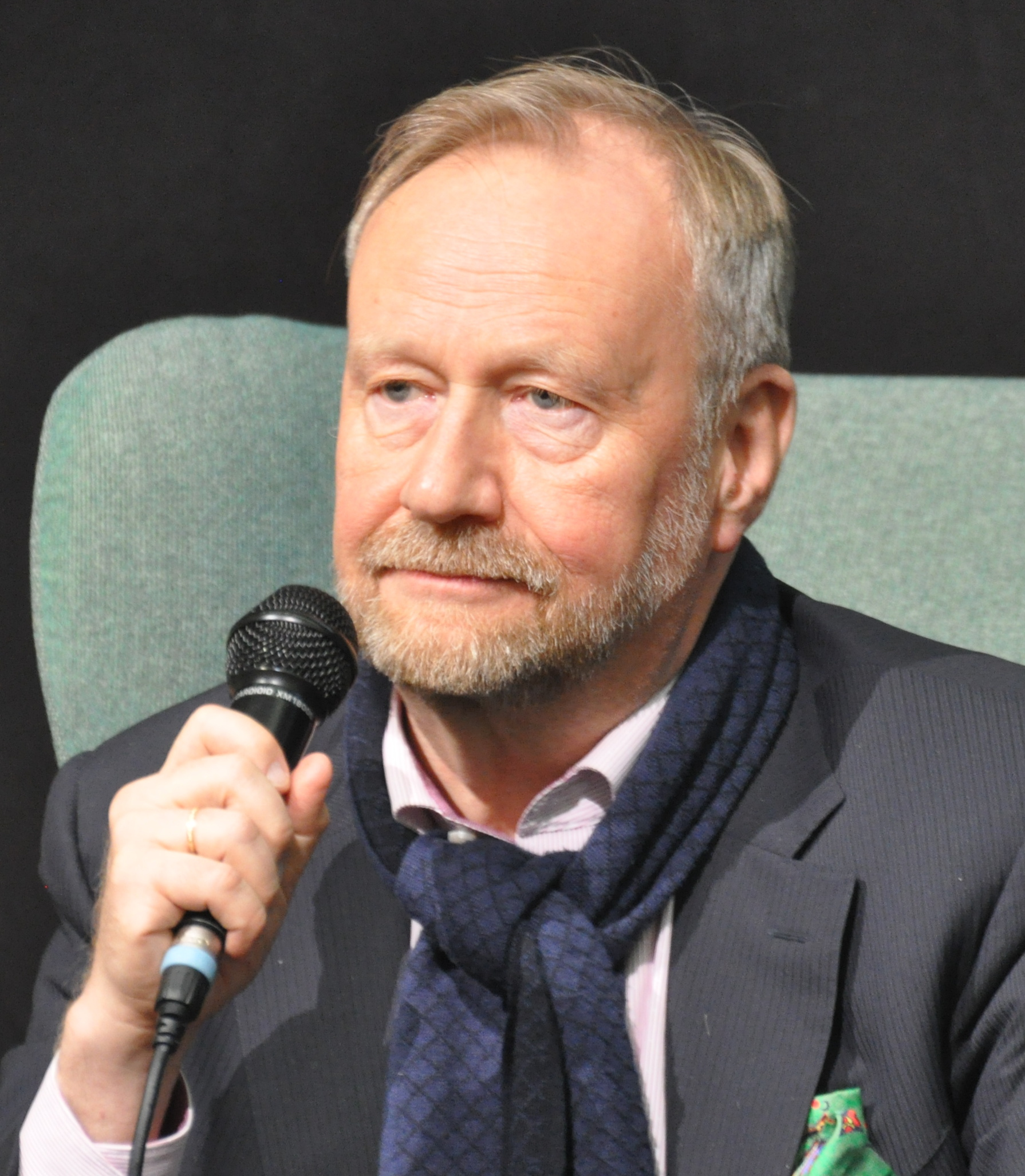
- Markku Kivinen
- Born: June 5, 1951; Helsinki, Finland
- Citizenship: Finnish
- Scientific career
- Fields: sociology, Russia
- Institutions: University of Helsinki, Aleksanteri Institute
- Website: The Aleksanteri Institute

Markku Jalmari Kivinen (born June 5, 1951 in Helsinki, Finland) is a professor of sociology and the director of the Aleksanteri Institute of the University of Helsinki, Finland, since 1996.

Kivinen's academic expertise is social theory, Russian domestic and foreign policy, transition studies in comparative perspective, social inequality, power and democracy, cultural structures and macro processes. He has more than 300 publications on key sociological topics. He is director of the Finnish Graduate School for Russian and East European Studies, as well as many research projects funded by the Academy of Finland, EU and NordForsk. Since 2012 Kivinen is leading one of the Academy of Finland's Centres of Excellence (CoE) in Research, "Choices of Russian Modernisation". Markku Kivinen is series editor of Studies of Contemporary Russia (Routledge). Kivinen has also published novels in Finnish: Betonijumalia in 2009, translated into German (Betongötter), and Lähetin loppupeli in 2016. Markku Kivinen was awarded Honorary Doctor of the Institute of Sociology of the Russian Academy of Sciences in 2011 and the City of Helsinki Research Prize in 2014.

== Books ==
- Luokkaprojekti: Suomalaiset luokkakuvassa. Vastapaino, Jyväskylä 1984, 620 p.
- Parempien piirien ihmisiä. Näkökulma uusiin keskiluokkiin. Tutkijaliiton julkaisusarja 46. Jyväskylä 1987, 279 p.
- Jukka Gronow & Elina Haavio-Mannila & Markku Kivinen & Markku Lonkila & Anna Rotkirch: Cultural Inertia and Social Change in Russia. University of Helsinki. 1987, 334 p.
- The New Middle Classes and the Labour Process. Class Criteria Revisited. Helsingin yliopisto 1989, Dissertation.
- Raimo Blom & Markku Kivinen & Harri Melin & Liisa Rantalaiho: The Scope Logic Approach to Class Analysis. Avebury. Aldershot 1992, 239 p.
- Markku Kivinen (ed.): The Kalamari Union. Middle Class in East and West. Ashgate. Aldershot 1998, 341 p.
- Progress and Chaos. Russia as a Challenge for Sociological Imagination. Kikimora Publications. Helsinki 2002, 272 p.
- Прогресс и хаос (Progress i khaos). Akademicheski proekt, Sankt-Peterburg 2001
- Markku Kivinen & Katri Pynnönniemi (ed.): Beyond the Garden Ring. Dimensions of Russian Regionalism. Kikimora Publications. Helsinki 2002, 264 p.
- Betonijumalia. Teos, 2009. ISBN 978-951-851-184-0 (novel)
- Perestroika and Left-Wing Fundamentalism – Model Variables of Previous Russian Modernisation. New interpretations Russian history. Contemporary History Foundation. Moscow 2011.
- Betongötter. Secession Verlag für Literatur, 2014. ISBN 978-3-905951-43-1 (novel)
- Lähetin loppupeli. Helsinki: Teos, 2016. ISBN 978-951-851-696-8 (novel)
