= Outi Alanne =

Finnish writer

- Born: Outi Alanne; 4 May 1967 (age 59); Oulu, Finland
- Education: University of Helsinki
- Writing career
- Pen name: NeitiNaru; NeitiN
- Language: Finnish
- Period: 2000s
- Subject: Sadomasochism

Outi Alanne (born 4 May 1967) is a Finnish writer, also known by the pseudonym NeitiNaru.

Alanne was born in Oulu. In 1995, she started studying literature, art history, Finnish language and theatre in the University of Helsinki. As a student she also worked as an intern archiver at the Finnish Literature Society. In her thirties, after a period of introspection following the divorce from a failed relationship, she found herself in a new relationship with a dominant male, and discovered her masochist self.

In 2000, she started a website called NeitiNarun Ihmeellinen Huone (MissNaru's Wonderful Room), where she discussed sadomasochistic sexuality under her pseudonym, until in 2002 she published an autobiographical novel called Neiti N:n tarina (Miss N's story), which earned her the "Year's Kinkiest Performance" award by the cultural society Rsyke the following year.

Alanne has also served as chairman of the BDSM organisation SMFR, founded in Helsinki, between 2002 and 2004.

== Bibliography ==
- 2002 Neiti N:n tarina ISBN 951-0-27448-8
- 2006 Giljotiini ISBN 951-0-32078-1
