= Pirjo Hassinen =

Finnish writer (born 1957)

Pirjo Hassinen (born 14 November 1957) is a Finnish writer. Her novels have been translated into several languages including German and Norwegian. She has also written under the pen name of Birgitta Hurme. Born in Kuopio, Hassinen studied political science and philosophy at the University of Jyväskylä.

== Awards ==
Hassinen has received several awards including the State Literary Award (2001) and the Savonia Award (2013). The Savonia award for the best novel of the year was for Popula which describes various difficulties faced by Finns today, including unemployment, racism and the attitudes of the far right.
