= Uhritulet =

1993 historical novel by Kaari Utrio

- First edition
- Author: Kaari Utrio
- Language: Finnish
- Subject: Middle Age, love
- Genre: Historical fiction
- Publisher: Tammi
- Publication date: 1993
- Publication place: Finland
- Media type: Print (hardback, pocket book), audiobook
- Pages: 451 pp
- ISBN: 951-31-0258-0
- OCLC: 30845651

Uhritulet (Finnish: The Sacrificial Fires) is a 1993 historical novel by Finnish author Kaari Utrio. It is set in 14th century Finland. According to journalist Suvi Kerttula, Vaskilintu (1992), Tuulihaukka (1995) and Uhritulet are Utrio's most important works.

Uhritulet has been translated into Swedish (Offereldar, 1998).
