= Vehkalahden neidot =

1971 historical novel by Kaari Utrio

- Author: Kaari Utrio
- Language: Finnish
- Subject: Middle Age, love
- Genre: Historical fiction
- Publisher: Tammi
- Publication date: 1971
- Publication place: Finland
- Media type: Print (hardback, pocket book), audiobook
- OCLC: 636975075

Vehkalahden neidot (Finnish: The Maidens of Vehkalahti) is a 1971 historical novel by Finnish author Kaari Utrio.

The story is fiction that takes place in the mid-1400s and is set up in the context of squires of Vehkalahti, somewhat anachronistically since these local lords were in 1400s yet similar noblemen like others of the tax-exempt rälssi class of Sweden. Only later, between c. 1690 and 1784, their descendants, heirs, were the anomalously situated knaappi i.e. squire group.

== See also ==
- Vehkalahti § Peculiar Nobility
- Huusgafvel
- Poitz
