= Utrio =

Utrio is a surname. Notable people with the surname include:

- Kaari Utrio (born 1942), Finnish writer
- Meri Utrio (1919–2004), Finnish editor
