= Sunneva =

Sunneva may refer to:

- Sunneva Einarsdóttir (born 1990), Icelandic handball player
- Sunneva Jaarlintytär, novel
- Sunneva keisarin kaupungissa, novel
