= Iisalmen serkku ja muita kertomuksia =

1996 collection of historical literary works by Kaari Utrio

- First edition
- Author: Kaari Utrio
- Cover artist: John Everett Millais, The Black Brunswicker, 1860
- Language: Finnish
- Subject: The life of estate people and the smart set Helsinki in the 19th century as the background
- Genre: Historical fiction
- Publisher: Tammi
- Publication date: 1996
- Publication place: Finland
- Media type: Hardback, audiobook
- Pages: 558 pp
- ISBN: 951-31-0818-X

Iisalmen serkku ja muita kertomuksia (Finnish: The Cousin from Iisalmi and Other Tales) is a 1996 collection of historical literary works by Finnish author Kaari Utrio. The book includes the following seven works:

- Iisalmen serkku ("Cousin from Iisalmi", a novella)
- Luisa (a novella)
- Agneta rakastuu ("Agneta Falls in Love")
- Rakas Thea ("Dear Thea")
- Ihana köyhyys ("Lovely Poorness")
- Ruusukupit ("Rose Cups")
- Rautalilja ("Iron Lily", a republished novel)
