= Ruusulaakso =

1982 novel by Kaari Utrio

- First edition
- Author: Kaari Utrio
- Language: Finnish
- Genre: Romance novel
- Publisher: Tammi
- Publication date: 1982
- Publication place: Finland
- Media type: Print (hardback, pocket book), audiobook
- Pages: 337 pp
- ISBN: 951-30-5661-9
- OCLC: 12631633
- LC Class: MLCS 89/00825 (P)

Ruusulaakso (Finnish for: Rose Valley) is a 1982 novel by Finnish author Kaari Utrio. The novel is about rich Helsinkians in the 1980s, and it is Utrio's only novel that does not have a historical setting. The Finnish Women's Union included the novel in its list Kirjojen Top 101, that consists of best books written by women.
