= Viipurin kaunotar =

1973 novel by Kaari Utrio

- 1973 edition
- Author: Kaari Utrio
- Cover artist: Hannu Taina
- Language: Finnish
- Subject: Middle Age, love
- Genre: Historical fiction
- Publisher: Tammi
- Publication date: 1973
- Publication place: Finland
- Media type: Print (Hardback, pocket book)

Viipurin kaunotar (Finnish: The Beauty from Viipuri) is a historical novel by Finnish author Kaari Utrio.
