= The Spring of the Moonstone =

1995 historical romance novel by Kaari Utrio

- First edition
- Author: Kaari Utrio
- Original title: Kuukiven kevät
- Translator: Hildi Hawkins
- Illustrator: Marja Vehkala
- Language: Finnish
- Subject: The prehistoric Finland, love
- Genre: Historical fiction
- Publisher: Otava
- Publication date: 1995
- Publication place: Finland
- English publication date: 1995
- Media type: Hardback, audiobook (Finnish)
- Pages: 90 pp
- ISBN: 951-1-13743-3
- OCLC: 52961573

The Spring of the Moonstone (Finnish: Kuukiven kevät) is a 1995 historical romance novel by Finnish author Kaari Utrio. It is a romantic story from 11th century Finland, about love and hate and the meeting of two cultures. The book was published as a commemorative book for the 60th anniversary of the Kalevala Women's Association. The book contains several photographs and illustrations. In 1995, the novel was adapted into a play by Sarika Lipasti.

In 1995, The Spring of the Moonstone was translated into English by Hildi Hawkins. The novel has also been translated into Estonian (Kuukivi kevad, 1995).
