= Meri Utrio =

Meri Marjatta Utrio (née Vitikainen; 23 March 1919 – 14 December 2004) was a Finnish editor and translator.

== Personal life ==
She married Urho Untamo Utrio, who was the chief executive officer of Tammi publishing company and had three children with him: Kaari (1942–) Pirkka (1943–2000) and Martti (1945–). Kaari Utrio wrote over forty historical novels as well as non-fictional books that deal with the position of women and children in the history of Europe.

Utrio's sister, Pirkko Vitikainen, M.A. in Architecture, worked in the 1980s and 1900s as the City Planning Architect of Helsinki, the capital of Finland.

== Works ==
- Jack O'Brien: Silver Chief, Dog of the North (translation to Finnish 1957)
- Jack O'Brien: Silver Chief to the Rescue (translation to Finnish 1957)
- Jack O'Brien: The Return of Silver Chief (translation to Finnish 1958)
- Sata vuotta sitten 1886 (Finnish: One hundred years ago: 1886) (with her son-in-law Kai Linnilä; Tammi 1886)
- Pois pula, pois puute. Kun kansa selviytyi. (No more shortages, no more want. When Finland became self-sufficient) (with Urho Untamo Utrio)
- Silloin kerran kultaisina vuosina – elämä Suomessa vuosina 1944–1956 (The Golden Years – Life in Finland 1944–1956) (with Kai Linnilä and Kaari Utrio)
