= Pirkkalan pyhät pihlajat =

1976 historical romance novel by Kaari Utrio

- First edition
- Author: Kaari Utrio
- Language: Finnish
- Subject: Middle Age, love
- Genre: Historical fiction
- Publisher: Tammi
- Publication date: 1976
- Publication place: Finland
- Media type: Print (hardback, pocket book), audiobook
- Pages: 306 pp
- ISBN: 951-30-3877-7
- OCLC: 3433451
- LC Class: PH355.U76 P54
- Followed by: Karjalan kruunu

Pirkkalan pyhät pihlajat (Finnish: The Holy Rowan Trees of Pirkkala) is a historical romance novel by the Finnish author Kaari Utrio, first published in 1976.

The novel is divided into six parts. The first part sets the historical background from AD 800 to 1250 for the location of the holy rowan trees of Pirkkala. The other five parts each have their own first person narrator (Filippa, Aleidis Ragvaldintytär, Kaarle Kustaanpoika, Barbara Catillina and Tuomas Haukka, respectively). The parts are divided into chapters and concentrate on years AD 1280–1282 with flashbacks to earlier times.

The 2017 play Pirkkalan pihlajat, written by Olavi Horsma-aho and directed by Eriikka Magnusson, is based on the novel.
