= Burgher's Daughter =

Burgher's Daughter could refer to:

- Burger's Daughter
- Aatelisneito, porvaristyttö
