= Kaarina Multiala =

Kaarina Multiala (died after 1563 but before 1571), was a Finnish merchant. She is the earliest women merchant documented in the history of Finland.

In 1549, Kaarina Multiala is named as "Wife Muldiala", widow of Esko Multiala, and noted to be the wealthiest burgher merchant in Vyborg. Two years later, she is documented to have been the owner of several ships. She successfully exported butter, leather, and fish. During the 1550s, she was one of the eight richest taxpayer in Viborg, and was also noted to own a farm: in 1562, she also managed to have her farm freed from taxes, a privilege otherwise only granted to the nobility. The year of her death is not known: she is last mentioned alive in 1563, but was certainly dead in 1571, when a woman by the name of Elina Multiala, who was likely her daughter, was taxed for her silver.

She was one of extremely few businesswomen documented in Finland at the time, one of even fewer to also pay taxes for her own farm, and the only secular woman in 16th-century Finland to be noted in public records as anything other than a wife.

== Popular culture ==
Kaarina Multiala is portrayed in the novel Kartanonherra ja kaunis Kirstin by Kaari Utrio.

== See also ==
- Valpuri Innamaa
