= Ruma kreivitär =

2002 historical novel by Kaari Utrio

- Author: Kaari Utrio
- Language: Finnish
- Subject: Helsinki in the 19th century, love
- Genre: Historical fiction
- Publisher: Tammi
- Publication date: 2002
- Publication place: Finland
- Media type: Print (hardback, pocket book), audiobook
- Pages: 362 pp
- ISBN: 951-31-2537-8
- OCLC: 52668363

Ruma kreivitär (Finnish: The Ugly Countess) is a 2002 historical novel by Finnish author Kaari Utrio telling a story of poor aristocrats and richening middle-class in the 1830s Finland.

== Characters ==
- Conrad Gyllenfalk, the last count of Bössa, an impoverished Earl
- Julia Gyllenfalk, Conrad's eldest daughter, "The Ugly Countess"
- Dorotea Gyllenfalk, Conrad's youngest daughter, a beauty
- Anton Wendel, a tobacco manufacturer
- Hanna Wendel, Anton's aunt
- Filip Adelheim, a baron and official in the government
- Eleonora, his wife the baroness
- Augusta Adelheim, a beautiful, rich and noble lady in her twenties
- Otto Adelheim, a young baron
- Anders Granlund, a saddler master and prosperous burgher
- Stina Granlund, Anders's wife
- Carolina Lohm, a rich heiress from Stina's first marriage
- Christina Tybelia, a dowager, wealthy, and relative to Julia's and Dorothea's late mother
- Vladimir Tybelius, a yet more distant relation, Tybelia's step-grandson
- The Honourable Thomas Stanley, a younger son of the Earl of Highminster from London
- Karl Kynberg, a foreman in Wendel's tobacco factory
- Orlando Vargas, a cigar master from North America (probably with Cuban roots)
- Cecily Underhill Vargas, his wife, a dressmaker, from New England
- Clas Johan von Numers, an elderly (retired) Captain
- Wenzel Lorenz, an elderly (retired) Lieutenant of the Finnish Navy ekipaasi (equipage)
