= Homeperseensuo =

Bog in Hamina, Finland

Coordinates: 60.605°N 25.385°E

Homeperseensuo is a peatland located in Hamina (formerly Vehkalahti), Finland. It is located between the lakes Valkjärvi and Luotosenjärvi, at the border with Virolahti.

Homeperseensuo has an area of 26.9 hectares (66 acres), of which 24.3 hectares (60 acres) had been drained as of 1994. The first drainage ditches were dug in 1973. The peatland has a catchment area covering 98.6 hectares (244 acres).
