= Saippuaprinsessa =

2004 historical novel by Kaari Utrio

- Author: Kaari Utrio
- Language: Finnish
- Subject: Helsinki in the 19th century, love
- Genre: Historical fiction
- Publisher: Tammi
- Publication date: 2004
- Publication place: Finland
- Media type: Print (hardback, pocket book), audiobook
- Pages: 391 pp
- ISBN: 951-31-3088-6
- OCLC: 58351456

Saippuaprinsessa (Finnish: The Soap Princess) is a 2004 historical novel by Finnish author Kaari Utrio focusing on the frivolities of the high society in Helsinki, the capital of Grand Duchy of Finland in the 1830s.

== Characters ==
- Ulrika Rutenfelt, a rich heiress
- Mauritz Ekestolpe, a baron
- Detlev Henning, a millionaire from Livonia
- Eva Madgalena Ekestolpe, a dowager baroness, Mauritz's mother
- Viktoria von Sperling, a beauty, Mauritz's fiancée
- Herman von Sperling, Viktoria's brother
- Amanda Ekestolpe, Mauritz's sister
- Fredrik Ekestolpe, Mauritz's brother
- Kristian Bruun, Fredrik's tutor
- Axel Rutenfelt, His Excellency
- Olivia Rutenfelt, Her Ladyship
- Lemarchand, Her Ladyship's ladies' maid
- Natalie Fedorovna Bogatyrski-Gee, a Russian princess
- Sergei Zagoretski, an officer, Herman's friend
- Mr Grubbe, the solicitor of the Rutenfelts
- Frans Hukani, a friend of the Ekestolpe family
- Rosa Hukani, a divine cook
- Oskar Bong, the land agent of Ekestolpe family estate
- Katri Bong, a healer
- Anders Hipping, a rector
- Mr Lindgren, a cantor
- Strömmer, the driver of the Ekestolpe family
- Dahlgren, the butler of the Ekestolpe family
- Mrs Dahlgren, the housekeeper of the Ekestolpe family
- Tebell, the butler of the Rutenfelts
- Maja, a housemaid in the Rutenfelt Manor
- Old Mother Böök, Ulrika's chaperon
- Hjelt, the driver of the Rutenfelts
- Pelander, the driver of the von Sperlings
- General Governor Thesleff, the regent of the Grand Duchy of Finland
- Parfeni Maximovits Martynov, a Russian merchant
- Mrs Jägerskiöld, a Court Counsellor's wife
- Mrs von Löwen, a College Counsellor's wife
- Mrs Hampus, a Trade Counsellor's wife
- Lady Mellin, a baroness
- Mrs Hagemeister, a State Counsellor's wife
