= Rakas Henrietta =

1977 novel by Kaari Utrio

- First edition
- Author: Kaari Utrio
- Language: Finnish
- Subject: Helsinki in 1840s, love
- Genre: Historical fiction
- Publisher: Tammi
- Publication date: 1977
- Publication place: Finland
- Media type: Print (Hardback, pocket book)
- Pages: 270 pp
- ISBN: 951-643-113-5
- OCLC: 57866658

Rakas Henrietta (Finnish: My Dear Henrietta) is a historical novel by Finnish author Kaari Utrio.

It tells the story of Henrietta, the charming daughter of Lord Silfverhanen, who is still unmarried at 24, earning her the label of an "old maid". However, she has yet to find a man she enjoys spending time with, and her inheritance from Aunt Gyllensvärd ensures her financial security. Yet, in the 1840s, this inheritance limits her freedom—she cannot live alone, study, or travel. Feeling confined by society's rules, Henrietta longs to explore life beyond Helsinki's narrow circles.

Opportunity knocks with the arrival of the mysterious Marquis de Maury and the original explorer Count Fabian Adlercreutz, who both stir up social circles in the town. The novel delves into the lives and choices of women in the 19th century, exploring the experiences of various characters, including Henrietta's mother, sister, home teacher, and Count Fabian's sister Sophie.

Despite addressing serious themes, the work maintains a smoothly lighthearted tone. Originally published in 1977, this book belongs to the Kaarin kirjasto series and has been linguistically checked by the author.
