= Vendela =

Vendela is a feminine given name. It may refer to:

- Vendela Kirsebom, Turkish-Norwegian-Swedish model and actress
- Vendela Skytte, Swedish poet
- Vendela Vida, American novelist and journalist
- Vendela Zachrisson-Santén, Swedish competitive sailor and Olympic medalist

== See also ==
- Wendela
- Wendla
- Vendela (novel)
