= Ilkeät sisarpuolet =

2007 historical novel by Kaari Utrio

- Author: Kaari Utrio
- Language: Finnish
- Subject: Helsinki in the 19th century, love
- Genre: Historical fiction
- Publisher: Tammi
- Publication date: 3 October 2007
- Publication place: Finland
- Media type: Print (hardback, pocket book), audiobook
- ISBN: 978-951-31-3862-2
- OCLC: 231158630

Ilkeät sisarpuolet (Finnish: The Evil Half Sisters) is a 2007 historical novel by Finnish author Kaari Utrio. The novel is set on the coastal cities of Finland in the 1820s.
