= Kartanonherra ja kaunis Kirstin =

Book by Kaari Utrio

- Author: Kaari Utrio
- Cover artist: Otso Melkka
- Language: Finnish
- Subject: 16th century, love
- Genre: Historical novel
- Publisher: Tammi
- Publication date: 1968
- Publication place: Finland
- Media type: Print (Hardback, Pocket book)
- Pages: 381 pp
- ISBN: 951-31-1403-1
- OCLC: 58275936

Kartanonherra ja kaunis Kirstin (Finnish: The Lord of the Mansion and the Beautiful Kirstin) is a historical novel by Finnish author Kaari Utrio. It is a fictional account of Kaarina Multiala.
