= Valter Thomé =

Finnish architect

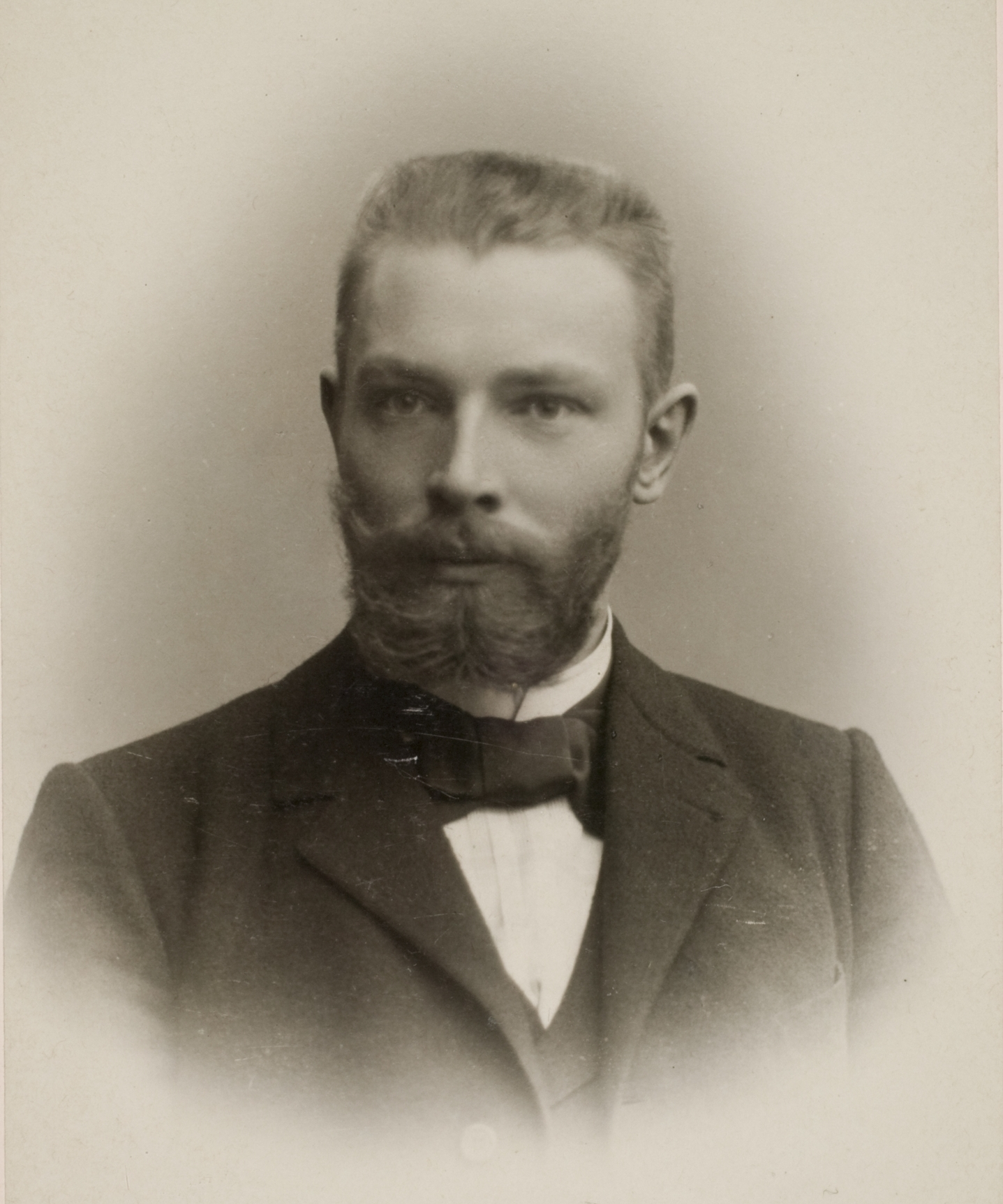
- Thomé in 1900
- Born: 5 August 1874; Pudasjärvi, Grand Duchy of Finland
- Died: 1 February 1918 (aged 43); Vihti, Finland
- Occupation: Architect

Valter Thomé (5 August 1874 – 1 February 1918) was a Finnish architect who worked in the National Romantic or Art nouveau style.

== Life and career ==
Born in Pudasjärvi and raised in Alajärvi, Thomé studied architecture at the Helsinki Polytechnic Institute, graduating in 1898. As a trainee, he worked in the offices of, among others, Lars Sonck, the firm of Grahn, Hedman & Wasastjerna, and Onni Törnqvist (later known as Onni Tarjanne). Like Sonck, he was an early proponent of the syncretic National Romantic style. After opening his first architectural practice in Tampere with August Krook, he later partnered in Helsinki with Karl Lindahl (1900–05), the Udd brothers (1909–12) and finally with his own brother Ivar (born 1882); the two of them were among the most successful architects in Finland in the early 20th century, designing numerous public buildings, business and industrial buildings and private villas. In addition, Valter Thomé collaborated with Bertel Jung and Sonck on what became an influential plan for the Töölö-Hietaniemi section of Helsinki; he later drew up city plans for Kotka, Savonlinna, Lappeenranta, Kristinestad, Naantali and Jyväskylä. In 1916, he was one of the highest-taxed individuals in Helsinki.

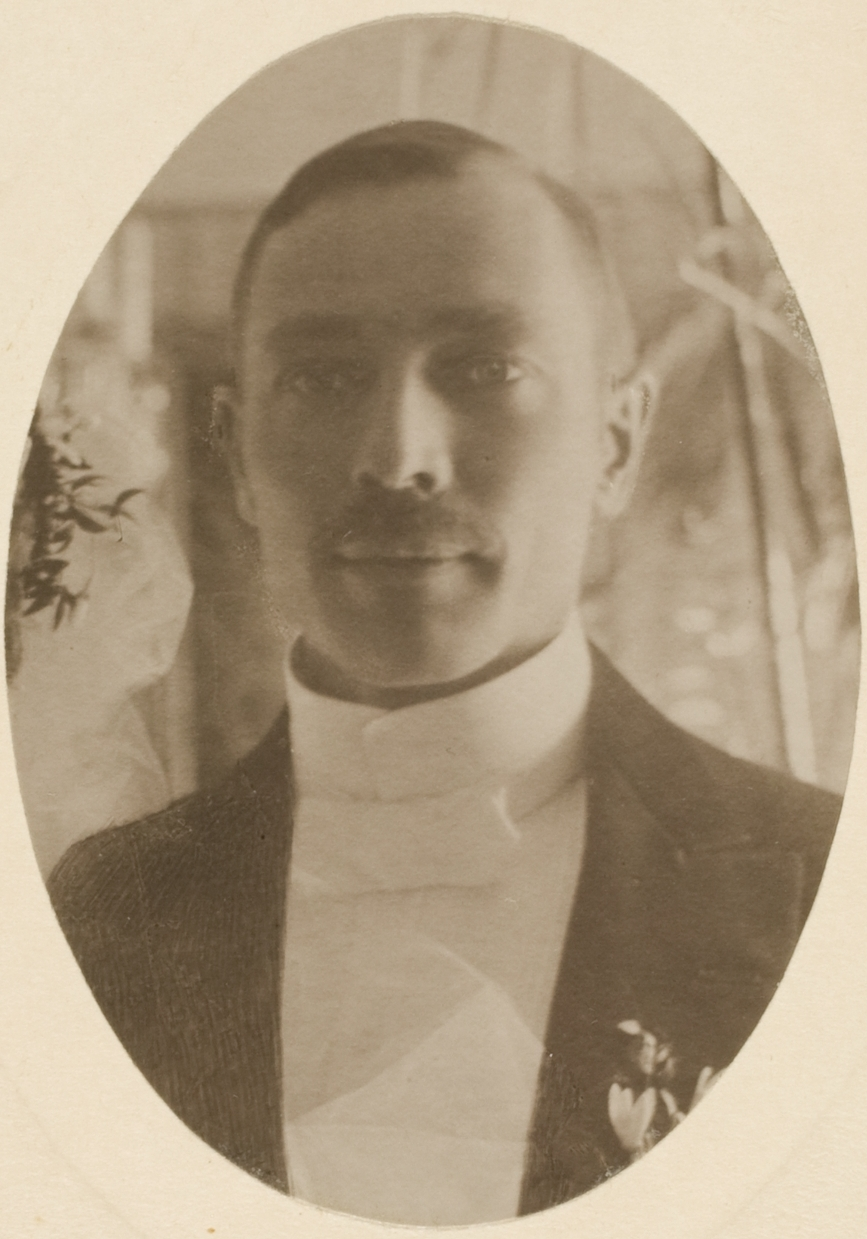
Pictured in 1905–1910

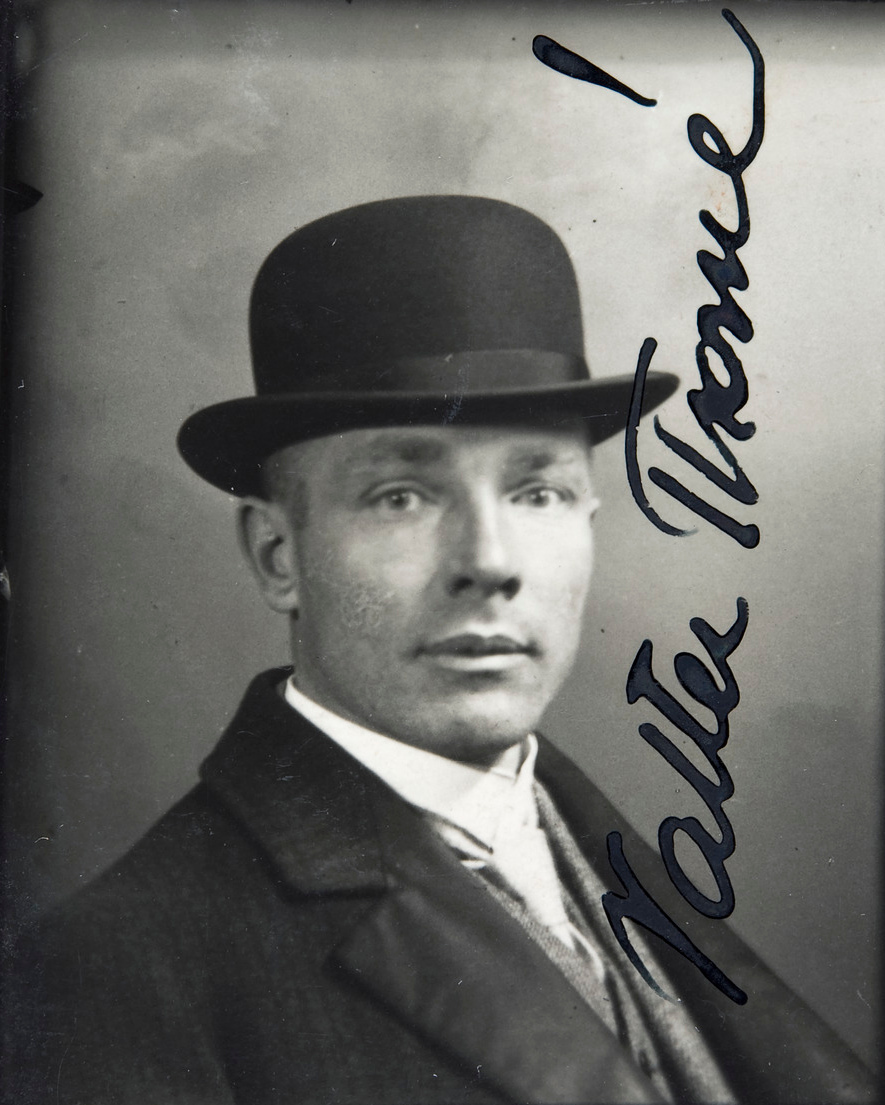
Thomé in 1914

Valter Thomé and his brother won the architecture competition for Stockmann, Helsinki centre in 1916. The building was built in 1930, and the task was then given to Sigurd Frosterus who had been on the second place in the original competition.

Valter Thomé, his brother Ivar and a third brother, William, founder of the Thomesto Oy timber company, were shot by Reds in Vihti during the Finnish Civil War while trying to cross to the White side of the line. They were buried together in the New Cemetery in Helsinki. A fourth brother, the artist Verner Thomé, was not with them and survived.

== Selected works ==
- (with Karl Lindahl) Oulu Market Hall (1901)
- Church, Perho
- (with Walter Thomé) Polytechnic Students' Union, also called the Sampo Building, Lönnrotinkatu 29, Helsinki (1903)
- (with Karl Lindahl) Headquarters of Otava publishing company, Uudenmaankatu 10, Helsinki (1905)
- Pallas Building, Kirkkokatu 8, Oulu (1907)
- Hovinsaari folk school, Kotka (1908)
- (with Udd Brothers) Flats, Annankatu 2, Helsinki (1911)
- (with Karl Lindahl) Headquarters of Suomi insurance company, Eteläesplanadi 2, Helsinki (1912), now headquarters of UPM
- (with Ivar Thomé) Varkaus town centre scheme (1913, revised 1917)
- (with Ivar Thomé), classical-style building with tile façade, Iso Roobertinkatu 25, Helsinki (1914)
- (with Ivar Thomé) Former Hotel Finlandia, Punkaharju (1914)
- Customs House, Kemi, now Kemi Gemstone Gallery
- Approximately 25 banks for Suomen Yhdyspankki (Föreningsbanken i Finland), including in Turku, Oulu, Raahe and Lappeenranta.

=== Gallery ===
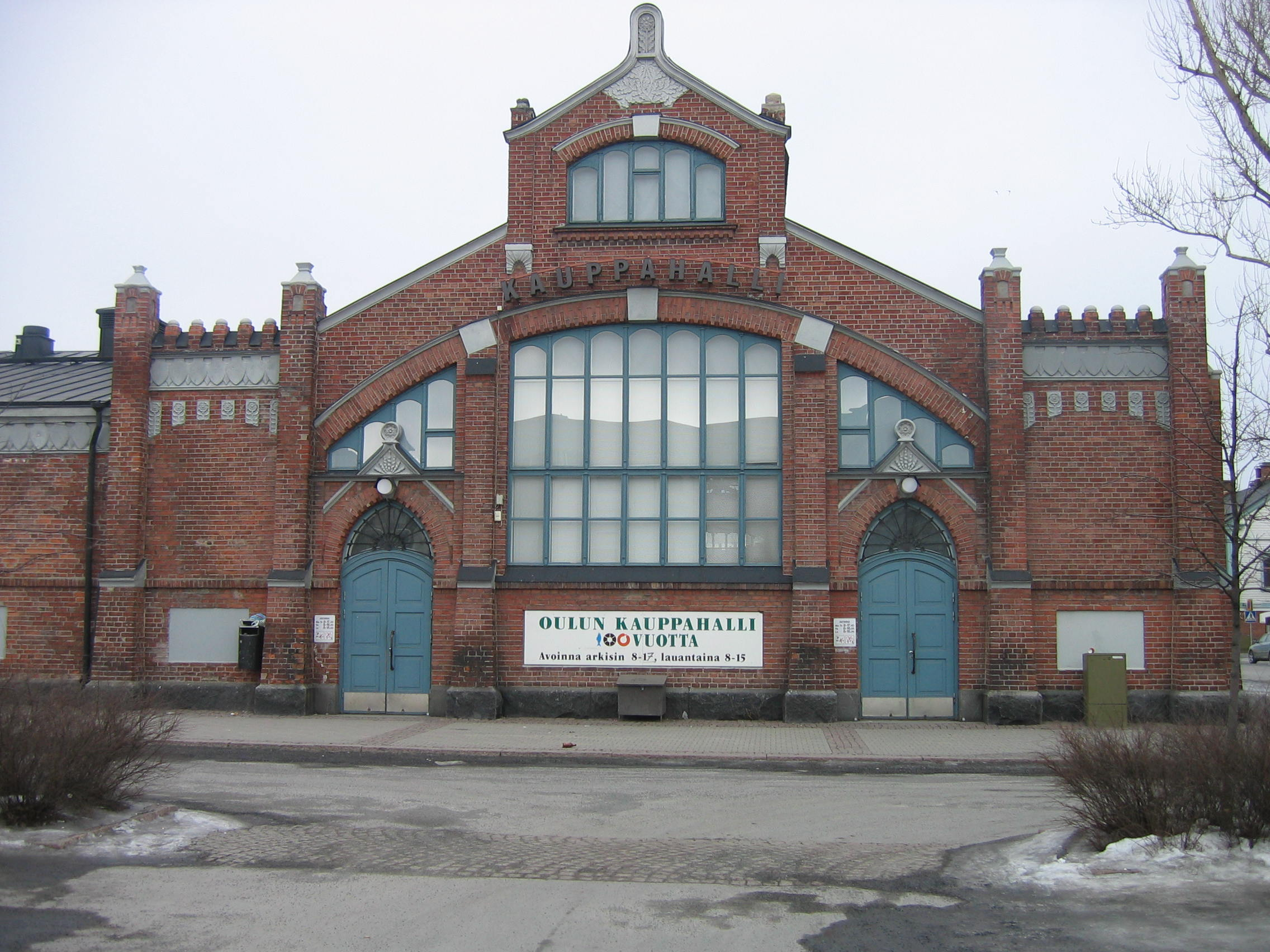
Market hall, Oulu (1901)

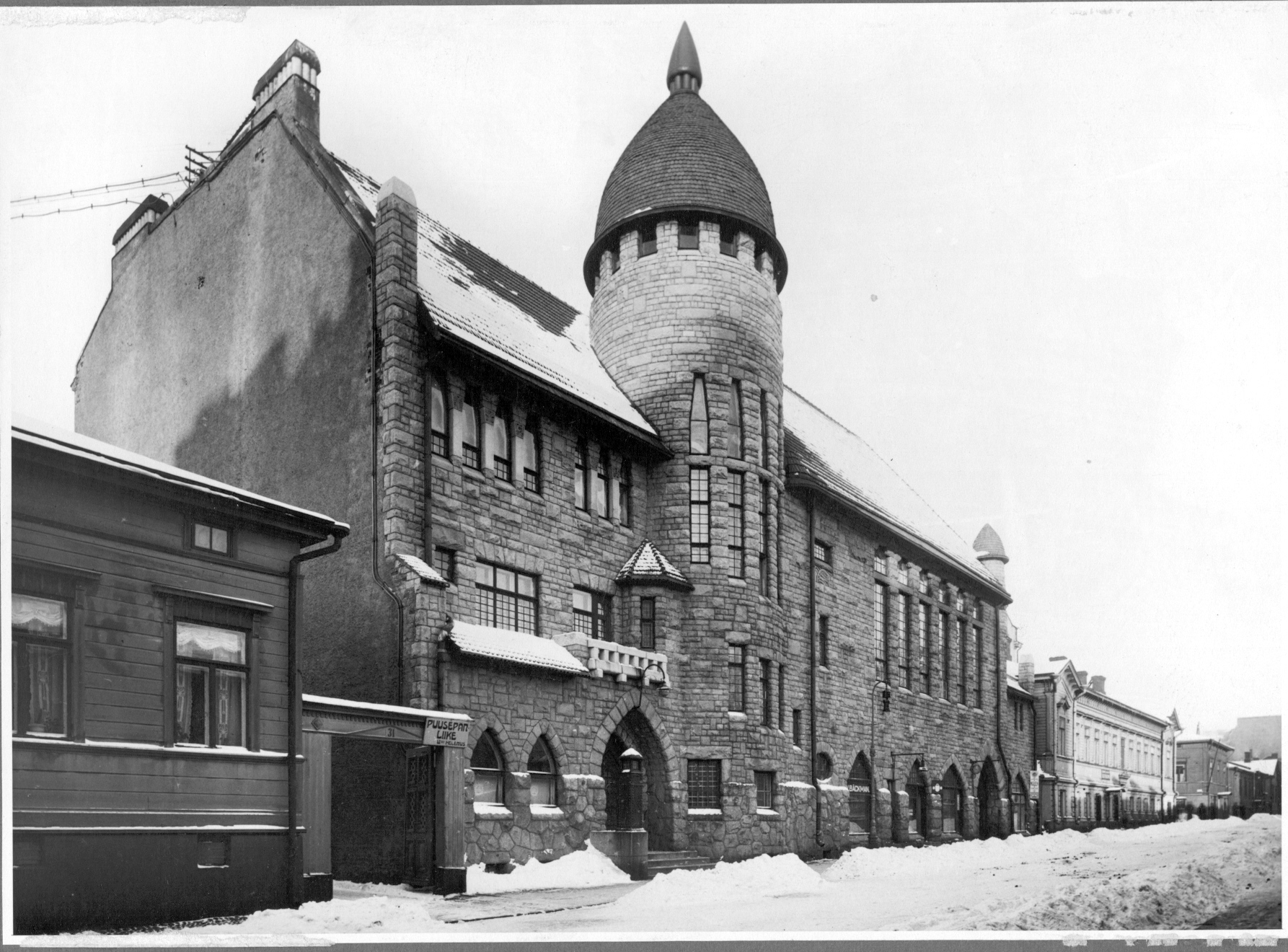
Vanha Poli, Polytechnic Students' Union building in Helsinki, 1903

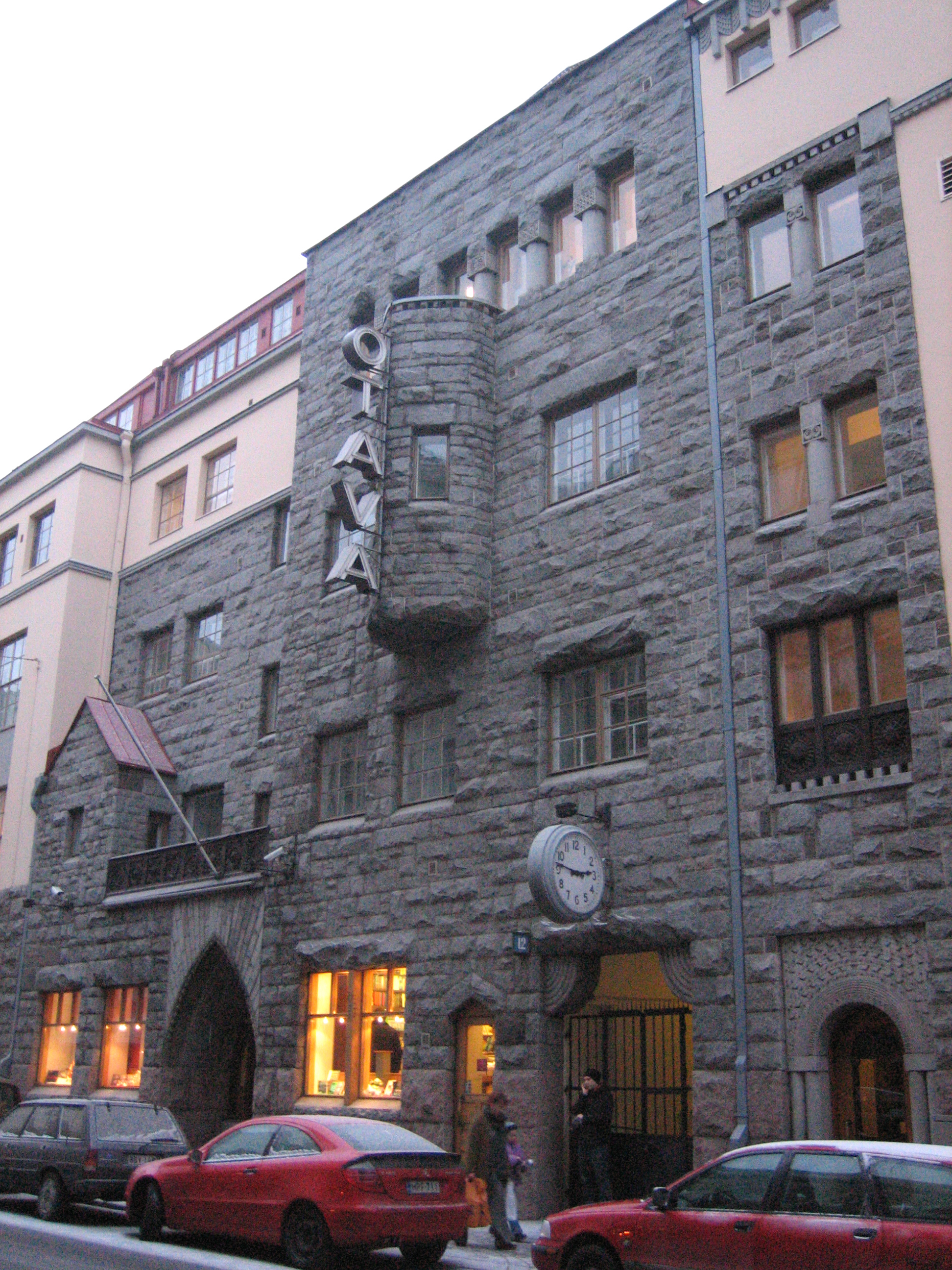
Otava publishing company headquarters, Helsinki (1905)

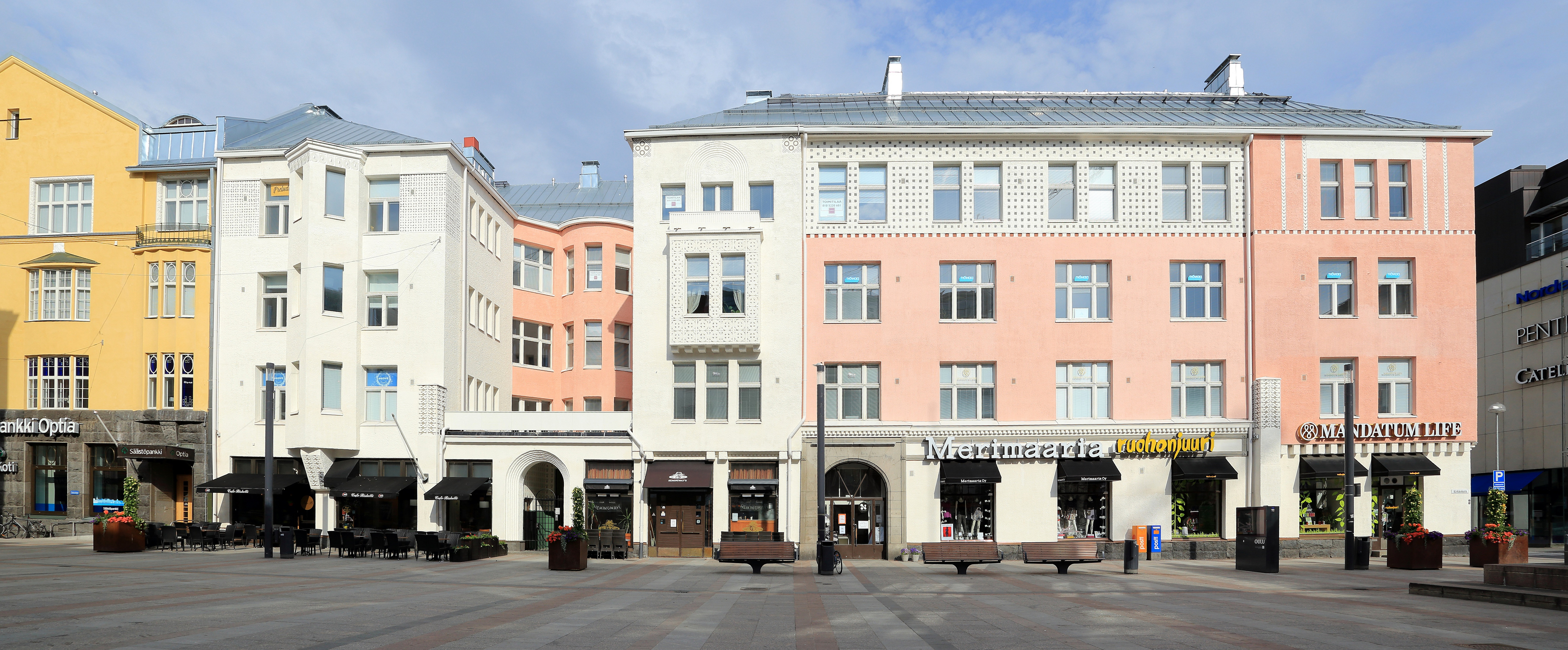
Pallas Building in Oulu (1907)

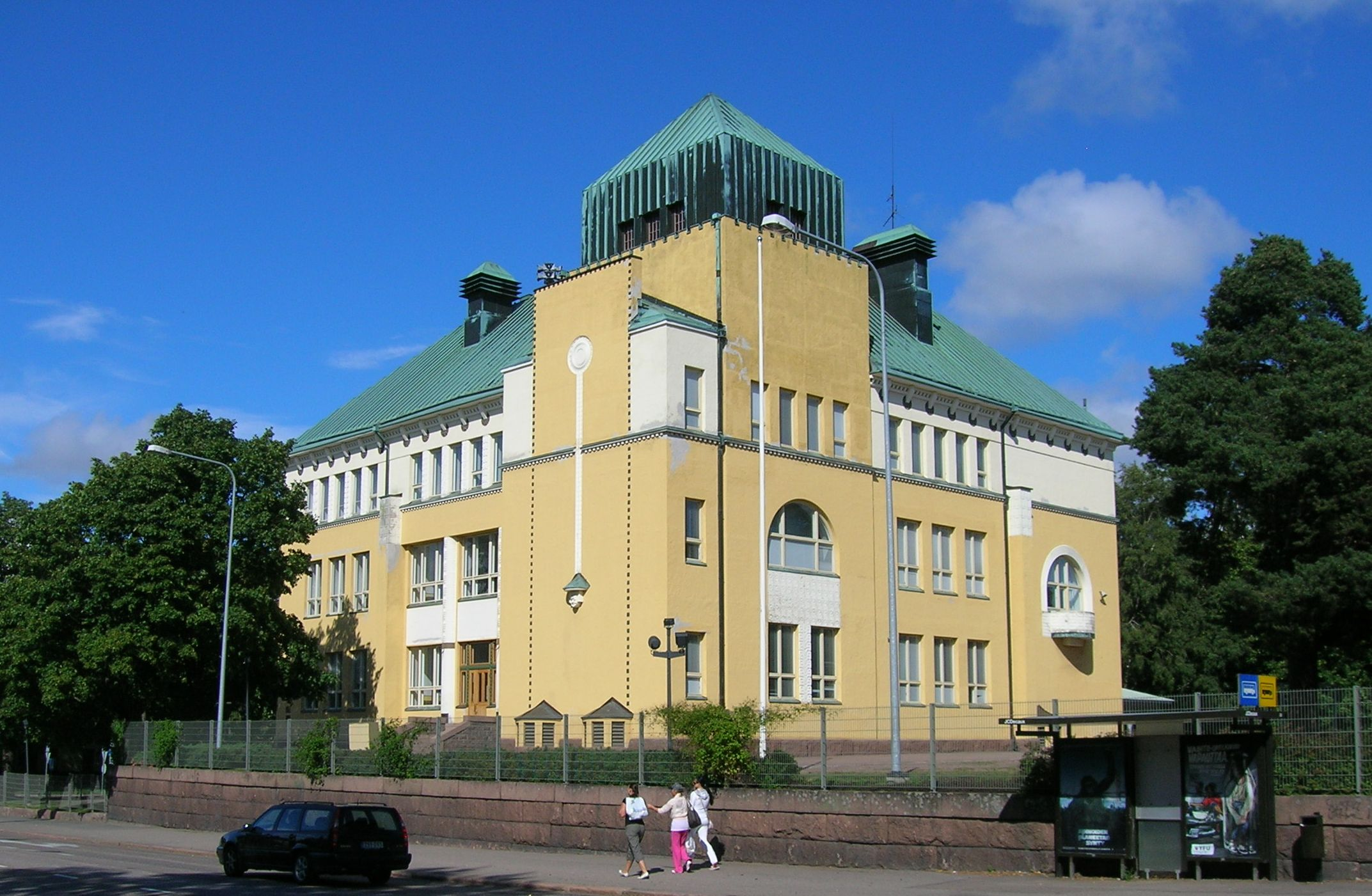
Hovinsaari school, Kotka (1908)

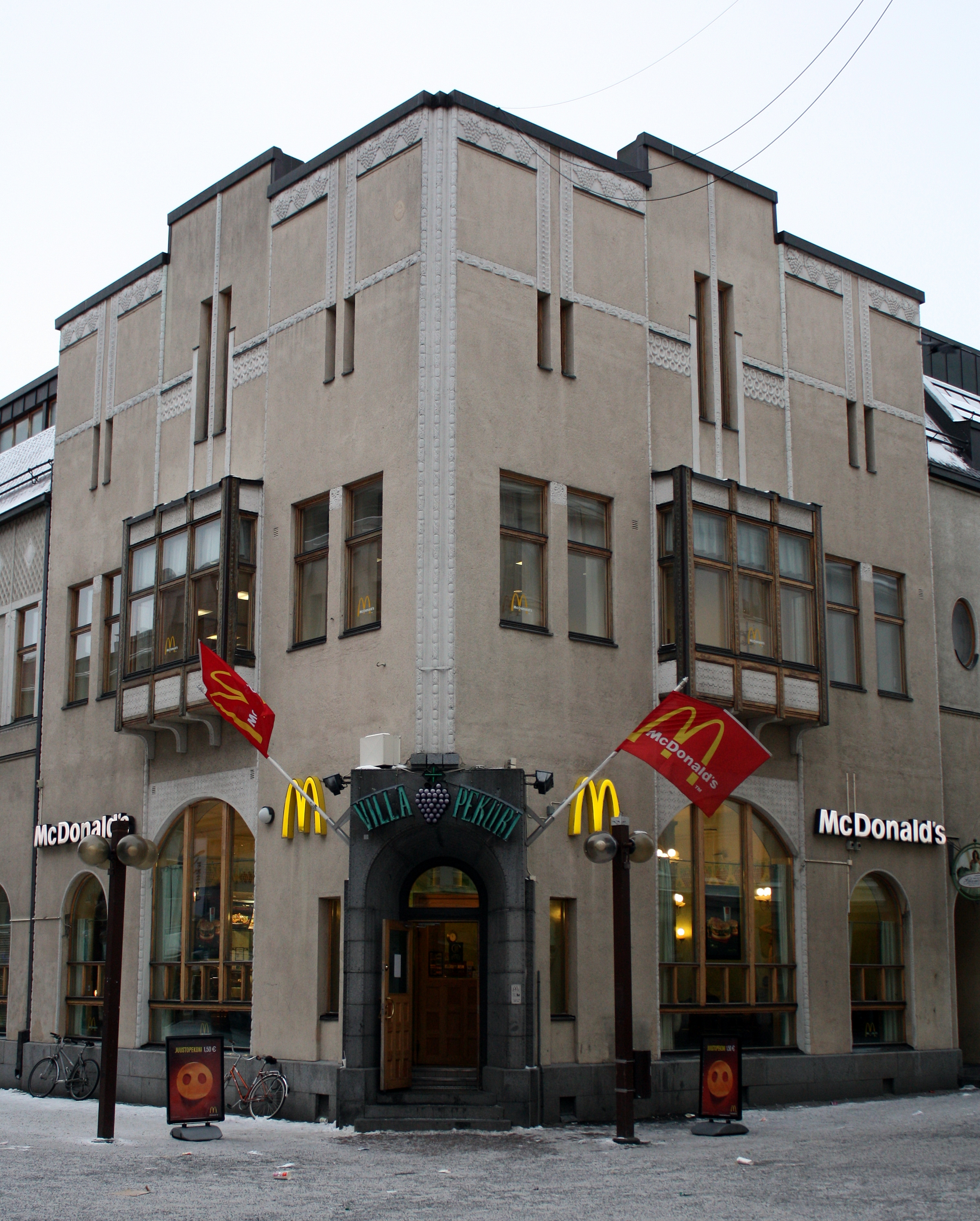
Former bank, Oulu (1910)

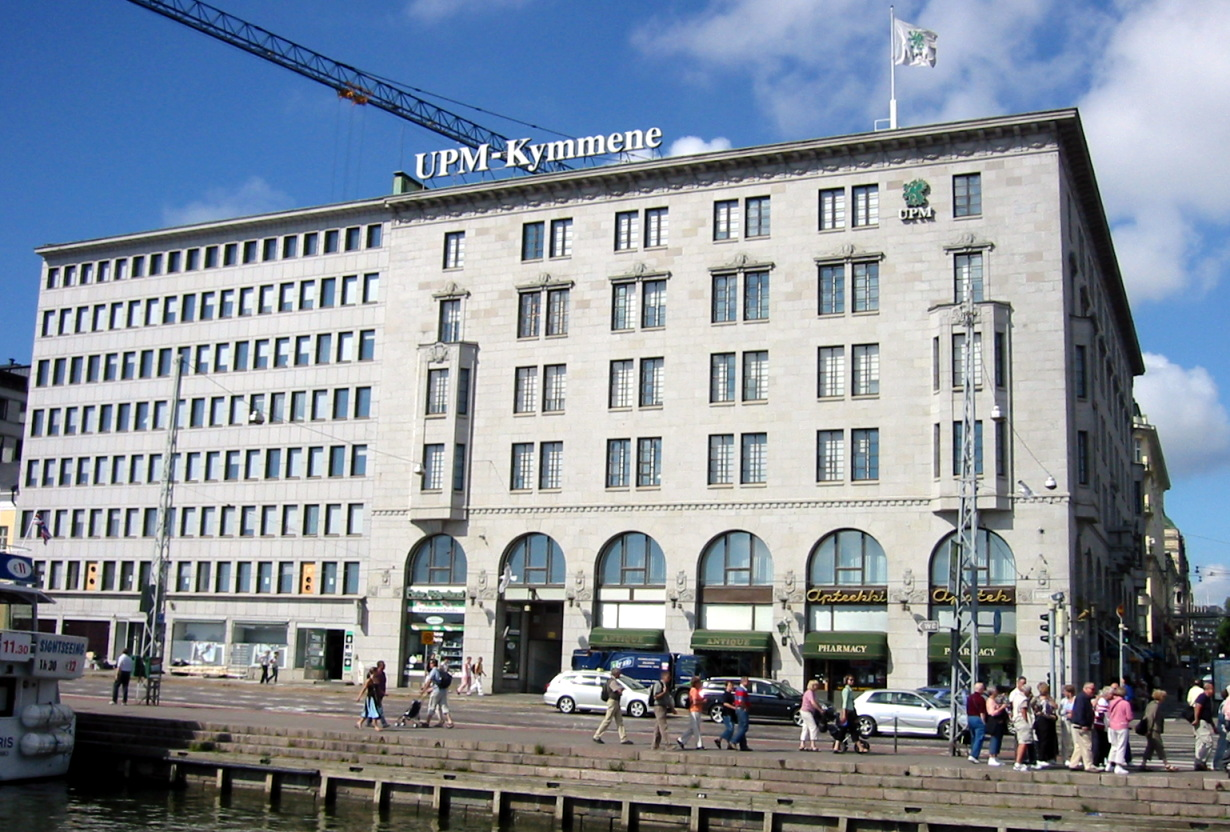
Suomi insurance company headquarters, Helsinki (1912)

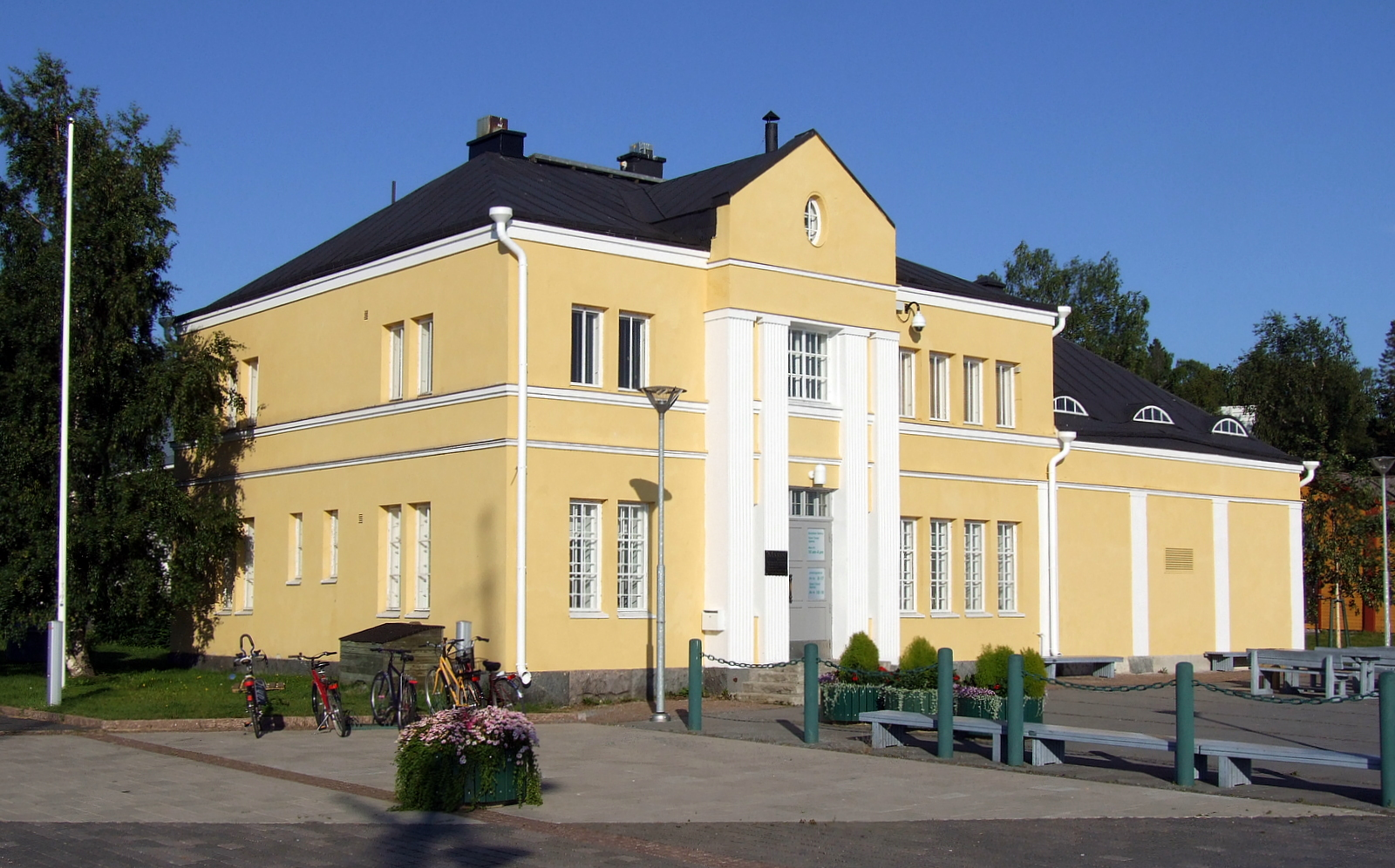
Customs House, Kemi (1912)

== See also ==
- Architecture of Finland
- Finnish art
