= Vendela (novel) =

1989 novel by Kaari Utrio

- First edition
- Author: Kaari Utrio
- Language: Finnish
- Subject: Middle Age, love
- Genre: historical fiction
- Publisher: Tammi
- Publication date: 1989
- Publication place: Finland
- Media type: Print (Hardback, pocket book)
- Pages: 433 pp
- ISBN: 951-643-307-3
- OCLC: 57873064

Vendela is a historical novel by Finnish author Kaari Utrio published in 1989. It is Utrio's seventeenth historical romance novel. It was translated into Estonian by Maire Jurima and published in 1996.
