= Vaskilintu =

1992 historical novel by Kaari Utrio

- First edition
- Author: Kaari Utrio
- Cover artist: Frederic William Burton, The Meeting on the Turret Stairs (1864)
- Language: Finnish
- Subject: Middle Age, love
- Genre: Historical fiction
- Publisher: Tammi
- Publication date: 1992
- Publication place: Finland
- Media type: Print (hardback, pocket book)
- Pages: 753 pp
- ISBN: 951-31-0051-0
- OCLC: 30475882
- LC Class: MLCM 94/13602 (P)
- Followed by: Tuulihaukka

Vaskilintu (Finnish: The Brass Bird or The Copper Bird or The Bronze Bird) is a 1992 historical novel by Finnish author Kaari Utrio. It is set in 11th century Europe. Vaskilintu and Tuulihaukka (1995) are considered to be Utrio's most important works.

Vaskilintu has been translated into German (Bronzevogel, 1998), Polish (Miedziany ptak, 1997) and Estonian (Vasklind, 1994). There exists an English translation of the book.

== Plot summary ==
A Finnish noblegirl with abilities of casting spells, Terhen of Arantila, gets mingled with royalty of Sweden, and follows in a retinue to the Court of Novgorod in Russia, where the sister of the Swedish King is to marry the Grand Duke of Novgorod (Kievan Rus). Along the journey to Novgorod an accident happens and Terhen replaces a young Swedish princess Thorgerd. The young girl has odd experiences when she meets Finno-Ugric tribe Muroma along her travel.

Years go by, and the Grand Duke of Novgorod allows a Roman (Greek) dignitary Skleros, envoy of the Emperor of Byzant, to marry the young lady. Her new Greek name is despoina Theodora Hyperborea. In Constantinople, Theodora (a rising Imperial lady-in-waiting) gives birth to two sons, Georgios to her first husband Skleros, and Juvalos ('Olaf'), with her Varangian lover Eirik Väkevä, a Swedish noble.

The widowed Theodora is sent to steward Anna Jaroslavna, daughter of the Grand Duke of Kievan Rus, throughout Europe to her future husband King Henry I of France. Theodora has strange experiences when she meets Magyar tribes along her journey. She possesses the ability to stop bleeding when necessary, and cast weather spells. In France Theodora marries a brutal Norman knight Roger of Meilhan, and settles in his small castle in Normandy. Her teenage son, Greek count Juvalos has to flee the vile stepfather.

Anna Jaroslavna, the Queen of France, assigns the widowed Theodora to steward the Anglo-Saxon royal couple, Edward the Exile and Agatha, to the court of Edward the Confessor in England. After some vicissitudes, Theodora's old love Eirik and her son Juvalos meet her in England. Terhen and Eirik finally decide to tie the knot. They move to Finland, to live in Terhen's home manor Arantila.
