= Rautalilja =

1979 novel by Kaari Utrio

- Author: Kaari Utrio
- Language: Finnish
- Genre: Historical novel
- Publisher: Tammi
- Publication date: 1979
- Publication place: Finland
- Media type: Print (Hardback, pocket book)
- Pages: 303 pp
- ISBN: 951-30-4878-0
- OCLC: 9590082

Rautalilja - romaani lemmestä ja mammonasta (Finnish: The Iron Lily - A Novel About Love and Mammon ) is a historical novel by Finnish author Kaari Utrio, published in 1979.
