= Aatelisneito, porvaristyttö =

1974 novel by Kaari Utrio

- First edition
- Author: Kaari Utrio
- Cover artist: Hannu Taina
- Language: Finnish
- Subject: 16th century, love
- Genre: Historical fiction
- Publisher: Tammi
- Publication date: 1974
- Publication place: Finland
- Media type: Print (Hardback, pocket book)

Aatelisneito, porvaristyttö (Finnish: The Noble Maiden, The Burgher's Daughter) is a historical novel by Finnish author Kaari Utrio.
