= Karl Lindahl (architect) =

Swedish-Finnish architect

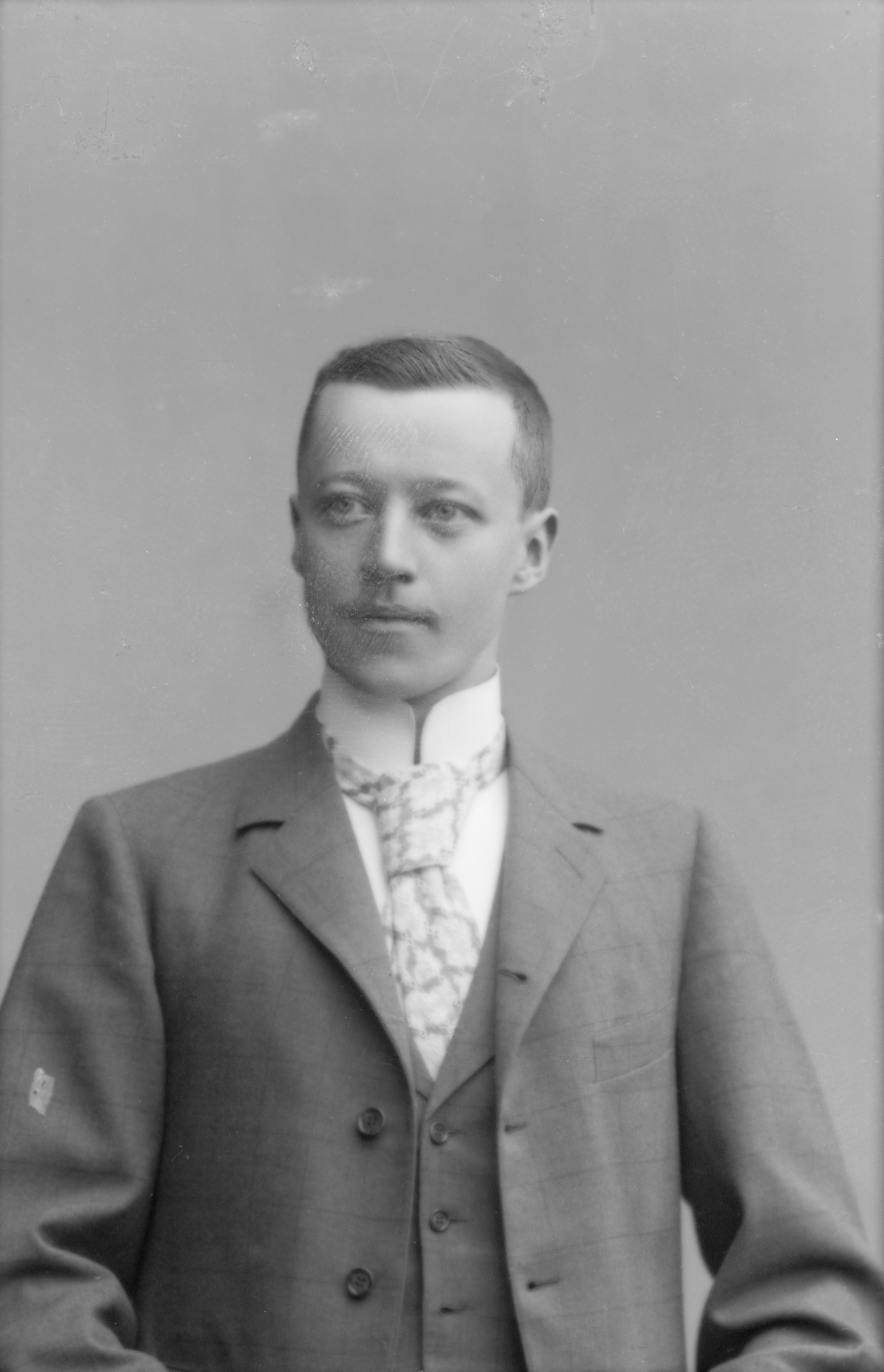
- Karl Lindahl in 1899
- Born: 10 March 1874; Jönköping, Sweden
- Died: 12 April 1930 (aged 56); Helsinki, Finland
- Citizenship: Finland; Swedish
- Occupation: Architect

Karl Håkan Einar Lindahl (10 March 1874 – 12 April 1930) was a Finnish architect of Swedish origin.

== Life and career ==
Born in Jönköping, Sweden, Lindahl studied architecture at the Helsinki Polytechnic Institute in the Grand Duchy of Finland, graduating in 1898. Beginning in 1900, he practised as an architect in Helsinki. Initially he was an early proponent of the National Romantic or Art nouveau style, for many years in partnership with Walter Thomé. Then, like many of his contemporaries, he changed to a neo-classical style. His work includes several public buildings, residences in Helsinki and some country houses in Suvisaaristo, but also many industrial buildings.

Lindahl received Finnish citizenship in 1905. In 1907, he was sent with veterinarian Oskar von Hellens on a fact-finding tour of foreign abattoirs to enable incorporation of best practices in the new Helsinki slaughterhouse.

He died in Helsinki.

== Selected works ==
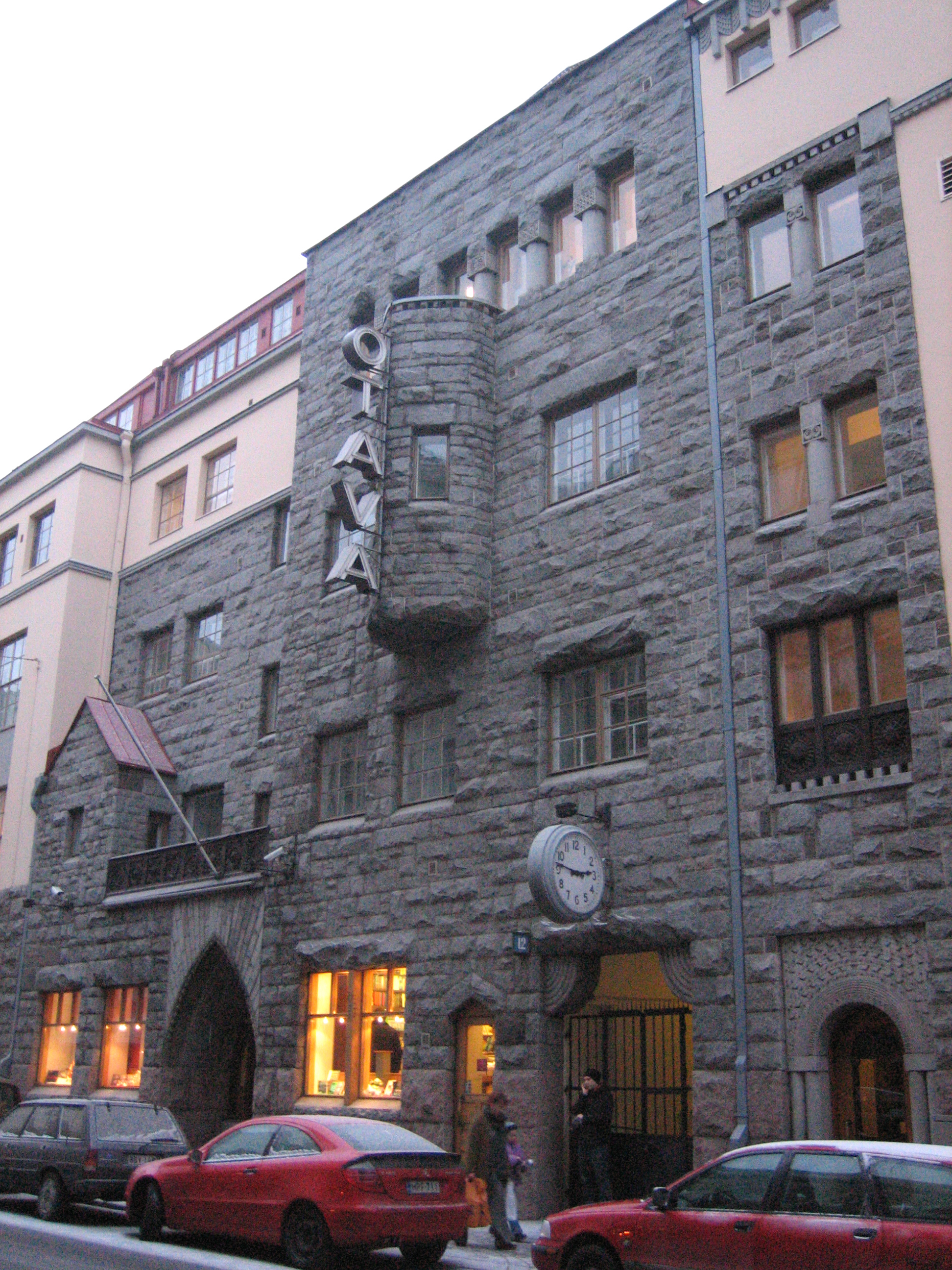
Headquarters of Otava publishing company, Helsinki, designed by Karl Lindahl and Walter Thomé in 1905

- (with Walter Thomé) Oulu Market Hall (1901)
- (with Walter Thomé) Polytechnic Students' Union, also called the Sampo Building, Lönnrotinkatu 29, Helsinki (1903)
- (with Walter Thomé) Enso Gutzeit factory headquarters, Kotka (1903)
- (with Walter Thomé) Headquarters of Otava publishing company, Uudenmaankatu 10, Helsinki (1905)
- Söderkulla mansion, Söderkulla, now part of Sipoo (1908)
- Helsinki Workers' House, Paasivuorenkatu 5 A (1908, 1924)
- Gunnarsberg villa, Grankulla (1910)
- Finnish business centre in Viipuri (1911)
- (with Walter Thomé) Headquarters of Suomi insurance company, Eteläesplanadi 2, Helsinki (1912), now headquarters of UPM
- School, Liedakkala (1915)
- Hahkiala estate at Hauho (1916)
- Sugar refinery, Salo (1919)
- Finlayson factory power plant, Forssa (1921)
- Lindö estate at Ekenäs (1923)
- Industrial and town buildings including a school, Varkaus (1924)
- Ahlström pulp mill, Karhula, now part of Kotka (1927)
- Korkeakoski power plant (1927)
Buildings designed by Karl Lindahl

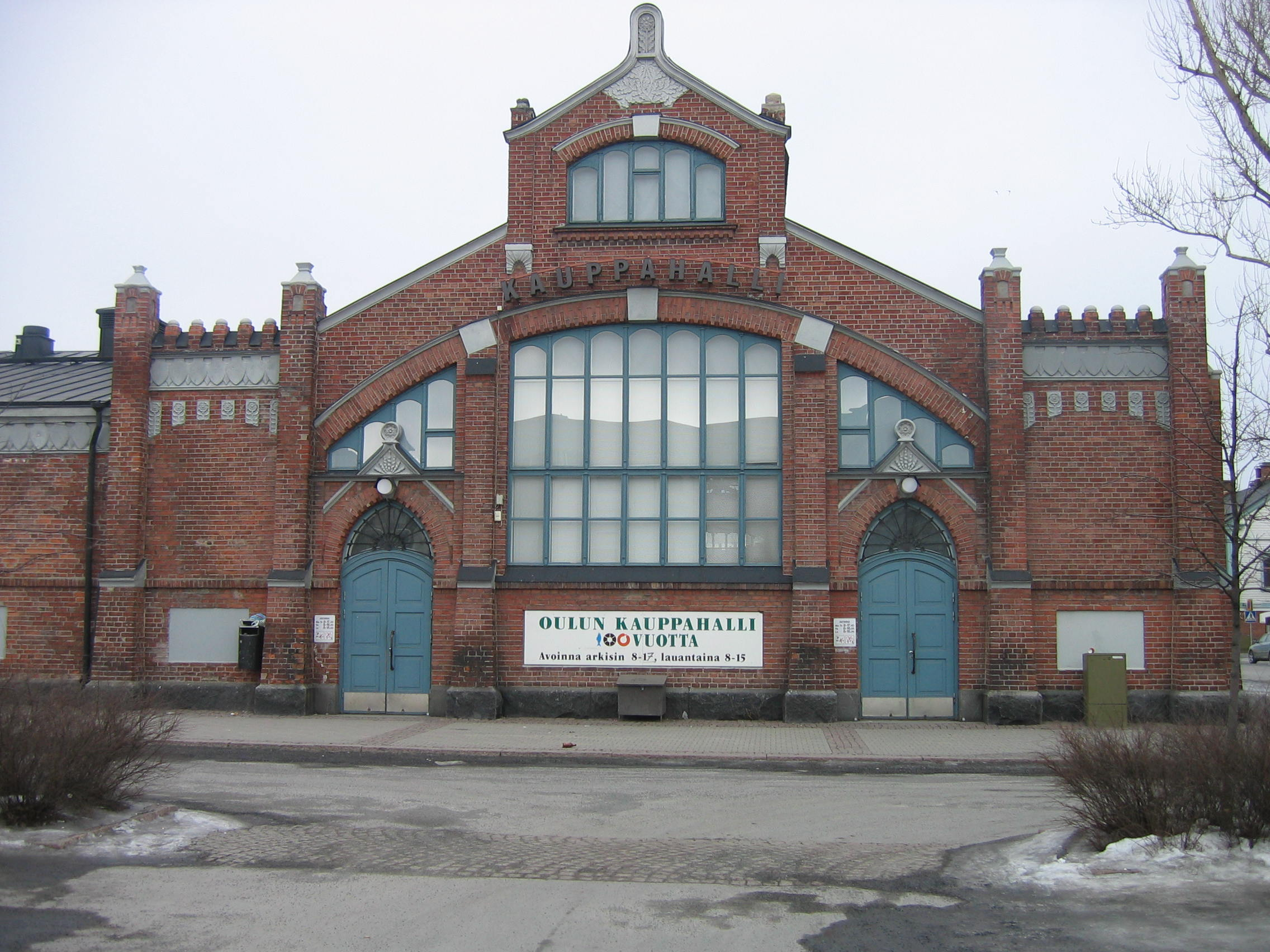
Market hall in Oulu, 1901

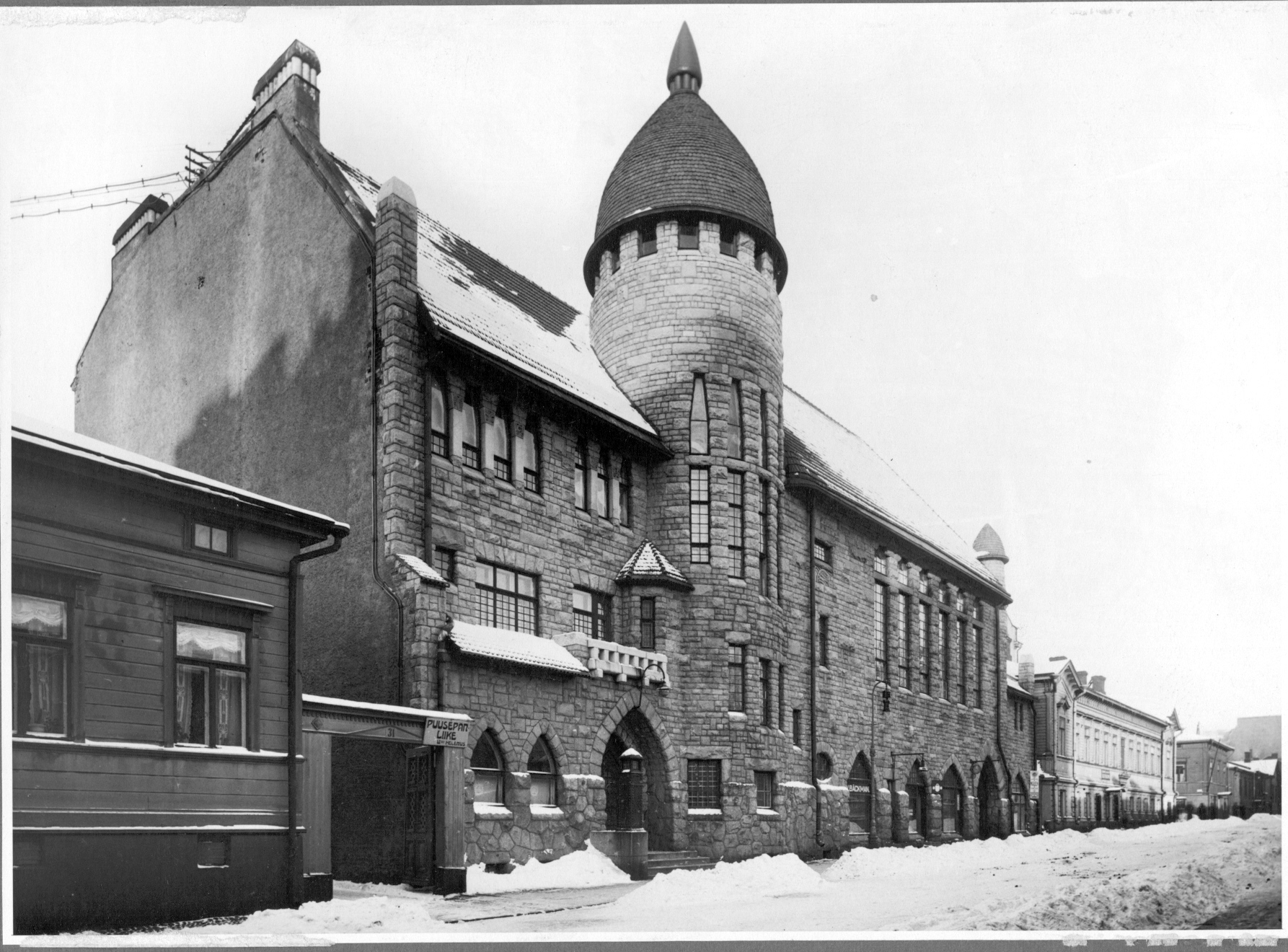
Vanha Poli, Polytechnic Students' Union building in Helsinki, 1903

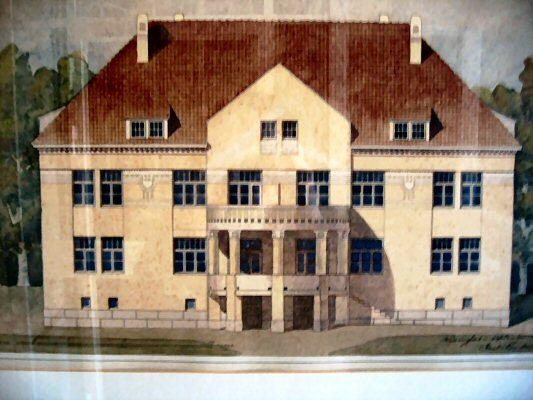
Söderkulla mansion in Sipoo, 1908

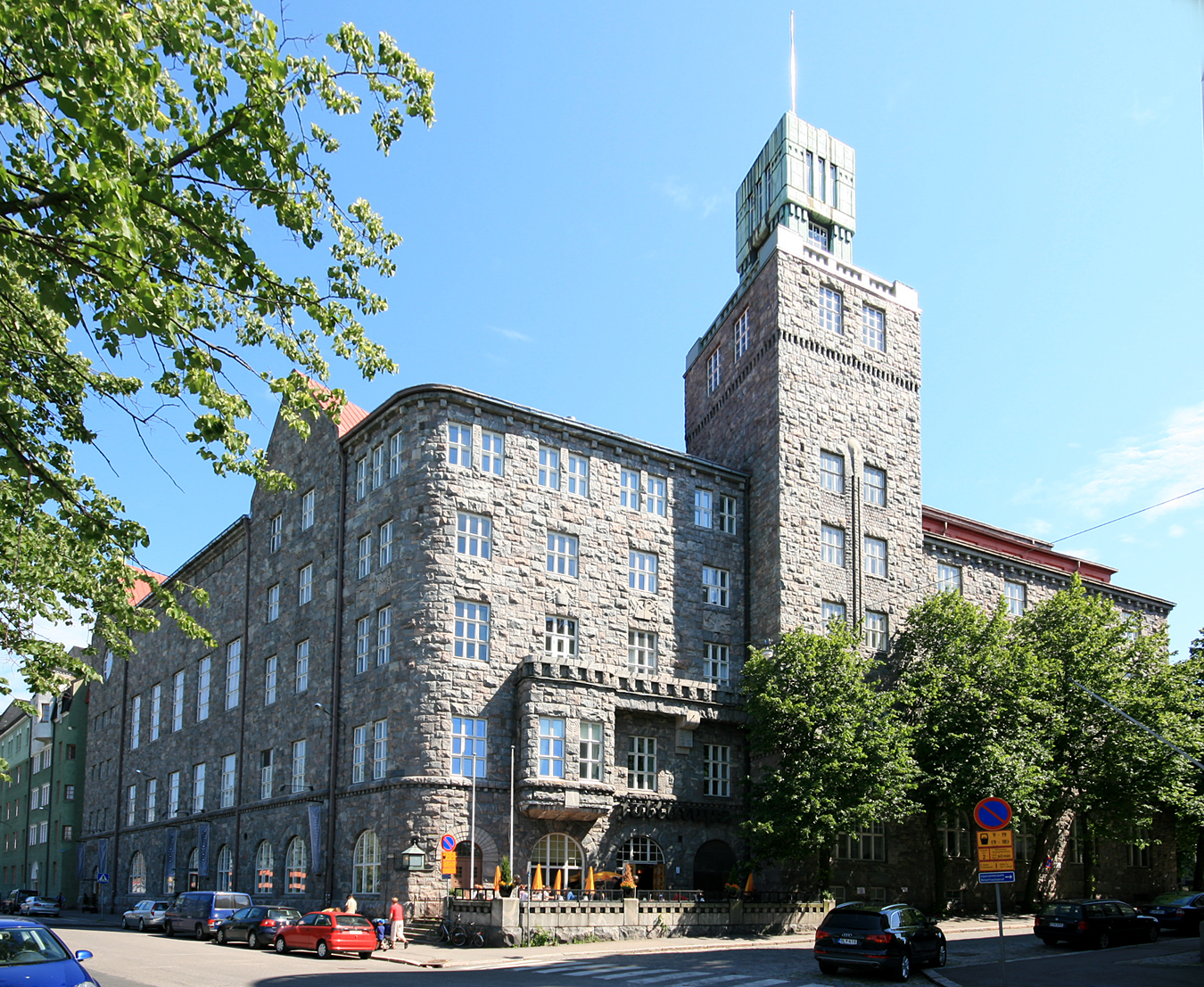
Helsinki Workers' House, 1908, rebuilt 1924

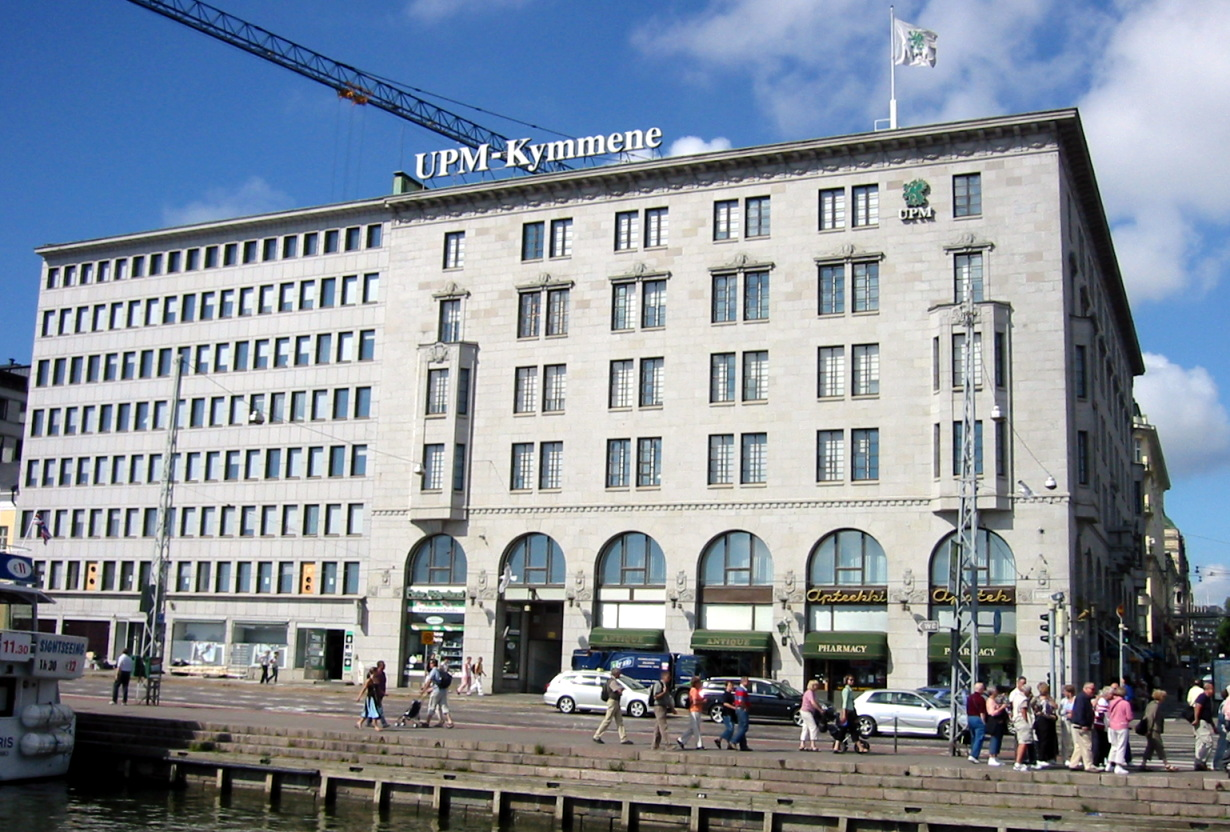
Headquarters of UPM in Helsinki, built 1912 for Suomi insurance company
