= Wendela =

Wendela is a feminine given name. It may refer to:

- Wendela Bicker
- Wendela Boreel
- Wendela de Graeff
- Wendela Hebbe, Swedish journalist
- Wendela Gustafva Sparre, Swedish artist

== See also ==
- Vendela
- Wendla
