= Polytechnic Students' Union =

Coordinates: 60°9′51.44″N 24°55′56.14″E

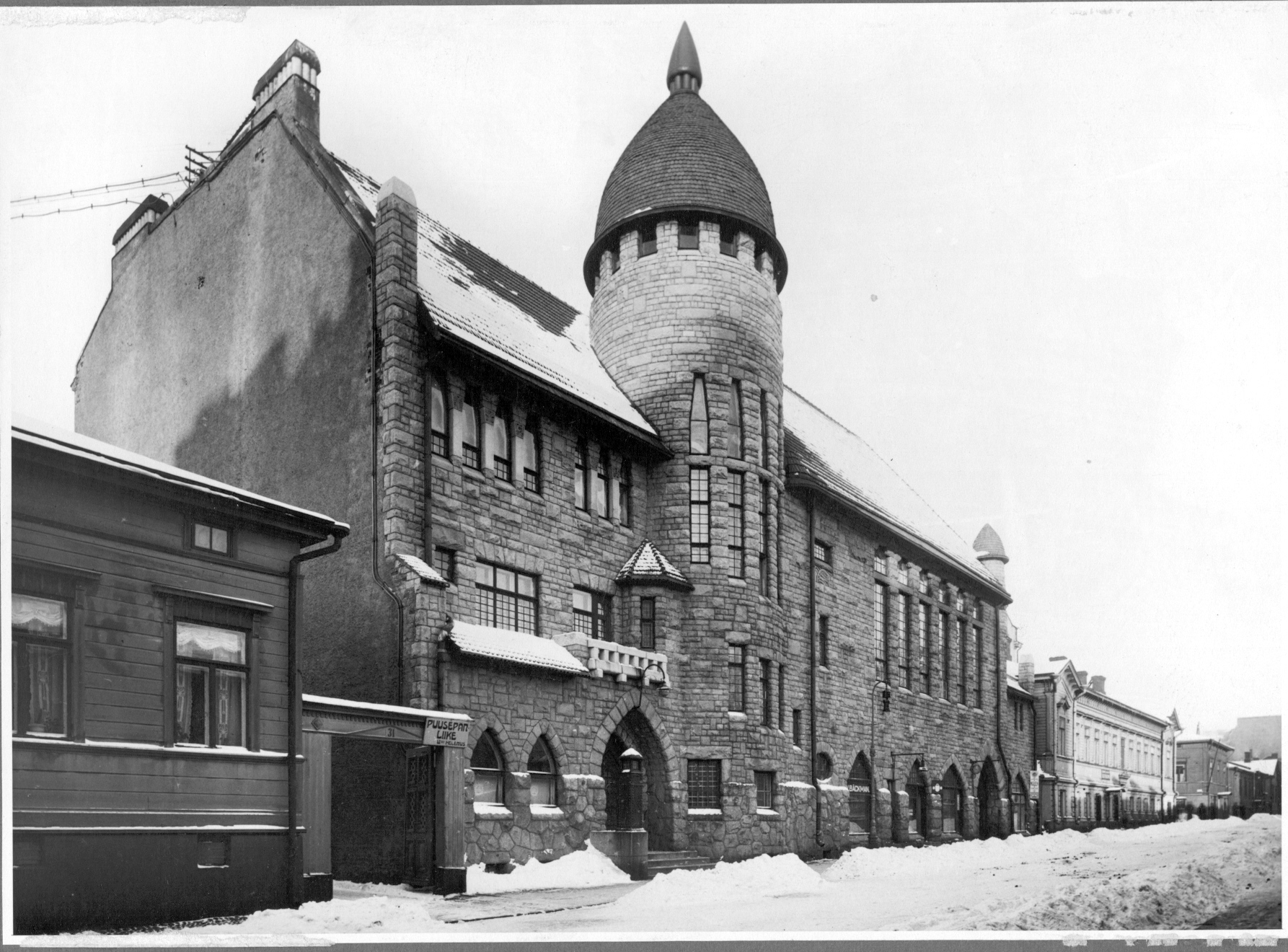
Polytechnic Students' Union soon after completion

The Polytechnic Students' Union or Sampo Building is a National Romantic building at Lönnrotinkatu 29 in central Helsinki, designed in 1903 by Karl Lindahl and Walter Thomé. It has since become a hotel and is often called the Vanha Poli (old poly).

== Building ==
In 1901, after two competitions, Lindahl and Thomé won the commission to design a student union for the Helsinki Polytechnic Institute; it was their first major commission. They named the building after the mysterious machine in Kalevala, the Sampo, and designed the whole building in National Romantic style, including the wall friezes. The exterior walls are squared rubble granite (changed from rendered stone in the original design) with a round tower, and the façade used forms derived from Karelian gables and medieval house-fronts, and originally complemented the low wooden buildings on either side. The combination of natural stone and medieval features in the design was common in National Romantic buildings at the time.

The interior was multi-functional, including fraternity rooms, a restaurant, and a meeting hall two storeys high and measuring 17.5 by 13.1 metres (57 ft × 43 ft), as well as ground-floor shops. A functional mixture of medieval and modern motifs includes log walls and heavy wood columns in the main hall, pillars built from rocks elsewhere in the building, abstract ceiling decoration and woodpecker corbels. The original furniture was designed by Count Louis Sparre.

== History ==
In the 1990s an extension with an interior courtyard was added, and the building became a hotel. It is now known as the Vanha Poli (Old Poly).
