= Suomalainen Kirjakauppa =

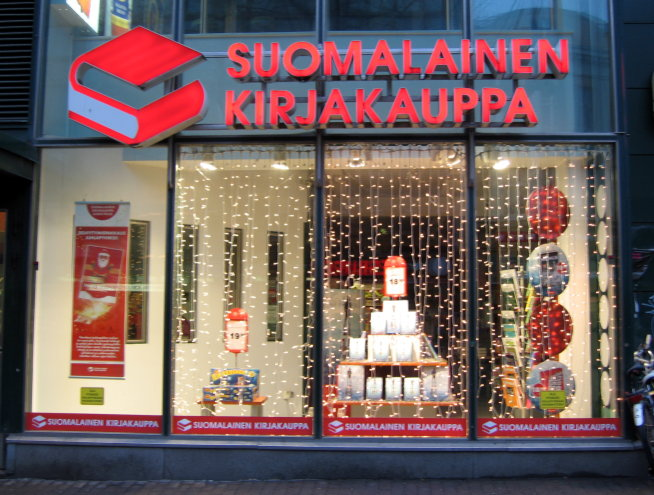
Suomalainen Kirjakauppa in Tampere

Suomalainen Kirjakauppa Oy (meaning 'Finnish bookshop') is the largest bookshop chain in Finland, with its flagship branch in Helsinki being Finland's largest bookshop. It was founded in 1912 and expanded to become Finland's largest bookshop chain in the 1990s. In May 2017 it consists of 55 shops selling books, office supplies and art materials. It is owned by Otava Group.

== See also ==
The Otava Group, Finland's third-largest multidisciplinary media company, reaches nearly every Finnish citizenby operating across three main business sectors: Books, Learning Services, and Media.
