= Sunneva Jaarlintytär =

1969 novel by Kaari Utrio

- Author: Kaari Utrio
- Language: Finnish
- Subject: Middle Age, love
- Genre: Historical fiction
- Publisher: Tammi
- Publication date: 1969
- Publication place: Finland
- Media type: Print (Hardback, pocket book)
- Pages: 330 pp
- ISBN: 978-951-30-4685-9
- OCLC: 57826902
- Followed by: Sunneva keisarin kaupungissa

Sunneva Jaarlintytär (Finnish: Sunneva, Daughter of the Jarl) is a historical novel by Finnish author Kaari Utrio. It was published in 1969.
