= Tuulihaukka =

1995 historical novel by Kaari Utrio

- First edition
- Author: Kaari Utrio
- Cover artist: Frank Dicksee, Chivalry, 1885
- Language: Finnish
- Subject: Pagan and Christian Finland, love
- Genre: Historical fiction
- Publisher: Tammi
- Publication date: 1995
- Publication place: Finland
- Media type: Print (hardback, pocket book)
- Pages: 733 pp
- ISBN: 978-951-31-3812-7
- OCLC: 141388617
- Preceded by: Vaskilintu
- Followed by: Yksisarvinen

Tuulihaukka (Finnish: The Kestrel or The Wind Falcon) is a 1995 historical novel by Finnish author Kaari Utrio. It is set in 11th century Europe. Tuulihaukka and Vaskilintu are considered to be Utrio's most important works.

Tuulihaukka has been translated into Polish (Jastrząb, 2000), German (Sturmfalke, 2002) and Estonian (Tuulepistrik, 2017).

== Plot summary ==
The story follows two young people who briefly meet in the beginning stages in southwestern Finland and towards the end, they end up to Calabria, Southern Italy. Meanwhile, they both travel separately through Europe.

The eponymous Kestrel, Juvalos Skleros Gerakis, aka Olaf Falco, owner of the ship Tuulihaukka (= kestrel, 'wind falcon'), a young man, returns from Viking treks to meet his parents at Arantila manor in southwestern Finland, and finds them slaughtered by the neighboring manor's fortune-hunter younger son and his greedy allies. After taking a revenge, Juvalos leaves with his ship, venturing to Normandy to meet his brother-in-arms and childhood friend Odo. Odo's sister Adela has grown into a beautiful woman, and is newly widowed. Olaf-Juvalos falls madly in love with her. They marry and embark to southern Italy where the Falco intends to serve Duke Robert Guiscard. Adela faithfully follows Juvalos on his travels.

Meanwhile, a young noblegirl Aure 'Nukuttaja' (Sleepmaker) of Launiala manor from southwestern Finland, abducted after left unprotected by her family, leaves with her restless brother Lyy, to seek to the Varangian guard of the Emperor of Byzant. They settle a household in Constantinople, where Aure gets fame with her natural ability to calm and soothe sick people with singing, thus the name Sleepmaker. Lyy becomes drungarios, an officer in the Imperial Army. They travel with the Great Imperial Army, including a travel to the Battle of Manzikert in Armenia. They meet Juvalos and his Norman army and retreat together the long journey back to Efesos, on the Mediterranean coast. Aure and Juvalos experience romantic encounters with each other.

Duke Robert sends the Falco to suppress a local revolt in the imaginary town of Sinetra on the Calabrian coast, promising to receive the town and territory as fief. In Sinetra, Juvalos Gerakis the Kestrel ('Falco') becomes the husband of an old Byzantine newly-widowed noblewoman despoina Helaine Harzaniteina, Countess of Sinetra, the legitimate owner of the territory, and builds up his county.

Afterwards, the Byzantine court sends Lyy ('Leo') and Aure to accompany an imperial princess Arete Dukaina to her future husband Doge of Venice. However, in southern Dalmatia (Illyria), the retinue is attacked by Norman adventurers from South Italy. Aure is taken by knight Fulbert di Montecaldo, who wants to have a highly-born Greek noblewoman as his wife. Aure has cleverly presented herself as such (despoina Aure di Bizancon), in order to survive. Aure ends up in Calabria, at the castle of Montecaldo, where she gives birth to a daughter, Constantia. The violent and greedy kinsmen and the enemies of her husband Fulbert, particularly Prince Gisulf di Salerno, cause Aure many unhappy and dangerous incidents in the following years.

Aure and Juvalos, both from southwestern Finland, now live in the same region, but it takes years before they actually meet one another. Because of a local rebellion of nobles, Aure and Juvalos end up together and they marry after Juvalos' wife Adela and Aure's husbands Fulbert and Humbert die.
