= Ursula Pohjolan-Pirhonen =

Finnish novelist

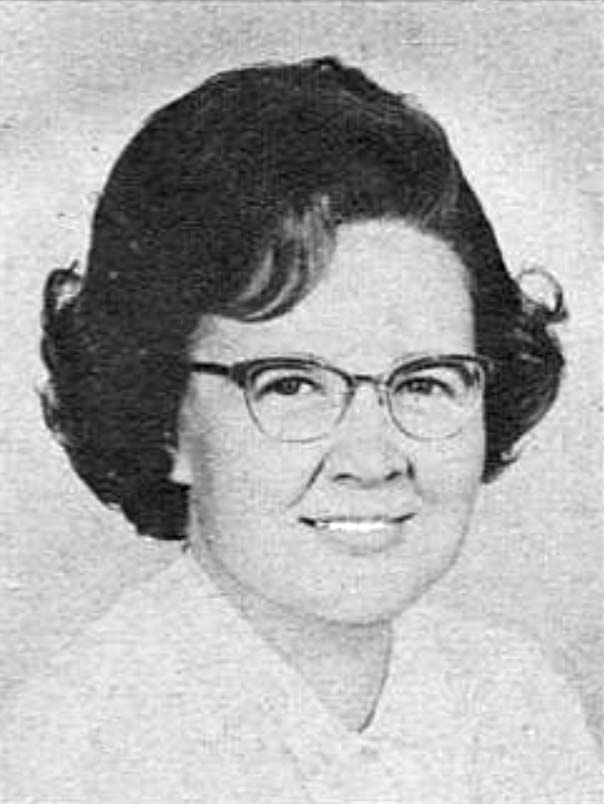
Ursula Pohjolan-Pirhonen

Ursula Kerttu Margareta Pohjolan-Pirhonen (6 April 1925 Helsinki – 17 July 1984 Sulkava) was a Finnish author of mainly romantic historical novels.

She is considered one of the founders of historical entertainment in Finnish literature, alongside of Kaari Utrio. She describes the flow of events and what happens to her protagonist in a reliable and historically accurate manner. The characters of her books let things happen to themselves, without trying to interfere or change the history.
