= Paasitorni =

Historic building in Helsinki, Finland

Coordinates: 60°10′43″N 24°56′50″E

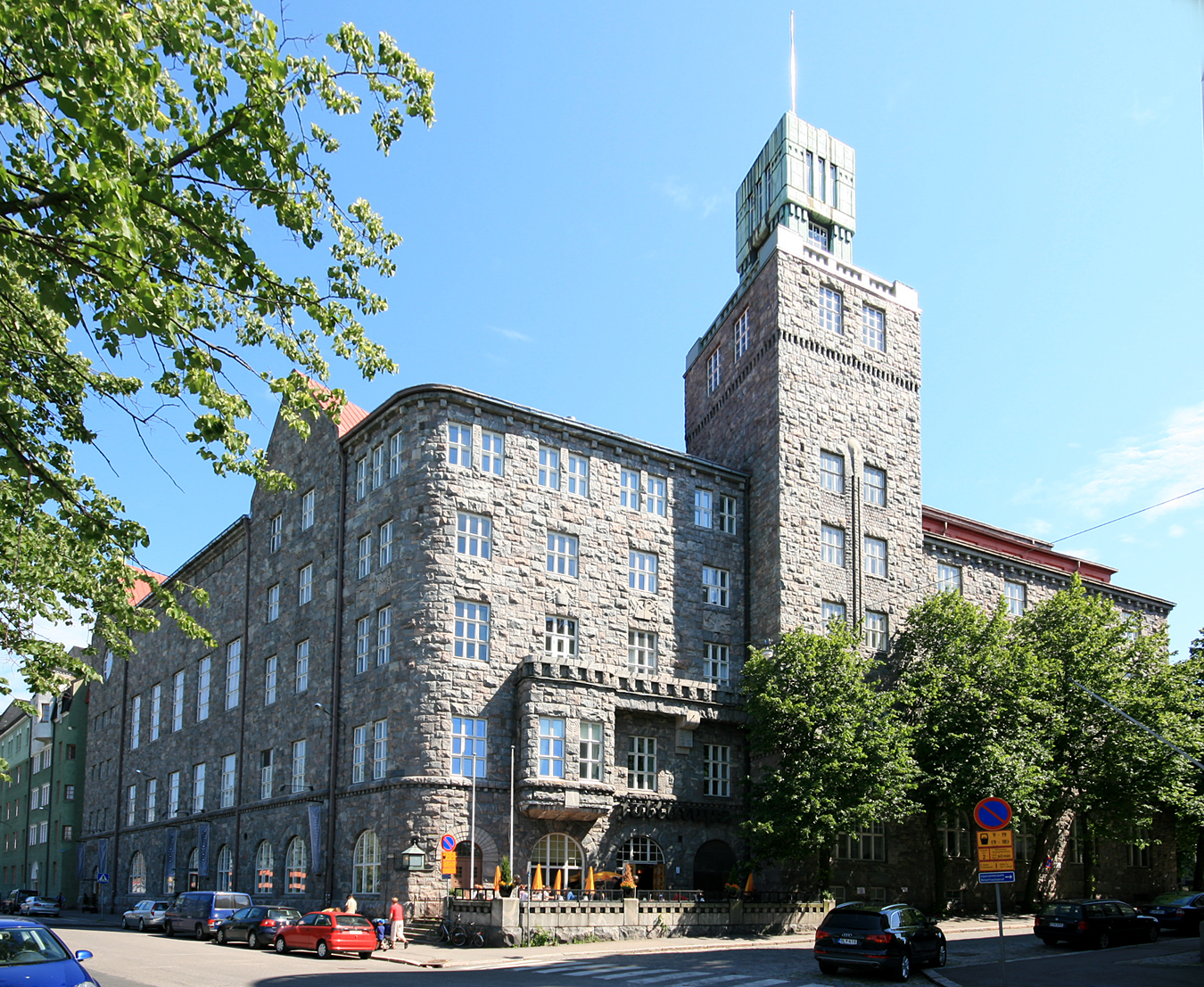

Paasitorni (Swedish: Folkets hus), also known as the Helsinki Workers' House, is a conference and congress centre of exceptional value in terms of its architecture and cultural history. The historic building is located in Hakaniemi, Helsinki, Finland. It was designed in Art Nouveau style by architect Karl Lindahl, opened in 1908 as conference and leisure premises for the working class, and for a long time, served actively as a workers' house. As a professional congress centre Paasitorni's functions have been developed since the mid-1990s. Today Paasitorni houses almost 30 spaces for meetings and events for 8–800 people, four restaurants (Paasiravintola, Paasin Kellari, Juttutupa and Graniittilinna) and hotel Scandic Paasi with 170 hotel rooms. A floating restaurant pavilion, Meripaviljonki, seating 200 was also opened in 2015 in front of Paasitorni, by the Eläintarhanlahti bay.

== History ==
The imposing facade of castle-like Paasitorni is built in stone carved out of the bedrock where the building now stands, some of which was set aside at the farsighted suggestion of the original workmen and used in the extension completed in 1925. The granite facade with its high tower made it an eye-catching public building visible for miles. Sufficient granite was quarried to also build a wall encircling the outside space and pave the neighbouring street running down to the shoreline.

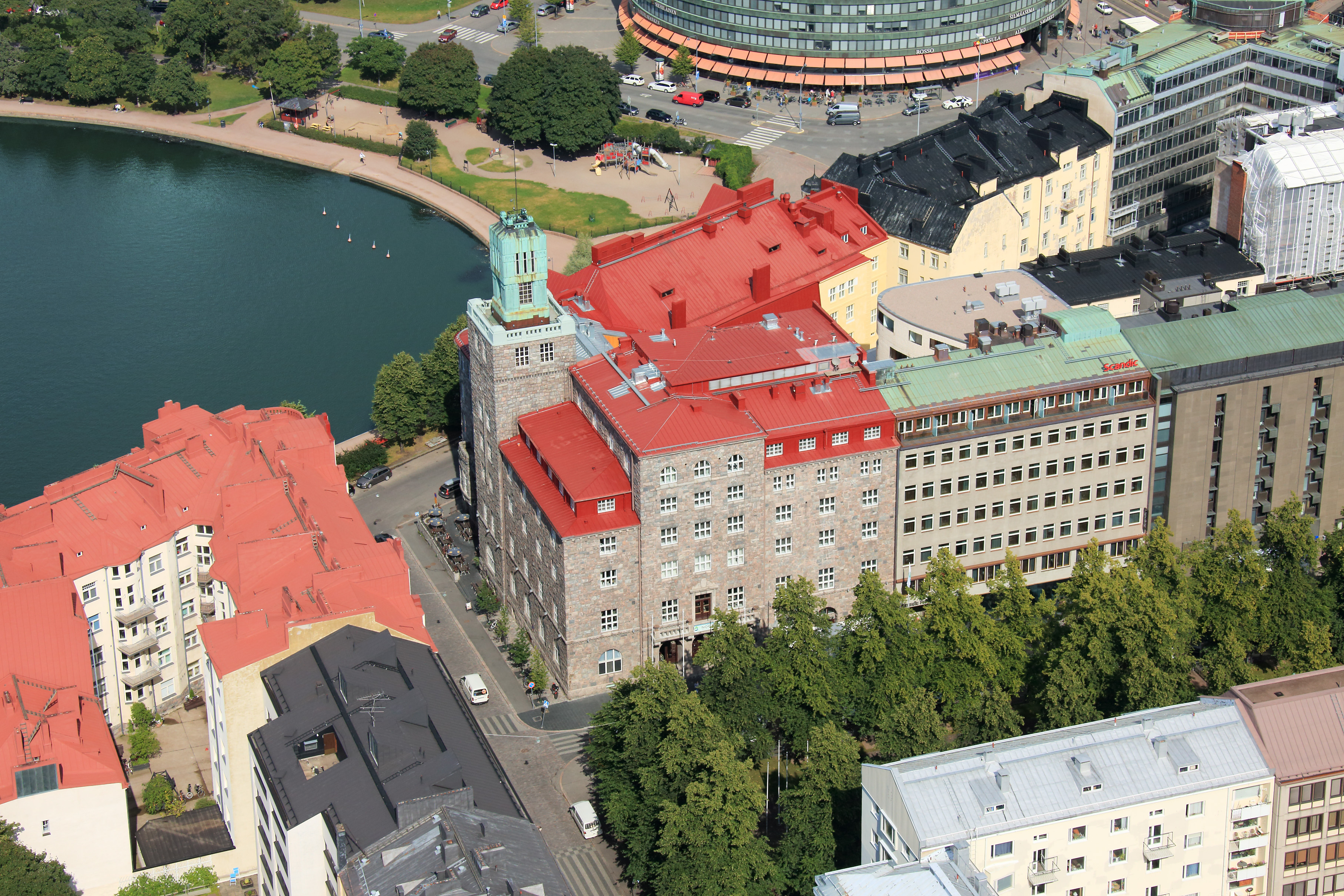
Entrance, Paasitorni and Scandic Paasi.

The oldest part of the Paasitorni building, completed in 1908, is late Art Nouveau in style. The building's facade, main staircase and the Congress Hall are expertly decorated with images of tools and symbols depicting various occupations to highlight the skill of the craftsman. In the 1918 Finnish Civil War, the Reds made the building their headquarters. The Germans who had come to the aid of the Whites fired on the Workers' House heavily during the Battle of Helsinki. The tower and the Congress Hall were severely damaged and had to be rebuilt after the war. The Congress Hall's Art Nouveau chandeliers dating back to 1919 were designed by Karl Lindahl.

In 1925 the Worker's House gained a new granite-clad extension also designed by architect Karl Lindahl. The new extension incorporated the building's current main entrance, the vestibule and the second floor restaurant. In terms of style, this section with its solid black pillars epitomises 1920s Nordic Classicism.

In the mid-1990s it was decided to commence restoring Paasitorni's premises in keeping with the architect's original plans. The premises were skilfully restored between 1996 and 2007. In 2010 Paasitorni was presented as a candidate Unesco World Heritage Site together with eight other important buildings in the labour movement. Paasitorni was found perfectly to meet Unesco's criteria for a World Heritage Site in terms of authenticity and historical integrity. The main aim of the renovation work and new building work has been to retain the spirit of each of Paasitorni's historic periods.
