= This is Finland =

Children's book by Aino Havukainen and Sami Toivonen

- Author: Aino Havukainen; Sami Toivonen
- Original title: Tatun ja Patun Suomi
- Translator: Owen F. Witesman
- Illustrator: Aino Havukainen; Sami Toivonen
- Language: Finnish
- Series: Tatu ja Patu
- Genre: Children's literature
- Publisher: Otava
- Publication date: 2007
- Publication place: Finland
- Media type: Print
- Pages: 48
- Awards: Finlandia Junior
- ISBN: 978-951-1-21915-6
- OCLC: 4112442

This is Finland is an illustrated children's book by Finnish authors Aino Havukainen and Sami Toivonen, translated into English by Owen F. Witesman. It introduces young children to the history, culture and geography of Finland. It was first published in 2007 by the Finnish publishing house Otava under the original title "Tatun ja Patun Suomi" (Swedish name: "Det här är Finland") and has won the Finnish Finlandia Junior book price for the same year.

It is part of a collection (the Tatu ja Patu collection) of six illustrated books for children describing everyday life.
