= Vehkalahti =

Former municipality of Finland

Coordinates: 60°34′32″N 027°08′38″E

Vehkalahti (Swedish: Veckelax) is a former municipality surrounding the town of Hamina in south-eastern Finland. At the beginning of 2003 Hamina and Vehkalahti combined to form a new town of Hamina.

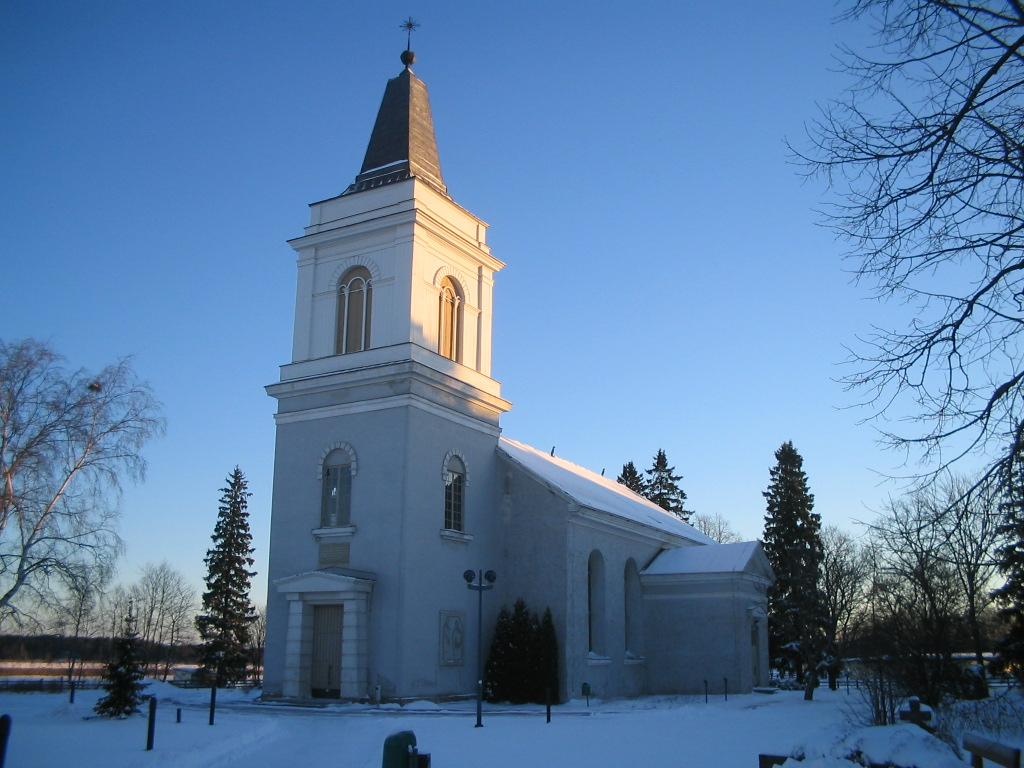
St. Mary's Church, formerly known as the Vehkalahti Church.

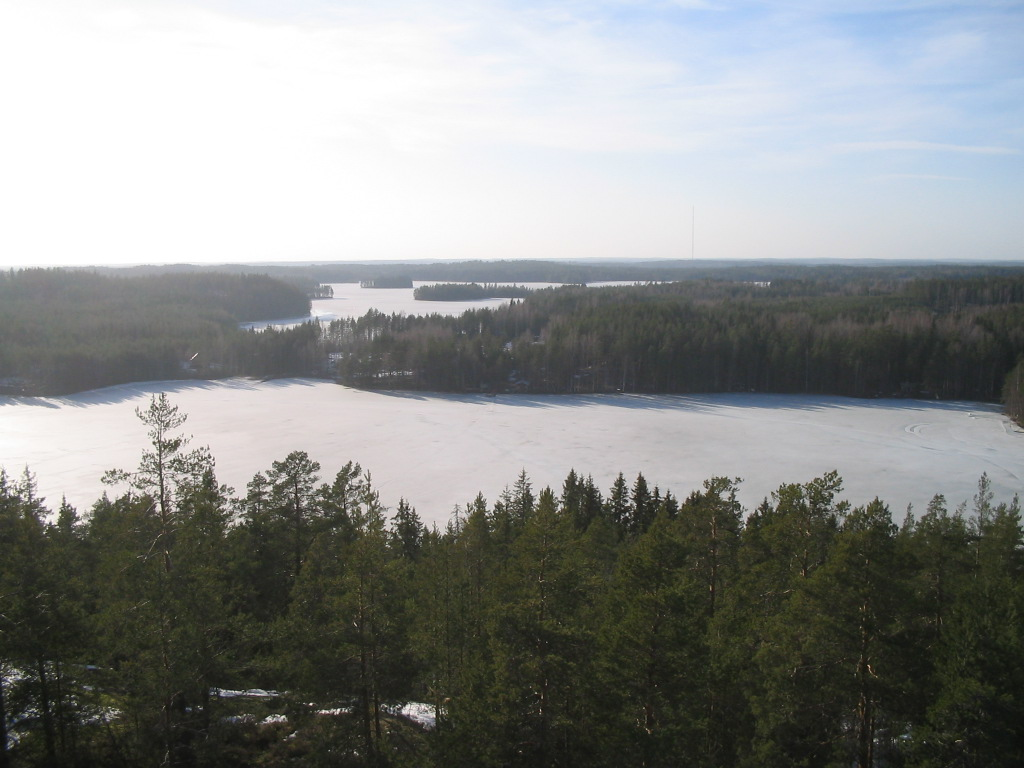
A view from Siliävuori, a hill in Kannusjärvi.

== History ==
These southern parts of Karelia are known to be the oldest parts of modern Finland with settlements. The first markings of Vehkalahti as a continuous settlement or village date back to 1336, when it became a major place for east/west trading. The plans to build a town grew slowly as the place became crowded. In 1653 the area surrounding the village church officially became a town, which was called Vehkalahden Uusikaupunki (Swedish: Veckelax Nystad, English: Newtown of Vehkalahti).

== Surroundings ==
While the area in the immediate vicinity of the church building became a town, the surrounding land remained countryside. Formerly the area of Vehkalahti was much larger, almost the entire Kymenlaakso. Still, later many areas became new municipalities. The largest population centers are Husula, Salmenkylä, Uusi-Summa, Poitsila and Neuvottoma, there are also many rural villages like Metsäkylä, Reitkalli, Kannusjärvi and Pyhältö.

== Peculiar Nobility ==
In literature, Vehkalahti is particularly renowned for its peculiar medieval petty nobility, knaappiaateli (families Husgafvel, Pilhjerta and Brandstaka), which also acted as a link between Vehkalahti and the Vyborg Castle. Built by Swedes, about 100 kilometres (60 mi) east of Vehkalahti, it became a place of great military importance for European east/west foreign communication. Today it is located on Russian territory.

== Vehkalahti church ==
The Vehkalahti church (now known as St. Mary's church, or Marian kirkko in Finnish) was built in the 14th century at the place where the town of Hamina is now.

== See also ==
- Poitz
- Vehkalahden neidot

== Bibliography ==
- Sjöström, M (January 2011). Medieval landed inheritances of the Junkar and Vilken lineages of Vehkalahti, Finland. Vol. 3. pp. 425–461.
- Sjöström, M (July 2011). Y-DNA and records of medieval land inheritance in Rolandh and Tepponen lineages of Vehkalahti, Finland. Vol. 3. pp. 527–563.
