= Kai Linnilä =

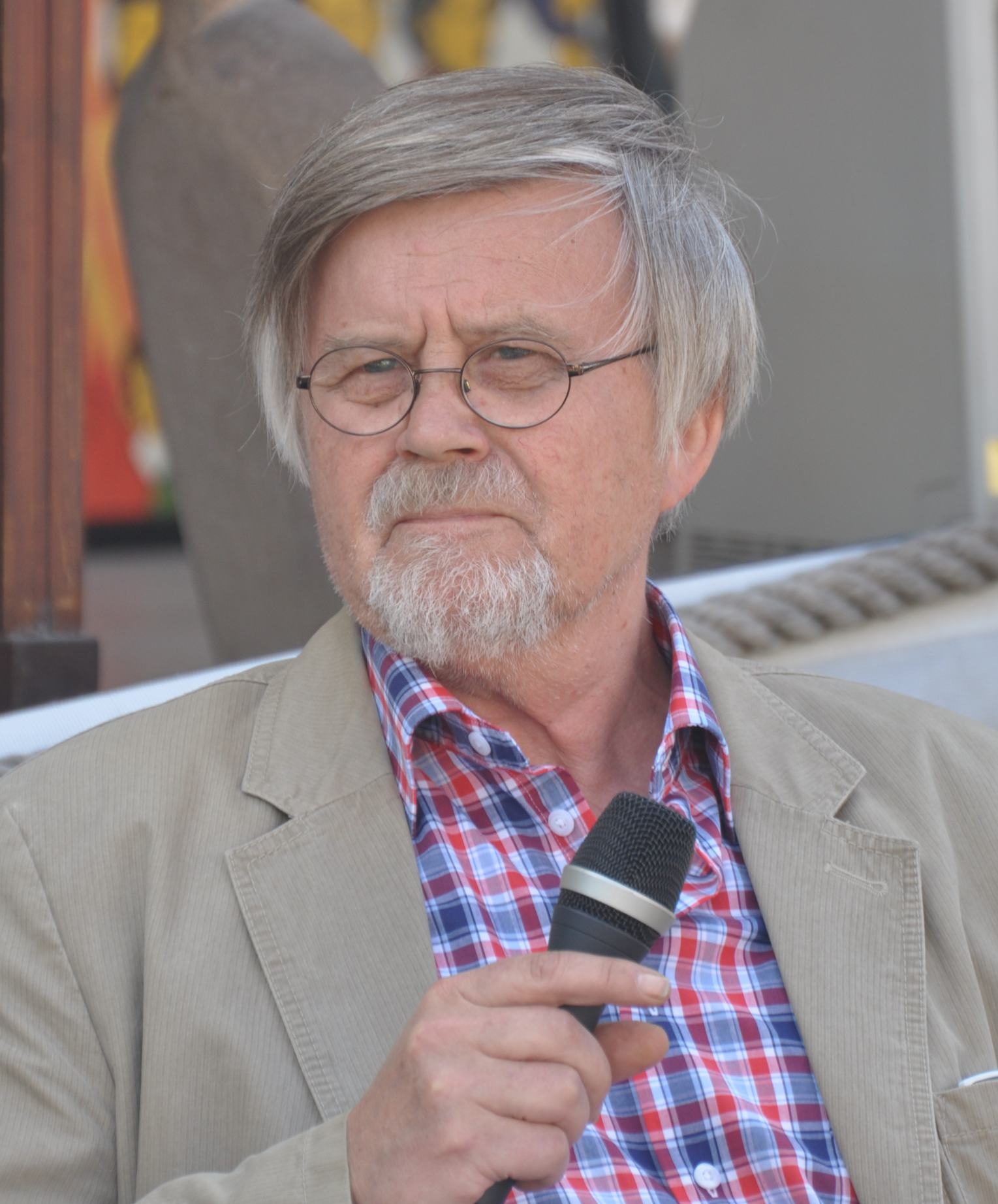
Kai Linnilä in 2012.

Kai Linnilä (1942 - 24 August 2017) was a Finnish editor and the writer of many non-fiction books as well as the husband of the novelist Kaari Utrio. He was also responsible for the importation and marketing of cigars and pipes in the Oy Amanita Ltd, owned by the Utrios family.

== Works ==
- Isoäidin kermakakku (The Grandmother's Cream Cake)
- Oman äidin lihapullat (The Own Mother's Meat Balls)
- Punainen tupa ja erämaa. Rikkaan arjen allakka (The Red Cottage and the Wilds. The Almanac of Rich Everyday Life; with Seppo Saraspää)
- Wanhan ajan joulu (Christmas of the Old Time)
- Olaus Magnus: Suomalaiset pohjoisten kansojen historiassa (Finnish People in the History of Nordic Folks; edited)
- Linnut (The Birds)
- Pohjolan kalat (The Fishes in the Nordic Countries)
- Tapion tarha (Tapio's Fold)
- Suuriruhtinaan Suomi-sarja (Finland of the Grand Duke-serie)
- Iloinen 1950-luku. Purkkaa, sotakorvauksia sekä unelmia (Happy 1950s. Chewing Gum, Reparations and Dreams; edited with Sari Savikko)
- Suur-Kanteletar (Great Kanteletar; edited with Sari Savikko)
- Korven kultainen kuningas: pedot ja turkiseläimet veljekset von Wrightin ja aikalaisten kuvaamina (The Goldish King of the Back Woods: Predators and Fur Animals Described by Brothers von Wright and Their Contemporaries; edited with Sari Savikko)
- Elias Lönnrot: Flora Fennica 1-3 (edited with Sari Savikko)
- Vellamon väkeä: Veden elävät veljekset von Wrightin ja aikalaisten kuvaamina (The Folk in Swell: The Living Brothers of Water Described by Brothers von Wright and Their Contemporaries; edited with Sari Savikko)
- Onko lintu kotona? Sata siivekästä (Is a Bird at Home? Hundred Animals with Wings; with Sari Savikko)
- Jazztyttö keittää. Aino Helmisen ruokavuosi 1928 (The Jazz Girl Cooks. Aino Helminen's Dood Year 1928; with Hanna Pukkila, publisher Helmi-Kustannus)
