= Poitz =

Poitz is a Finnish, now extinct noble family, known since the 15th century. It is said to be of Pomeranian origin. Niklis Poitz received a letters patent of noble freedom (frälse) from Erik Axelsson Tott on 18 October 1463. The family owned the Poitsila manor in Vehkalahti, in the area of present-day Hamina. The Poitz family was admitted to the Swedish House of Nobility in 1636 under number 246. It became extinct probably in 1723.
