= Kaari Utrio =

Finnish author

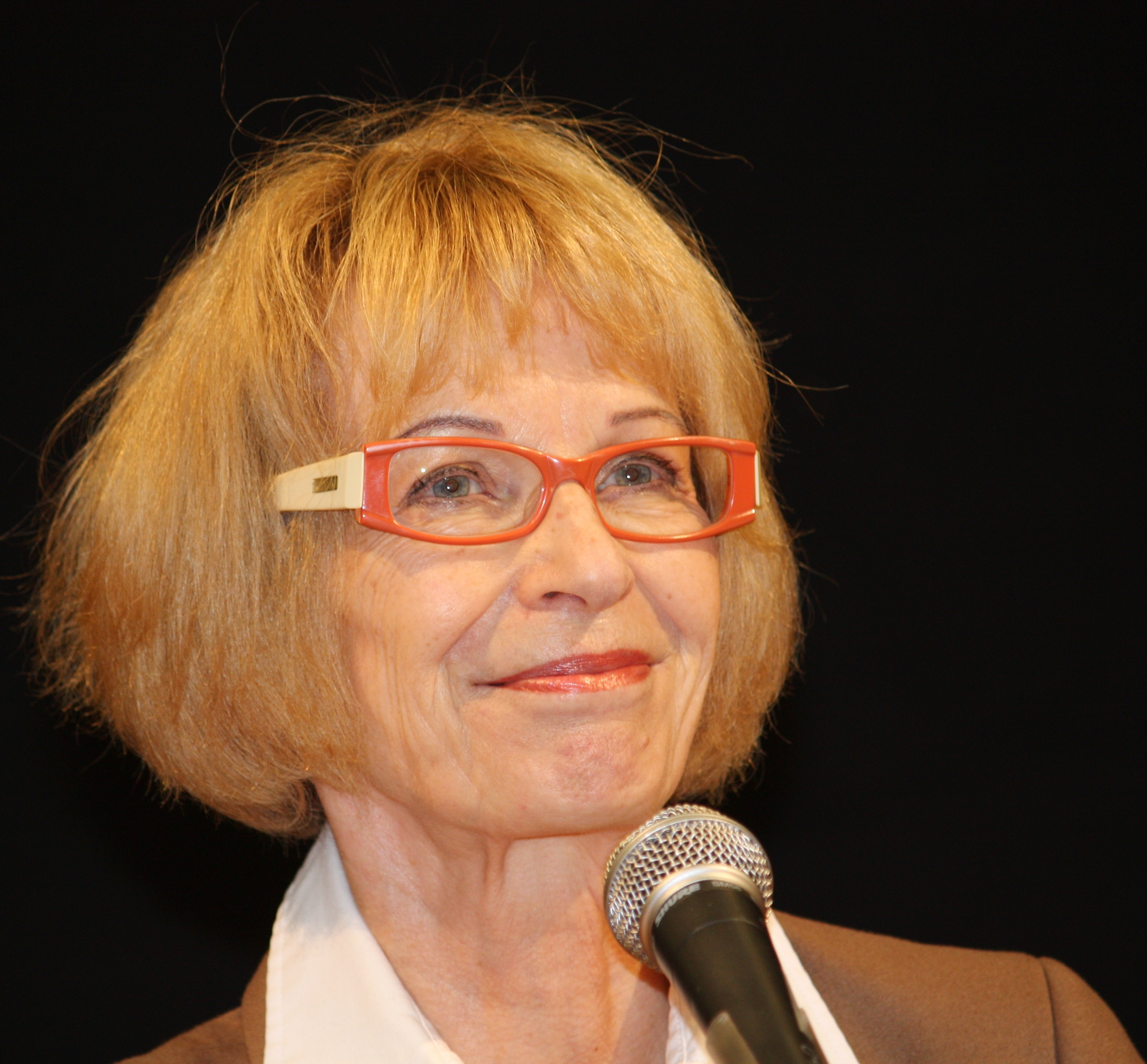
- Kaari Utrio in Turku Book Fair, 2011
- Born: Kaari Marjatta Utrio; 28 July 1942 (age 83) Helsinki, Finland
- Occupation: Novelist, historian
- Language: Finnish
- Period: 1968–2017

Kaari Marjatta Utrio (born 28 July 1942, official surname Utrio-Linnilä, formerly Virkajärvi) is a Finnish writer. She has written over 35 historical novels and 13 non-fiction books on historical topics. She is a historian, holding the degree of Master of Arts from the University of Helsinki, and has retired from the position of Professor in service of the Finnish State Commission of Fine Arts.

== Personal history ==
Kaari Utrio was born in Helsinki to a middle-class family. Her father was Untamo Utrio, who after the Winter War worked as CEO of Tammi, a Finnish publishing company. Her mother Meri Marjatta Utrio (née Vitikainen) was an editor, journalist and a translator of works into Finnish. There were over four thousand books in Utrio's childhood home in Tapiola, Espoo, and literature was valued in her family.

Utrio became acquainted with literature as a child, when her mother read her classics of world literature, such as Kipling and Shakespeare as bed-time stories. At the age of seven, the first book Utrio read by herself was a thick volume of Jokamiehen maailmanhistoria (World History for the Everyman). At school Utrio did well, especially in composition writing, even though she did not have any plans to become a writer at the time. Instead she wanted to become a historian. Carl Grimberg's Kansojen historia (History of Peoples) offered a lively description of history to the young Utrio.

Utrio matriculated in 1962 from Helsingin tyttölukio, a girls-only prep school college. After that, she studied history at the University of Helsinki and graduated as a Master of Arts in 1967, with history of Finland and Scandinavia as her major subject and general history as minor. Utrio had focused on medieval history and planned to research the Finnish Middle Ages. The following year, Utrio published her first novel Kartanonherra ja kaunis Kirstin (The Lord of the Manor and the Beautiful Kirstin), which was published by Tammi. The title was decided by the publisher, and Utrio did not like it. The book was, however, a start for Utrio's numerous other historical novels, which have so far been published at a steady pace, usually one per year. Utrio has also published many non-fiction books about history.

Utrio has three sons. In 1974 Utrio married Kai Linnilä. The next year, they moved to Somerniemi in Somero. At first, the couple tried their hand at self-sufficient agriculture, but gave it up after a couple of years. Instead, in 1982, Utrio and Linnilä founded a publishing company called Oy Amanita Ltd.

Utrio has been the chair of the Minna Canth Society since 1999. Utrio is a member of Amnesty International and has been on the board of the Finnish Association of Writers for several years. She has also been active in municipal politics as a non-committed member of the Social Democratic group of the Somero municipal government from 1980 to 1988, and the chair of the municipality's committee for library and culture. Her efforts to secure the election of a female President for the Republic of Finland had been remarkable: after making volunteer work in 1994 campaign for Elisabeth Rehn (who almost won, i.e. lost the 1994 presidential election by small margin), in 1999 professor Utrio joined the campaign for Tarja Halonen, serving in 1999–2000 and anew in 2005–2006 as chairperson of the non-party-committed Political Action Citizenry Delegation (PAC) for Tarja Halonen's success (Halonen got elected in 2000 and again on 2006).

Utrio was appointed an artistic professor for the years 1995 to 2000, in recognition of her work. Utrio has been an academic in the Väinö Tanner Foundation since 2000. She was awarded the Finnish State Publication Prize in 2002 for her life's work, and the Pro Finlandia medal in 1993.

== General works ==
The majority of Utrio's novels are historicals, set in a vast array of periods from Antiquity to the early 19th century; however, her specialty has always been the medieval period and it is for her medieval novels that she is mostly known. The main character is typically a woman, often somehow connected to Finland or Finnish history, although in the novel Vaskilintu (The Brass Bird) the other main character is a man, Eirik Väkevä. The setting is usually medieval Finland or its neighbouring countries, but faraway places like Constantinople and Calabria also feature.

The characters in Utrio's books are mostly fictional, but she also uses real historical figures as background characters. Utrio utilises her historical knowledge in great detail to strive for authenticity in depicting the lives of medieval people and to make history come alive for the readers. The private history of everyday life is a prominent element in her books, the lives of ordinary people taking precedence over political events. Everyday life is described from a woman's point of view, also reflecting the inferior position of women in historical times. Utrio writes strong and capable heroines who are able to achieve relatively good positions in life because of their strength and love.

Utrio can be seen continuing the tradition of the Finnish historical novel, including authors like Zachris Topelius, Santeri Ivalo, Mika Waltari and Ursula Pohjolan-Pirhonen. However, Utrio renewed the Finnish historical novel as a genre by raising female characters to the fore and by exploring the role women have always had in the private sphere, maintaining not only the home but social cohesion. All of her books include themes of progress: things are improved by people actively searching for new solutions. She is considered one of the founders of historical entertainment in Finnish literature, alongside of Pohjolan-Pirhonen. Utrio also hardly ever uses the present tense in her narratives.

Utrio's non-fiction works focus on the history of women and children, whose lives otherwise remain often hidden because of lack of historical sources, and usually are not discussed in historical narratives. Eevan tyttäret (The Daughters of Eve) is one of Utrio's most notable non-fiction books. The book describes the history of women from the ancient Middle East and ancient Greece until modern times. The book has achieved international notice, and has been translated into seven languages.

Her career as a widely published author lasted approximately fifty years. She started in 1967 working her first novel (that came out in 1968). Utrio strived to publish a new novel each year. In 2019 Utrio announced that her working days are over. Her 2017 book remains her last publication. Ever since her first novel that came out in 1968, she has been one of Finland's most-read authors and published quite regularly. It has been argued on the Kirjasampo website (the representative of public libraries in Finland), that she has been the single most influential author to have shaped Finnish women's thinking. Her 1968 novel reached already in its first year tens of thousands of readers. Hundreds of thousands of Finnish women have, since 1968, read and been influenced by Utrio's views inherent in her books, such as need for equality between genders, existence of female strength, practical family values, and non-religiosity, as well as fact-based comprehension of circumstances, mentalities and conditions of human life in a selection of past centuries, usually in agrarian economy.

== Works ==
=== Novels ===
- Kartanonherra ja kaunis Kirstin (The Lord of the Manor and the Beautiful Kirstin) (Tammi 1968, also named Kirstin, Tammi 1998)
- Sunneva Jaarlintytär (Sunneva, Daughter of the Jarl) (Tammi 1969)
- Sunneva keisarin kaupungissa (Sunneva in the Imperial City) (Tammi 1970)
- Vehkalahden neidot (The Maidens of Vehkalahti) (Tammi 1971)
- Pirita, Karjalan tytär (Pirita, Daughter of Karelia) (Tammi 1972)
- Viipurin kaunotar (The Beauty of Viborg) (Tammi 1973)
- Aatelisneito, porvaristyttö (The Noble Maiden, The Burgher's Daughter) (Tammi 1974)
- Kun nainen hallitsi, rakasti ja vihasi (When a Woman Ruled, Loved and Hated) (Tammi 1975)
- Pirkkalan pyhät pihlajat (The Sacred Rowan Trees of Pirkkala) (Tammi 1976)
- Pappilan neidot (The Damsels of the Vicarage) (Tammi 1977)
- Rakas Henrietta (My Dear Henrietta) (Tammi 1977)
- Karjalan kruunu (The Crown of Karelia) (Tammi 1978)
- Rautalilja (The Iron Lily) (Tammi 1979)
- Neidontanssi (The Maiden Dance) (Tammi 1980)
- Porvarin morsian (The Bride of the Burgher) (Kolmiokirja 1980)
- Katarinan taru (The Story of Katarina) (Tammi 1981)
- Pormestarin tytär (The Daughter of the Mayor) (Tammi 1982)
- Ruusulaakso (The Rose Valley) (Tammi 1982)
- Isabella (Isabella) (Tammi 1988)
- Kuka olet, Elissa? (Who Are You, Elissa?) (Tammi 1989)
- Vendela (Vendela) (Tammi 1989)
- Haukka, minun rakkaani (The Falcon, My Love) (Tammi 1990)
- Vanajan Joanna (Joanna of Vanaja) (Tammi 1991)
- Vaskilintu (The Bronze Bird) (Tammi 1992)
- Uhritulet (The Sacrificial Fires) (Tammi 1993)
- Kuukiven kevät (The Spring of the Moonstone) (Otava 1995)
- Tuulihaukka (The Kestrel, Wind Falcon) (Tammi 1995)
- Iisalmen serkku ja muita kertomuksia (The Cousin from Iisalmi and Other Stories) (Tammi 1996)
- Katarina (Katarina) (A combination of the books Neidontanssi and Katarinan Taru; Tammi 1998)
- Yksisarvinen (The Unicorn) (Tammi 2000)
- Ruma kreivitär (The Ugly Countess) (Tammi 2002)
- Saippuaprinsessa (The Soap Princess) (Tammi 2004)
- Ilkeät sisarpuolet (The Wicked Stepsisters) (Tammi 2007)
- Vaitelias perillinen (The Taciturn Heir) (Tammi 2009)
- Oppinut neiti (The Learned Miss) (Amanita 2011)
- Seuraneiti (A Lady's Companion) (Amanita 2013)
- Paperiprinssi (The Paper Prince) (Amanita 2015)
- Hupsu rakkaus (Amanita 2017)

=== Non fiction, factual history ===
- Somero: viljan maa (Somero: The Land of Grain) (with Kai Linnilä, Amanita 1982)
- Suomalaisia taiteilijakoteja (Finnish Artists' Homes) (only the introduction, Kuurojen liitto 1982)
- Eevan tyttäret (The Daughters of Eve) (Tammi 1984)
- Eevan historia (The History of Eve) (Amanita 1985)
- Venus (Venus) (Tammi 1985)
- Kalevan tyttäret (The Daughters of Kaleva) (Tammi 1986)
- Laps' Suomen (The Child of Finland) (with Kaarina Helakisa; Otava 1987)
- Vuosisatainen Viipuri (The Century in Viipuri) (Tammi 1991)
- Suuri prinsessakirja (The Great Princess Book) (with Kaarina Helakisa and Matti Kota; Otava 1991)
- Suomi silloin kerran (Finland, Once Upon a Time) (with Kai Linnilä, Meri Utrio and Lauri Haataja; Tammi 1992)
- Rusoposkia, huulten purppuraa (Rosy Cheeks, Purple Lips) (with Una Nuotio and Taina Heikkilä; Tekniikan museo 1995)
- Familia 1-6 (Familia) (with Many Writers; Tammi 1995–1997)
- Perhekirja (The Family Book) (Tammi 1998)
- Bella Donna (Bella Donna) (with Sari Savikko; Tammi 2001)

=== Other works ===
- Tulin onneni yrttitarhaan (I Came into the Herb Garden of my Happiness) (with Salme Sauri; Otava 1988)
- Ruusulamppu (The Rose Lamp) (Kaisaniemen Dynamo 2002) (it was a booklet written for a company, is a story seemingly of the genre of historical fiction, and the company uses/used it as business gift - formerly: No information is available of the nature of this book)
