= Huusgafvel =

Huusgavel, Huusgafvel, or Husgafvel, is listed as number 2102 on the List of Swedish noble families. The family originates from Vehkalahti (Veckelax), Finland.
