= Otava (publisher) =

Finnish publisher

Otava Publishing Company Kustannusosakeyhtiö Otava
- Parent company: Otava Group
- Founded: 1890
- Founder: Hannes Gebhard and Eliel Aspelin-Haapkylä
- Country of origin: Finland
- Headquarters location: Helsinki
- Publication types: Books
- Official website: otava.fi

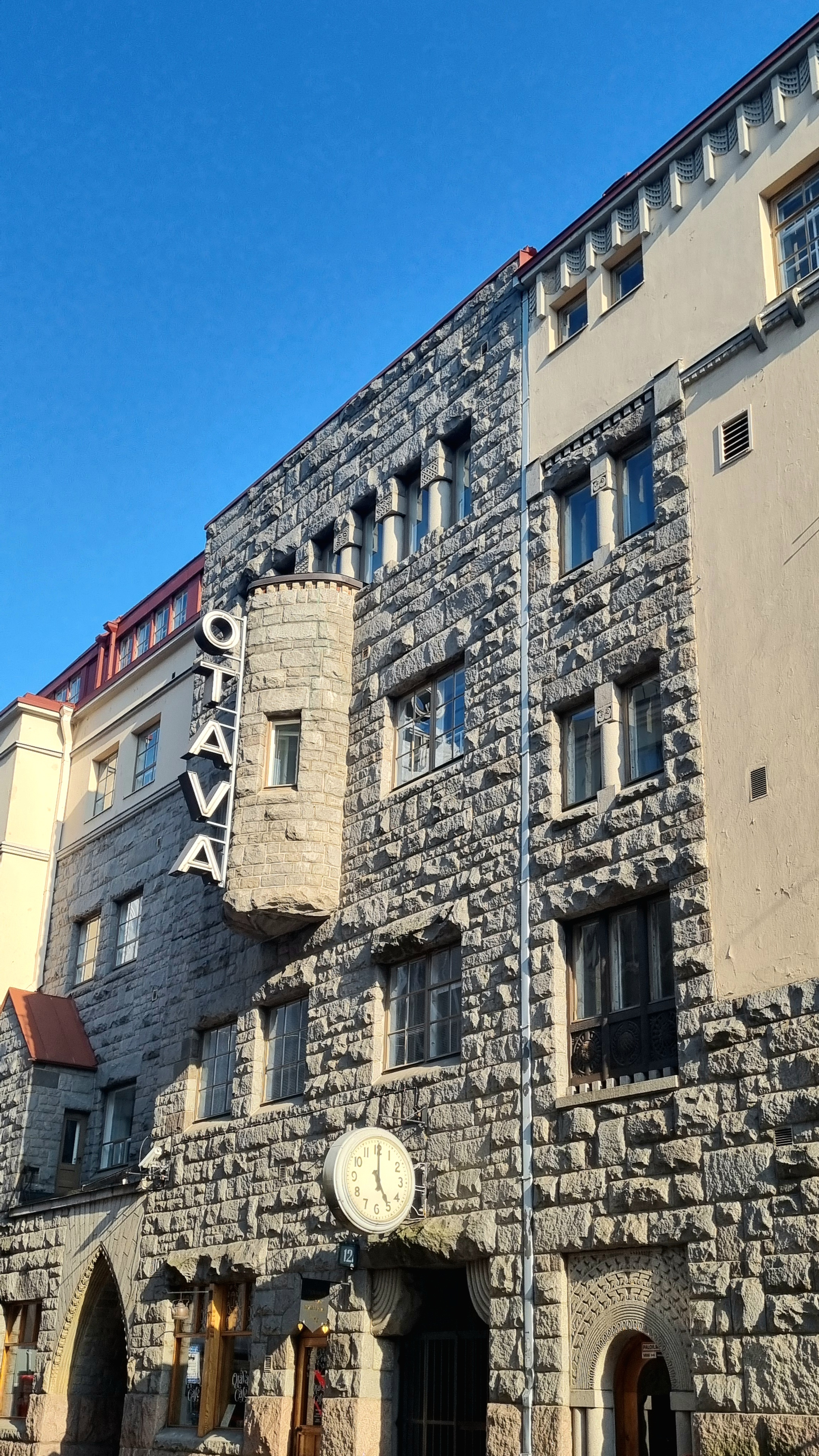
Otava headquarters building in central Helsinki, designed by Karl Lindahl and Walter Thomé in 1905

Otava Publishing Company Ltd (Finnish: Kustannusosakeyhtiö Otava, Swedish: Förlagsaktiebolaget Otava) is a major Finnish publisher of books. It was founded in 1890 and is now the second largest publisher in Finland. It publishes fiction, non-fiction, books for teenagers and children, multimedia and teaching materials. The number of new titles exceeds 400 a year. Otava has also been at the forefront of encyclopedia publishing in Finland with many well-known series, such as the Otavan Suuri Ensyklopedia (The Great Otava Encyclopedia). Writers whose work Otava has published over the years include Frans Emil Sillanpää, Eino Leino, Paavo Haavikko, Pentti Saarikoski and Laila Hirvisaari. The parent company Otava Group also owns the major bookstore chain, Suomalainen Kirjakauppa.

The name "Otava" refers to the Big Dipper.

== History ==
Otava was founded in 1890 by Hannes Gebhard and Eliel Aspelin-Haapkylä to publish Finnish national literature. Alvar Renqvist became managing director in 1893 and was the main figure during the company's early years. His descendants (surname fennicized to Reenpää) have continued his work so that Otava remains, in spite of its size, to a large extent a family company. 1906 saw the completion of the new headquarters right in the centre of Helsinki. In 1908 printing press operations began and in 1916 the printing of magazines got under way. The first magazine to be launched was Suomen Kuvalehti, which still comes out weekly. From 1945 to 1991 the company was listed in the Helsinki Stock Exchange. In 1955 a new printing house was put up in Keuruu, near Jyväskylä. During the 1960s Otava faced grave financial difficulties but was able to pull through by rationalizing operations. In 1998 it bought out its rival company WSOY from the jointly owned Yhtyneet Kuvalehdet, a large publisher of magazines.

Since the beginning of 2006, Otava has also owned the book publishing operations of Like Kustannus. In addition, the book division includes Suuri Suomalainen Kirjakerho (the Great Finnish Book Club). The Otava Group consists of four business areas: books, magazines, retail and new business operations. Printing operations are handled by Otavan Kirjapaino Oy in Keuruu.

On 31 December 2014, Otava purchased a majority shareholding in the book publisher Moreeni. Its publishing operations continued under the same name. In 2015 Otava acquired the entire share capital of F-Kustannus Oy, publisher of the Suuri toivelaulukirja series, among other titles. The purchase of Kustannusosakeyhtiö Nemo followed in 2016, and at the beginning of 2018 the educational materials publisher Oy Finn Lectura Ab came into Otava's ownership. In autumn 2020 Otava bought the shares held by the Svenska folkskolans vänner association, the principal owner of the general publisher Atena. Atena continued its operations in Jyväskylä, retaining its own name, its own publishing programme and its existing staff.

== Publications ==
- This is Finland (2007)
