= Tammi (company) =

Finnish publishing company

- Industry: Book publishing
- Founded: 1943; 83 years ago
- Founder: Väinö Tanner
- Headquarters: Finland
- Owner: Bonnier Group
- Website: www.tammi.fi

Tammi, also known as Kustannusyhtiö Tammi and Tammi Publishers, is a Finnish publishing company established in 1943 by an initiative of Väinö Tanner, leader of the Social Democratic Party of Finland. In 1996, the company was bought by the Bonnier Group, and, as of the early 2000s, it was the third largest book publisher in Finland. In 2018, the company was merged into the Finnish book publishing company Werner Söderström Osakeyhtiö (WSOY). Tammi was formerly known as Kustannusosakeyhtiö Tammi.

Its series Keltainen kirjasto (Yellow library), published since 1954, specialises in "quality literature", including books by many recipients of the Nobel Prize in Literature.

== Controversy over Yrjö Leino memoirs ==
Yrjö Leino, a Communist activist, was Finland's Minister of the Interior in the crucial 1945–48 period. In 1948 he suddenly resigned for reasons which remain unclear and went into retirement. Leino returned to the public eye in 1958 with his memoirs of his time as Minister of the Interior, which were due to be published by Tammi. The manuscript was prepared in secret – even most of the Tammi staff were kept in ignorance – but the project was revealed by Leino because of an indiscretion just before the planned publication. It turned out the Soviet Union was very strongly opposed to publication of the memoirs. The Soviet Union's Chargé d'Affaires in Finland Ivan Filippov (Ambassador Viktor Lebedev had suddenly departed from Finland a few weeks earlier on 21 October 1958) demanded that Prime Minister Karl-August Fagerholm's government prevent the release of Leino's memoirs. Fagerholm said that the government could legally do nothing because the work had not yet been released nor was there censorship in Finland. Filippov advised that if Leino's book was published, the Soviet Union would draw "serious conclusions". Later the same day Fagerholm called the Tammi publisher, Untamo Utrio, and it was decided that the January launch of the book was to be cancelled. Eventually, the entire print run of the book was destroyed at the Soviet Union's request. Almost all of the books – some 12,500 copies – were burned in August 1962 with the exception of a few volumes which were furtively sent to political activists. Deputy director of Tammi Jarl Hellemann later argued that the fuss about the book was completely disproportionate to its substance, describing the incident as the first instance of Finnish self-censorship motivated by concerns about relations to the Soviet Union (see Finlandization). The book was finally published in 1991, when interest in it had largely dissipated.
