= List of Swedish-speaking Finns =

This is a list of Swedish-speaking Finns.

To be included in this list, the person must have a Wikipedia article showing they are a Swedish-speaking Finn or must have references showing they are a Swedish-speaking Finn and are notable.

== Actors, directors and filmmakers ==
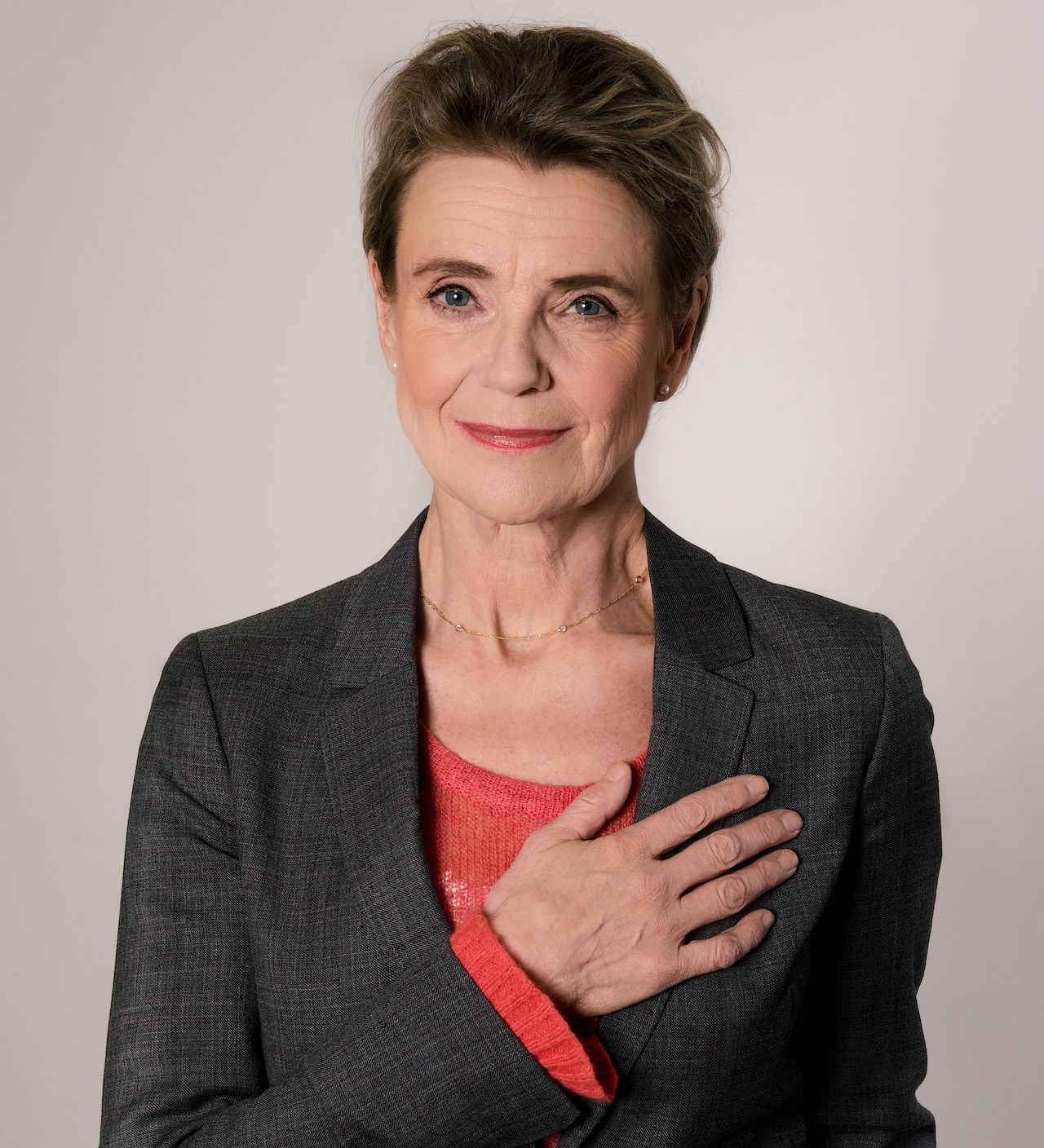
Stina Ekblad

- Ida Aalberg – actor (1857–1915)
- Irina Björklund – actor and singer (1973– )
- Jörn Donner – writer, film director, actor, producer, politician, and founder of Finnish Film Archive (1933–2020)
- Stina Ekblad – actor (1954– )
- Klaus Härö – filmmaker (1971– )
- Nicke Lignell – actor, voice actor, and television host (1966– )
- Åke Lindman – director and actor (1928–2009)
- Lasse Pöysti – actor, director, theatre manager, and writer (1927–2019)
- Birgitta Ulfsson – actor and theatre director (1928–2017)
- Casper Wrede – theatre and film director (1929–1998)

== Architects ==
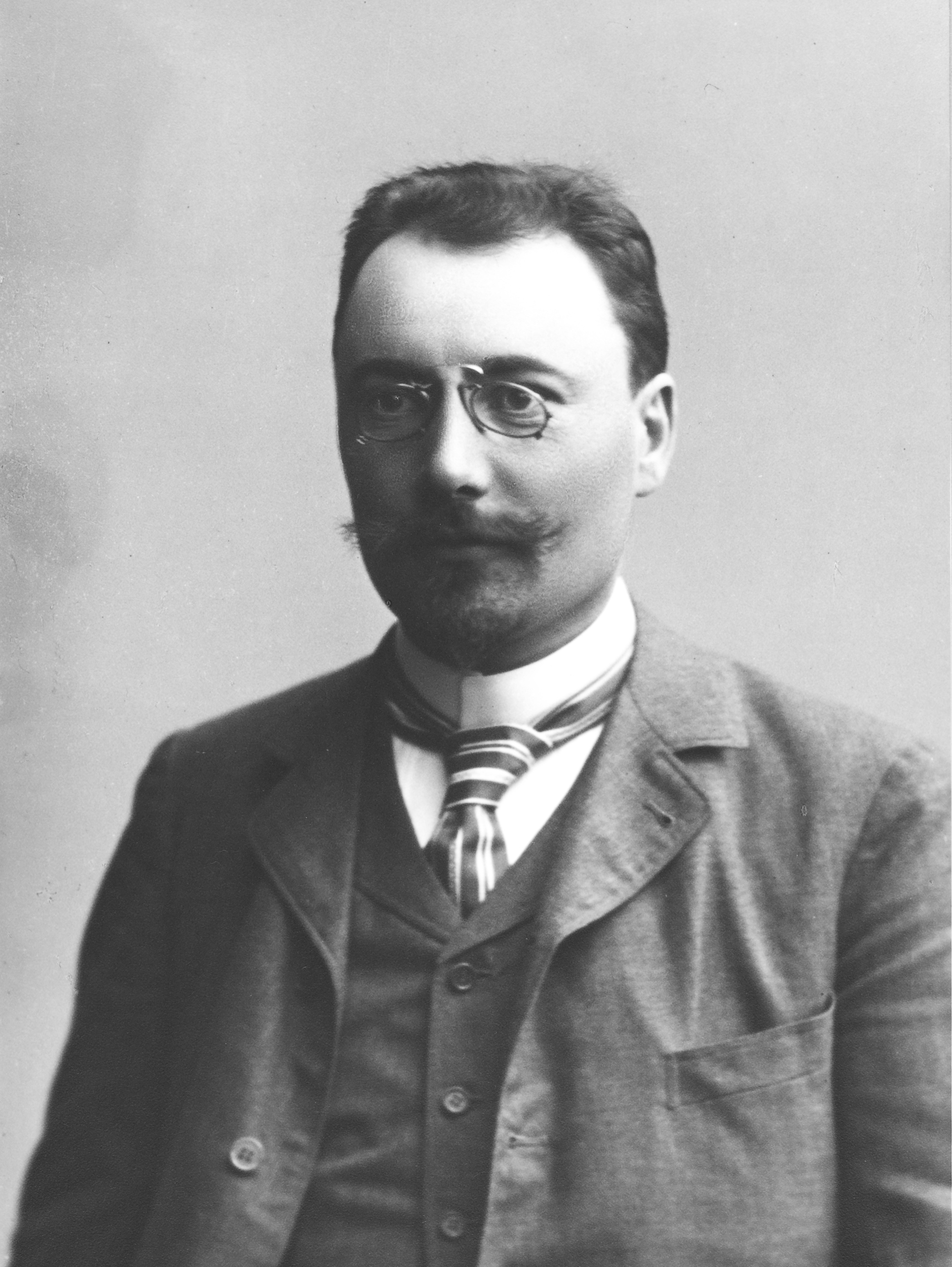
Lars Sonck

- Kristian Gullichsen (1932–2021)
- Anton Werner Lignell (1867–1954)
- Viljo Revell (1910–1964)
- Lars Sonck (1870–1956)

== Artists and designers ==
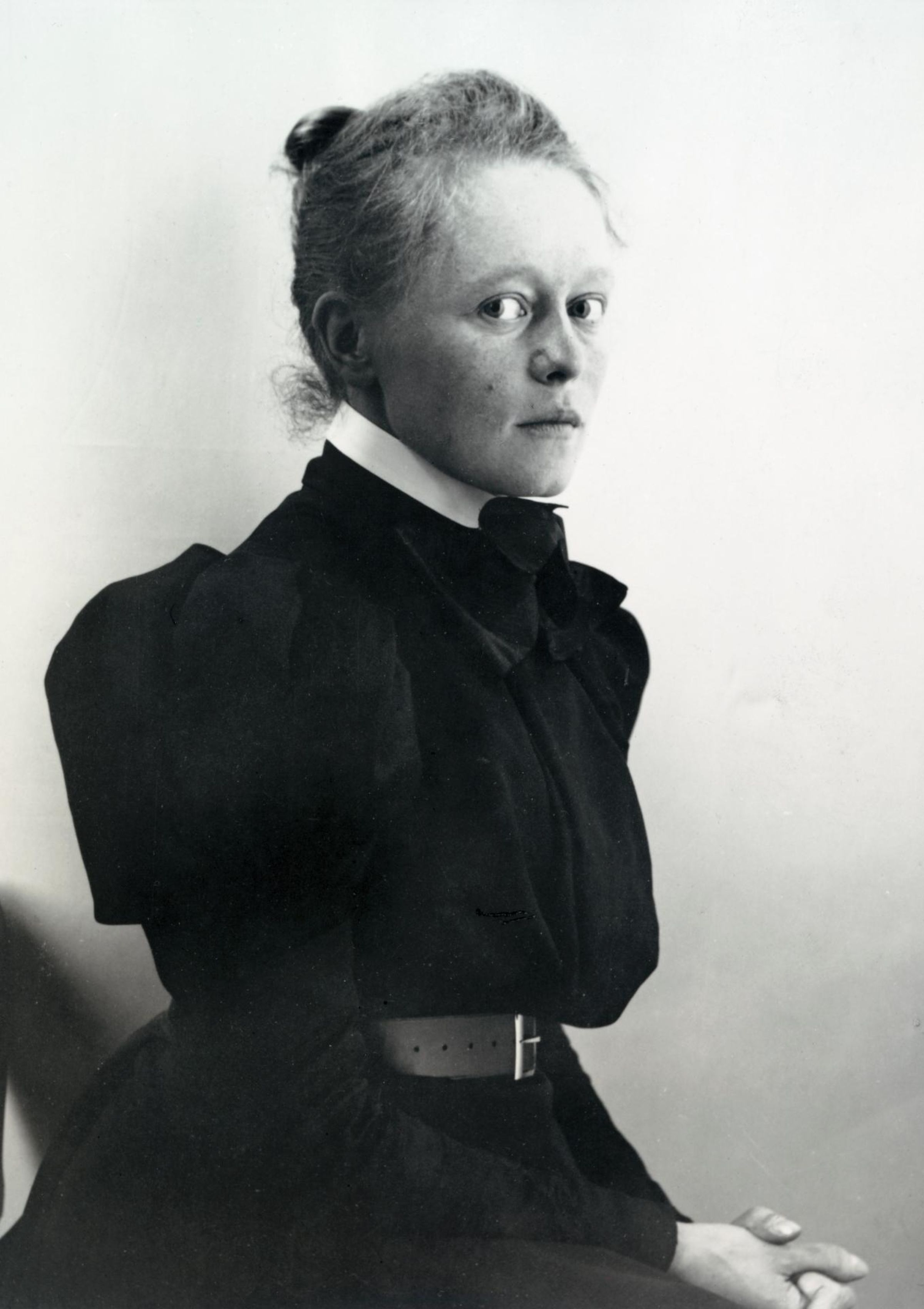
Helene Schjerfbeck, painter

- Erik Bruun – graphic designer (1926– )
- Fanny Churberg – painter (1845–1892)
- Albert Edelfelt – painter (1854–1905)
- Magnus Enckell – painter (1870–1925)
- Kaj Franck – industrial designer, artistic director, and instructor of applied arts (1911–1989)
- Akseli Gallen-Kallela – painter (1865–1931)
- Jorma Gallen-Kallela – painter (1898–1939)
- Eero Järnefelt – painter (1863–1937)
- Rudolf Koivu – illustrator (1890–1946)
- Stefan Lindfors – industrial designer, interior designer, film-maker, and sculptor (1962– )
- Helene Schjerfbeck – painter (1862–1946)
- Hugo Simberg – painter (1873–1917)
- Kaj Stenvall – painter (1951– )
- Beda Stjernschantz – painter (1867–1910)

== Businesspeople ==
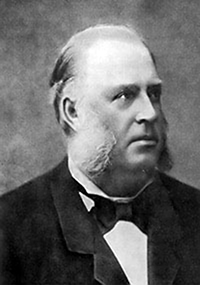
Fredrik Idestam

- Antti Ahlström – industrialist, founder of Ahlstrom (1827–1896)
- Kaj Arnö – CEO of the MariaDB Foundation (1963– )
- Karl Fazer – founder of confectionery manufacturer Fazer and Olympic sport-shooter (1866–1932)
- Rabbe Grönblom – founder of Kotipizza, RG Line, Omenahotelli (1950–2015)
- Hjallis Harkimo – chairman of the board of Jokerit (1953– )
- Fredrik Idestam – industrialist, founder of Nokia (1838–1916)
- Mikael Lilius – ex-CEO of Fortum (1948– )
- Mårten Mickos – ex-CEO of MySQL AB, currently CEO at HackerOne (1962– )
- Georg Franz Stockmann – founder of the Stockmann department store (1825–1906)
- Björn Wahlroos – Chairman of the Board in Sampo plc, Nordea and UPM-Kymmene Oyj (1952– )

== Musicians ==
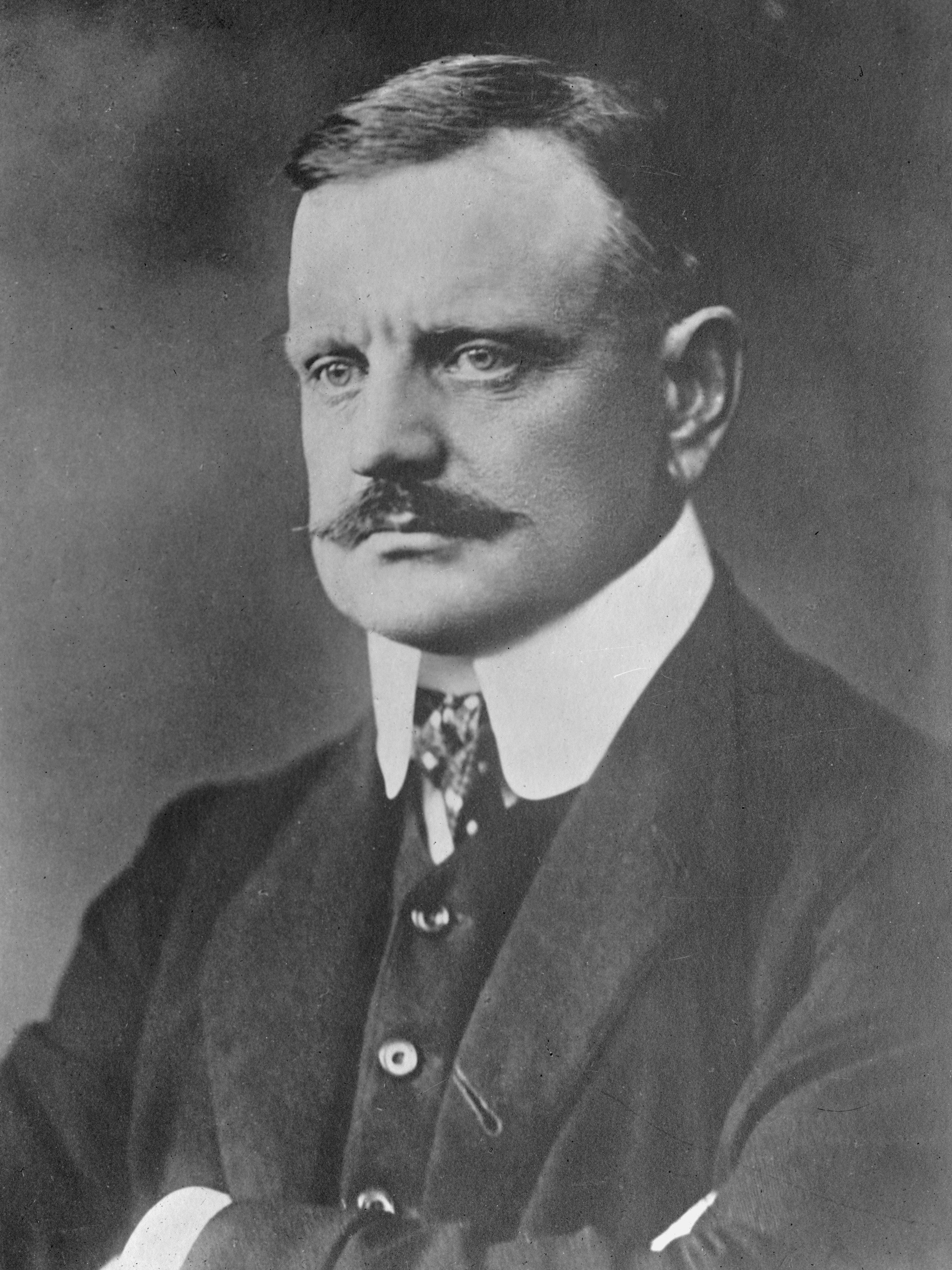
Jean Sibelius

=== Opera ===
- Monica Groop – mezzo-soprano (1958– )

=== Classical ===
- Paavo Berglund – conductor and violinist (1929–2012)
- Erik Bergman – composer (1911–2006)
- Bernhard Crusell – clarinetist, composer, and translator (1775–1838)
- Mikko Franck – conductor and violinist (1978– )
- Ralf Gothoni – pianist and conductor (1946– )
- Tom Krause – opera singer and vocal pedagogue (1934–2013)
- Magnus Lindberg – composer and pianist (1958– )
- Linda Lampenius (stage name Linda Brava) – concert violinist; also known for work as a model, actress, member of the Helsinki City Council, and Sports 2000 rally driver (1970– )
- Ossi Runne – trumpeter, orchestra leader, composer, and record producer (1927–2020)
- Leif Segerstam – conductor, composer, violinist, violist, and pianist (1944– )
- Jean Sibelius – composer (1865–1957)
- John Storgårds – violinist and conductor (1963– )
- Martin Wegelius – composer and musicologist (1846–1906)

=== Various genres ===
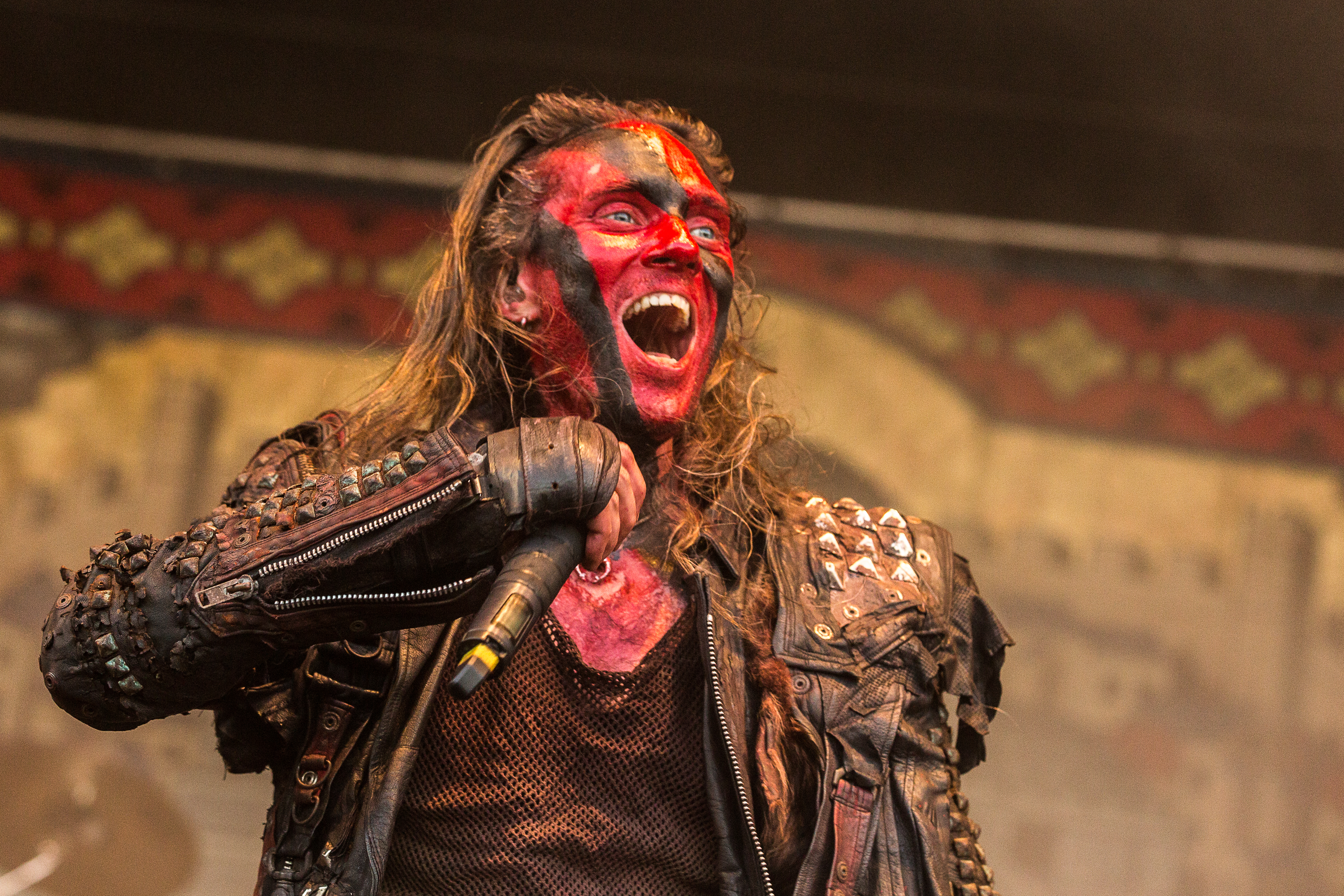
Mathias "Warlord" Nygård of Turisas

- Ami Aspelund – singer (1953– )
- Monica Aspelund – singer (1946– )
- Henrik Otto Donner – composer, musician, trumpeter, record producer, and music personality (1939–2013)
- Axel Ehnström (stage name Paradise Oskar) – singer-songwriter (1990– )
- Janina Fry née Frostell – pop singer, model, and television host (1973– )
- Ben Granfelt – guitarist; best known for work with the Ben Granfelt Band, Leningrad Cowboys, and Wishbone Ash (1963– )
- Kim Herold – singer-songwriter (1979– )
- Jan "Katla" Jämsen – co-founder, songwriter, and former singer of folk metal band Finntroll (c. 1980s– )
- Pernilla Karlsson – singer (1990– )
- Mathias "Vreth" Lillmåns – metal vocalist and bassist; best known for work with Finntroll (1982– )
- André Linman – songwriter, rock singer and guitarist; best known for work with Sturm Und Drang (1992– )
- Georg Malmstén – singer, musician, composer, and conductor (1902–1981)
- Patrik Mennander – metal and rock singer; best known for work with Ruoska, Battlelore, and Natsipaska (1976– )
- Kristian Meurman – singer (1979– )
- Nasty Suicide (born Jan-Markus Stenfors) – guitarist, bass guitarist, and singer; best known for work with glam rock band Hanoi Rocks (1963– )
- Mathias "Warlord" Nygård – co-founder and lead vocalist of metal band Turisas (1982– )
- Krista Siegfrids – pop singer (1985– )
- Gösta Sundqvist – lead singer, composer, and lyricist of Leevi and the Leavings and a radio-personality (1957–2003)
- Jenny Wilhelms – composer and musician focused on Nordic vocal and fiddling traditions; lead singer of folk and world music band Gjallarhorn (1974– )

== Politicians ==
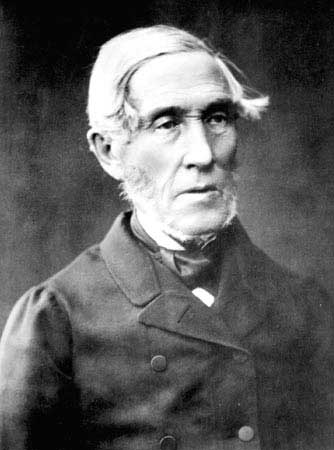
Johan Vilhelm Snellman

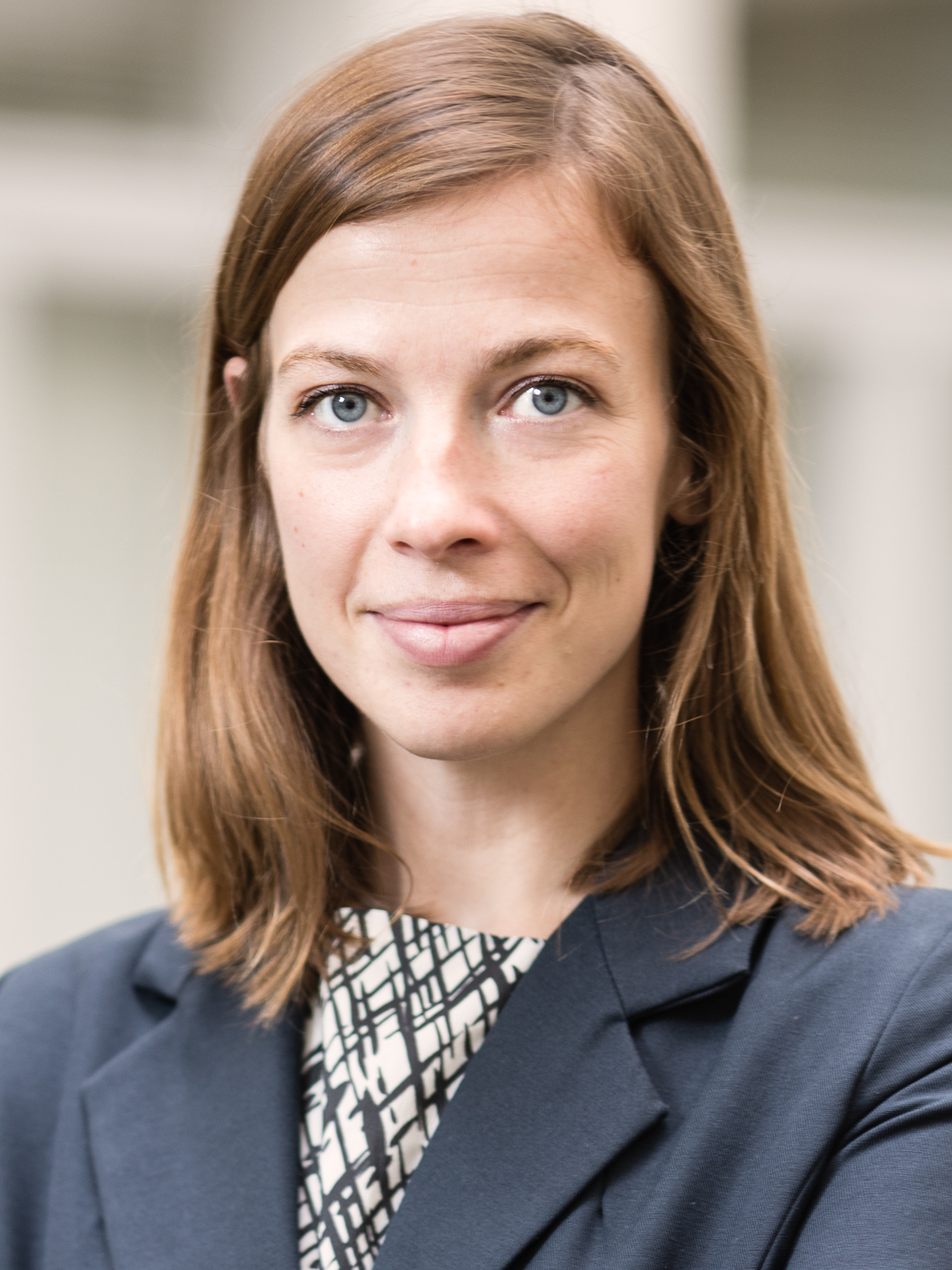
Li Andersson

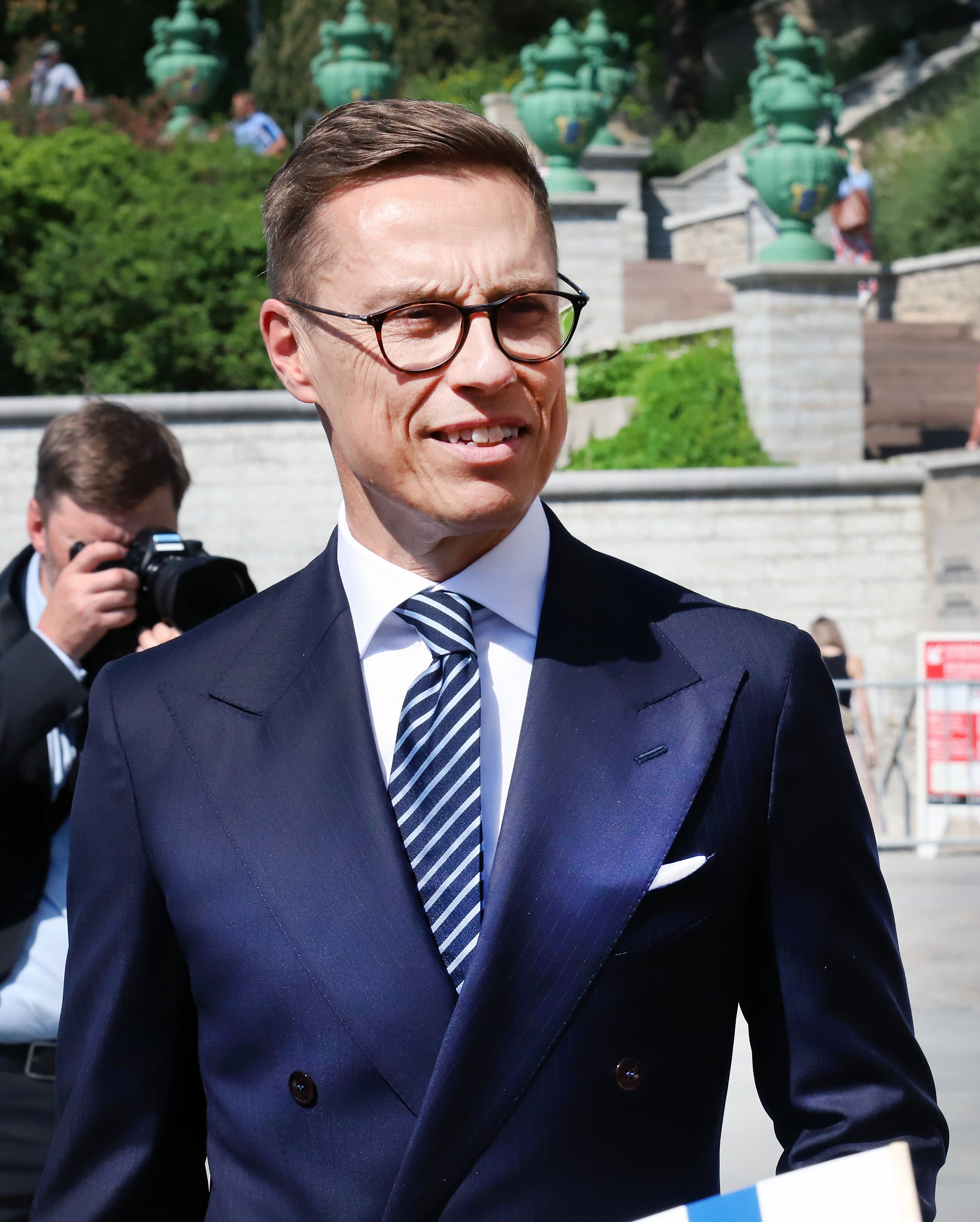
Alexander Stubb

- Claes Andersson – member of parliament, 1987 to 1999 and 2007 to 2008, and Minister of Culture, 1995 to 1999 (1937–2019)
- Li Andersson – member of parliament since 2015; leader of the Left Alliance since 2016; and Minister of Education since 2019 (1987– )
- Jan-Erik Enestam – member of parliament, 1991 to 2007; Minister of the Interior, 1995 to 1999; Minister of Defense, 1995 and 1999 to 2003; Minister of the Environment, 2003 to 2006 (1947– )
- Axel Olof Freudenthal – philologist and academic, considered by the Swedish People's Party to be their spiritual father (1836–1911)
- Karl-August Fagerholm – three-time Prime Minister of Finland during the late-1940s and 1950s (1901–1984)
- Carl Haglund – member of the European Parliament, 2009 to 2012; Minister of Defence, 2012 to 2015; leader of the Swedish People's Party, 2012 to 2016; and member of parliament, 2015 to 2016 (1979– )
- Anna-Maja Henriksson – member of parliament since 2007; Minister of Justice, 2011–2015 and since 2019; and leader of the Swedish People's Party since 2016 (1964– )
- Tony Halme – member of parliament, 2003 to 2007; MMA fighter, boxer, sports entertainer and professional wrestler (1963–2010)
- Bjarne Kallis – member of parliament, 1991 to 2011, and chairman of the Christian Democratic Party, 1995 to 2004 (1945– )
- Henrik Lax – member of parliament, 1987 to 2004, and member of the European Parliament, 2004 to 2009 (1946– )
- Axel Lille – member of the Diet of Finland, 1885 to 1900; principal founder of the Swedish People's Party in 1906; member of parliament, 1916 to 1917; journalist and editor (1848–1921)
- Gustaf Mannerheim – Regent of Finland, 1918 to 1919; commander-in-chief, 1939 to 1945; and President of Finland, 1944 to 1946 (1867–1951)
- Elisabeth Rehn – member of parliament, 1979 to 1995; leader of the Swedish People's Party, 1987 to 1990; Minister of Defense, 1990 to 1995; member of the European Parliament, 1995 to 1996; and diplomat to the United Nations (1935– )
- Johan Vilhelm Snellman – member of the Senate of Finland, Fennoman philosopher, author, and journalist (1806–1881)
- Alexander Stubb – member of European Parliament, 2004 to 2008; member of parliament, 2011 to 2017; Minister for Foreign Affairs, 2008 to 2011; Minister for Foreign Trade and Development, 2011 to 2014; leader of the National Coalition Party, 2014 to 2016; Minister of Finance, 2015 to 2016; 43rd Prime Minister of Finland, 2014 to 2015; and 13th President of Finland, since 2024 (1968– )
- Ulf Sundqvist – member of parliament, 1970 to 1983; Minister of Education, 1972 to 1975; Minister of Trade and Industry, 1979 to 1981; head of the National Workers' Savings Bank, 1982 to 1991; and leader of the Social Democratic Party of Finland, 1991 to 1993 (1945– )
- Pehr Evind Svinhufvud – member of the Diet of Finland, 1894 and 1899 to 1906; member of parliament, 1907 to 1908, 1908 to 1914, 1917, and 1930 to 1931; chairman of the Senate of Finland, 1917 to 1918; Regent of Finland in 1918; Prime Minister of Finland, 1930 to 1931; and the 3rd President of Finland, 1931–1937 (1861–1944)
- Carl Olof Tallgren – member of parliament, 1961 to 1975; Minister of Finance, 1970 to 1971; and chairman of the Swedish People's Party, 1974 to 1977 (1927– )
- Stefan Wallin – member of parliament, 2007 to 2019; Minister of the Environment in 2007; Minister of Culture and Sport, 2007 to 2011; and Minister of Defence, 2011 to 2012 (1967– )
- Theodor Wegelius – member of the Senate of Finland (1850–1932)
- Rolf Witting - member of parliament, 1924-1927; Minister of Communication 1924-1925; Minister of Forgein Affairs 1933-1936 and 1940-1943 (1879-1944)
- Alexander Frey (politician) (1877-1945)
- Axel Palmgren (1867-1939)
- Julius Stjernvall (1974-1939)
- Leo Ehrnrooth (1877-1951)
- Ralf Törngren - Minister of Finance 1945-1948; Prime Minister 1954 and chairman of the Swedish People's Party 1945-1955 (1899-1961)

== Scientists and technologists ==
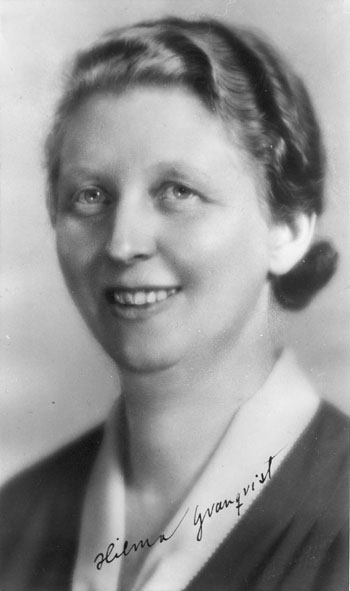
Hilma Granqvist

- Lars Valerian Ahlfors – mathematician and Fields Medalist in 1936; known for work in the fields of Riemann surfaces and complex analysis (1907–1996)
- Erik Allardt – sociologist, professor, and chancellor of the Åbo Akademi University (1925–2020)
- Fredrik Elfving – botanist, plant physiologist, and university administrator (1854–1942)
- Gustav Elfving – mathematician and statistician; known for pioneering work in the optimal design of experiments (1908–1984)
- Kari Enqvist – physicist and professor of cosmology (1954– )
- Axel Olof Freudenthal – philologist and academic, considered by the Swedish People's Party to be their spiritual father (1836–1911)
- Johan Gadolin – chemist, physicist, and mineralogist; best known for his description of the first rare-earth element, yttrium (1760–1852)
- Ragnar Granit – physiologist and professor of neurophysiology; joint Nobel Laureate in Physiology or Medicine in 1967 (1900–1991)
- Hilma Granqvist – anthropologist; best known for long field studies of Palestinians (1890–1972)
- Pehr Kalm – botanist, naturalist, explorer, and agricultural economist (1716–1779)
- Rafael Karsten – social anthropologist and philosopher of religion; best known for work among indigenous peoples of South America (1879–1956)
- Anders Johan Lexell – astronomer, mathematician, and physicist; best known for work in the fields of celestial mechanics and polygonometry, particularly spherical trigonometry (1740–1784)
- Ernst Lindelöf – mathematician; best known for work in the fields of function theory and topology (1870–1946)
- Lorenz Lindelöf – mathematician, astronomer, and researcher of variational calculus; Minister of State Education, 1874–1902 (1827–1908)
- Karl F. Lindman – physicist and former vice rector of Åbo Akademi University; best known for work on artificial chiral media (1874–1952)
- Hjalmar Mellin – mathematician; best known for work in the field of function theory and as developer of the integral transform known as the Mellin transform (1854–1933)
- Pekka Myrberg – mathematician and university administrator; best known for work in the field of function theory, particularly iteration and period-doubling bifurcation (1892–1976)
- Edvard Neovius – mathematician known for his work in the field of minimal surface; member of the Senate of Finland (1851–1917)
- Nils Gustaf Nordenskiöld – mineralogist and traveler; best known as discoverer of alexandrite and several other minerals (1792–1866)
- Linus Torvalds – creator of Linux kernel (1969– )
- Michael Widenius – main developer of MySQL (1962– )
- Erik Adolf von Willebrand – physician; best known for his work in the field of hematology (1870–1949)
- Edvard Westermarck – sociologist and philosopher; known as "the first sociobiologist," he is best remembered for his work in the field of marriage (1862–1939)
- Georg Henrik von Wright – logician and philosopher; best known for work in the fields of analytic philosophy and philosophical logic and, later, morality and philosophical pessimism (1916–2003)

== Soldiers ==
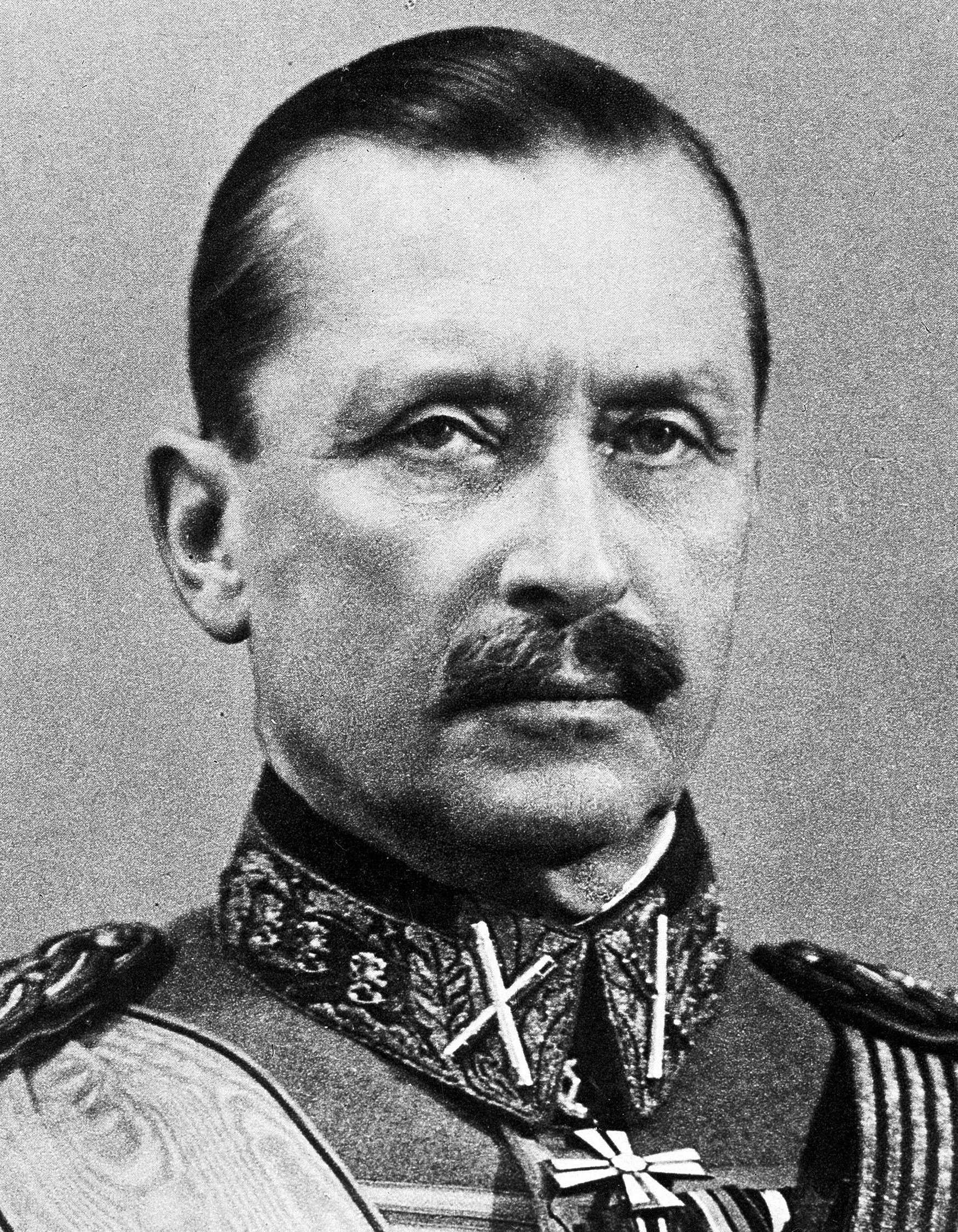
Carl Gustaf Emil Mannerheim

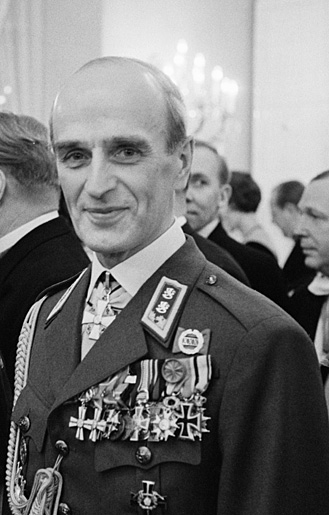
Adolf Ehrnrooth

- Adolf Ehrnrooth – general (1905–2004)
- Johan Casimir Ehrnrooth – lieutenant-general, Prime Minister of Bulgaria (1833–1913)
- Oskar Ferdinand Gripenberg – general of the infantry (1838–1916)
- Carl Gustaf Casimir Gripenberg – rear-admiral (1836–1908)
- Oskar Ludvig Starck – vice-admiral (1846–1928)
- Oskar Wilhelm Enqvist – vice-admiral (1849–1912)
- Theodor Kristian Avellan – admiral, Minister of the Navy (1839–1916)
- Birger Ek – pilot and Mannerheim Cross Knight
- Axel Heinrichs – general (1890–1965)
- Gustav Hägglund, general (1938–)
- Jan Klenberg, admiral (1931–2020)
- Ruben Lagus – major general (1896–1956)
- Gustaf Erik Magnusson – father of Finnish fighter tactics
- Gustaf Mannerheim – marshal of Finland, president of Finland 1944–1946 (1867–1951)
- Lennart Oesch – lieutenant general (1892–1978)
- Harald Öhquist – lieutenant general (1891–1971)
- Hugo Österman – lieutenant general (1892–1975)
- Georg Magnus Sprengtporten – general (1740–1819)
- Torsten Stålhandske – commander of Hakkapelites (1594–1644)
- Kurt Martti Wallenius – lieutenant general (1893–1984)
- Hans Wind – pilot, twice awarded the Mannerheim Cross
- Erik Heinrichs - general (1890-1965)
- Woldemar Hägglund - lieutenant general (1893-1963)
- Hjalmar Siilasvuo - lieutenant general (1892-1947)

== Sportspeople ==
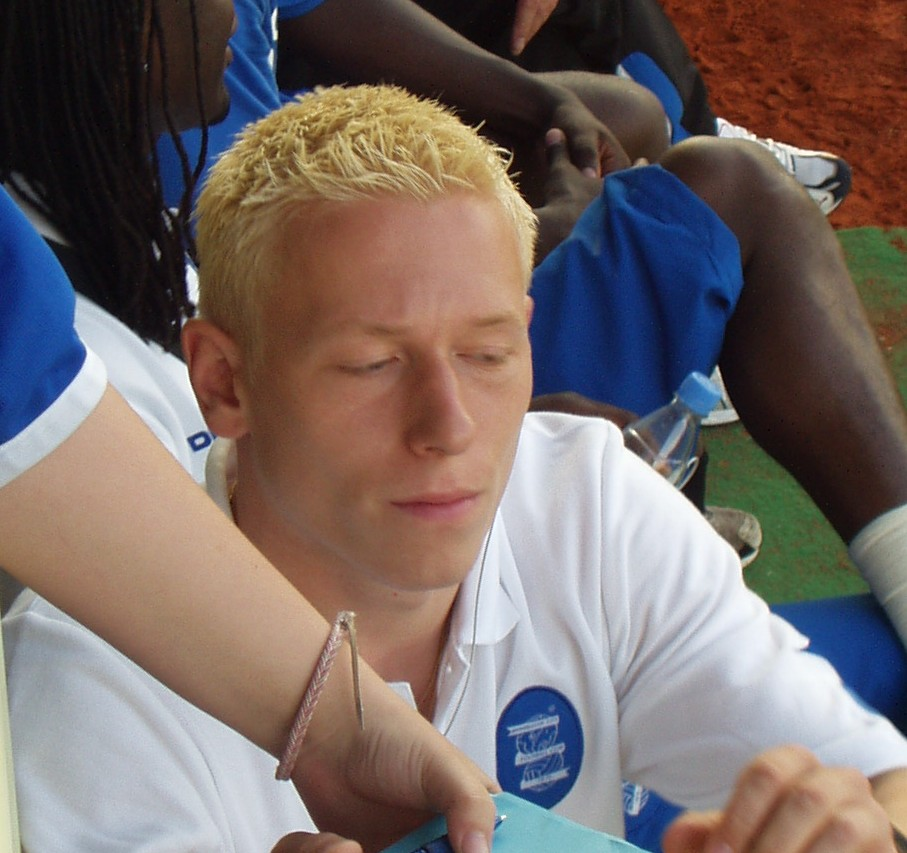
Mikael Forssell

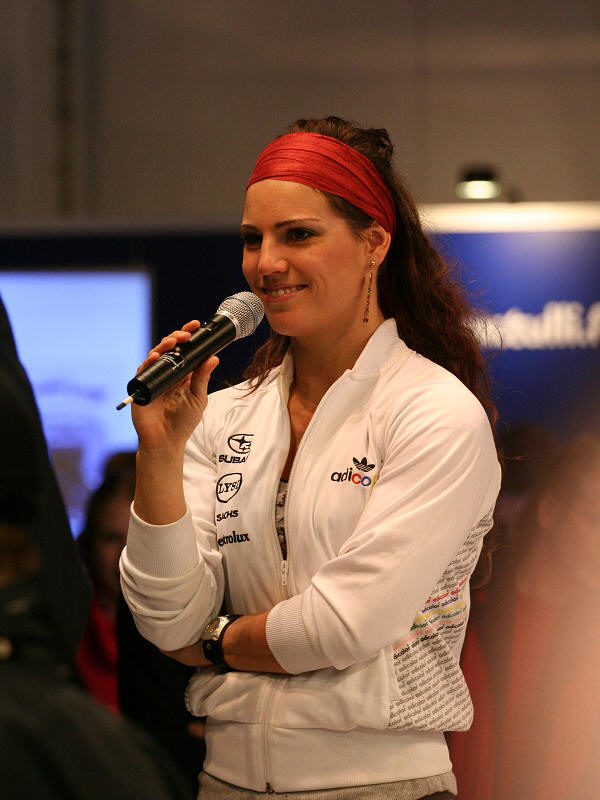
Eva Wahlstrom

- Mikael Almén – football player (2000– )
- Niklas Bäckström – ice hockey player (1978– )
- Sean Bergenheim – ice hockey player (1984– )
- Lucas Bergström - football player (2002- )
- Peter Enckelman – football player (1977– )
- Adelina Engman – football player (1994– )
- Alexei Eremenko – football player (1983– )
- Roman Eremenko – football player (1987– )
- Sergei Eremenko – football player (1999– )
- Marcus Forss – football player (1999– )
- Mikael Forssell – football player (1981– )
- Albin Granlund – football player (1989– )
- Marcus Grönholm – rally driver (1968– )
- Daniel Håkans - football player (2000- )
- Tony Halme (stage names Ludvig Borga, Viikinki) – MMA fighter, heavyweight boxer, sports entertainer and professional wrestler, and member of parliament (1963–2010)
- Kasper Hämäläinen – football player (1986– )
- Robert Helenius – boxer (1984– )
- Janne Holmén – marathon runner (1977– )
- Mikaela Ingberg – javelin thrower (1974– )
- Fredrik Jensen - football player (1997– )
- Richard Jensen - football player (1996- )
- Thomas Johanson – sailor; Olympic gold medalist (1969– )
- Jonatan Johansson – football player and coach (1975– )
- Benjamin Källman – football player (1998– )
- Kevin Lankinen - ice hockey player (1995- )
- Lucas Lingman – football player (1998– )
- Anton Lundell – ice hockey player (2001– )
- Joel Mattsson – football player (1999– )
- Matilda Nilsson – ice hockey player (1997– )
- Fredrik Norrena – ice hockey player (1973– )
- Oskar Osala – ice hockey player (1987– )
- Noah Pallas - football player (2001- )
- Mona-Lisa Pursiainen – sprinter (1951–2000)
- Alexander Ring – football player (1991– )
- Ronja Savolainen – ice hockey player; 2x Olympic bronze medalist (1997– )
- Rasmus Schüller – football player (1991– )
- Daniel Sjölund – football player (1983– )
- Simon Skrabb – football player (1995– )
- Toni Söderholm – ice hockey player (1978– )
- Tim Sparv – football player (1987– )
- Toni Ståhl – football player (1985– )
- Peter Tallberg – sailor (1937–2015)
- Eva Wahlström – boxer (1980– )
- Oscar Wiklöf - football player (2003- )

== Philosophers, theologians, and clergymen ==
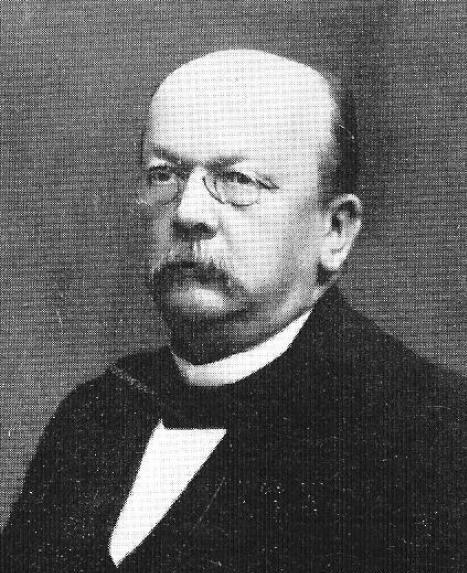
Lauri Ingman

- Fredrik Gabriel Hedberg
- Lauri Ingman
- Björn Vikström
- John Vikström
- Georg Henrik von Wright – philosopher; best known for work in the fields of analytic philosophy and philosophical logic and, later, morality and pessimism (1916–2003)

== Writers ==
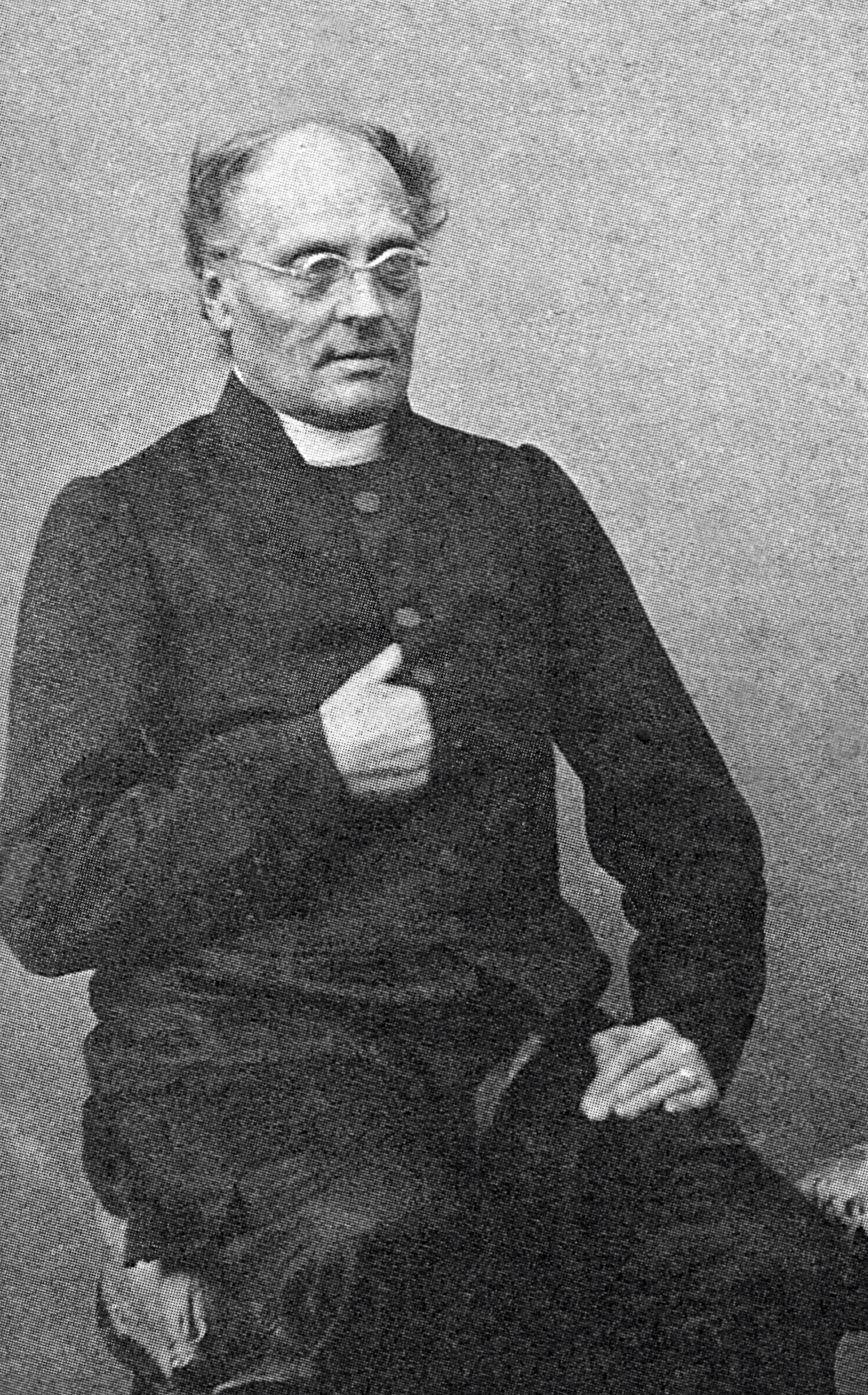
Johan Ludvig Runeberg

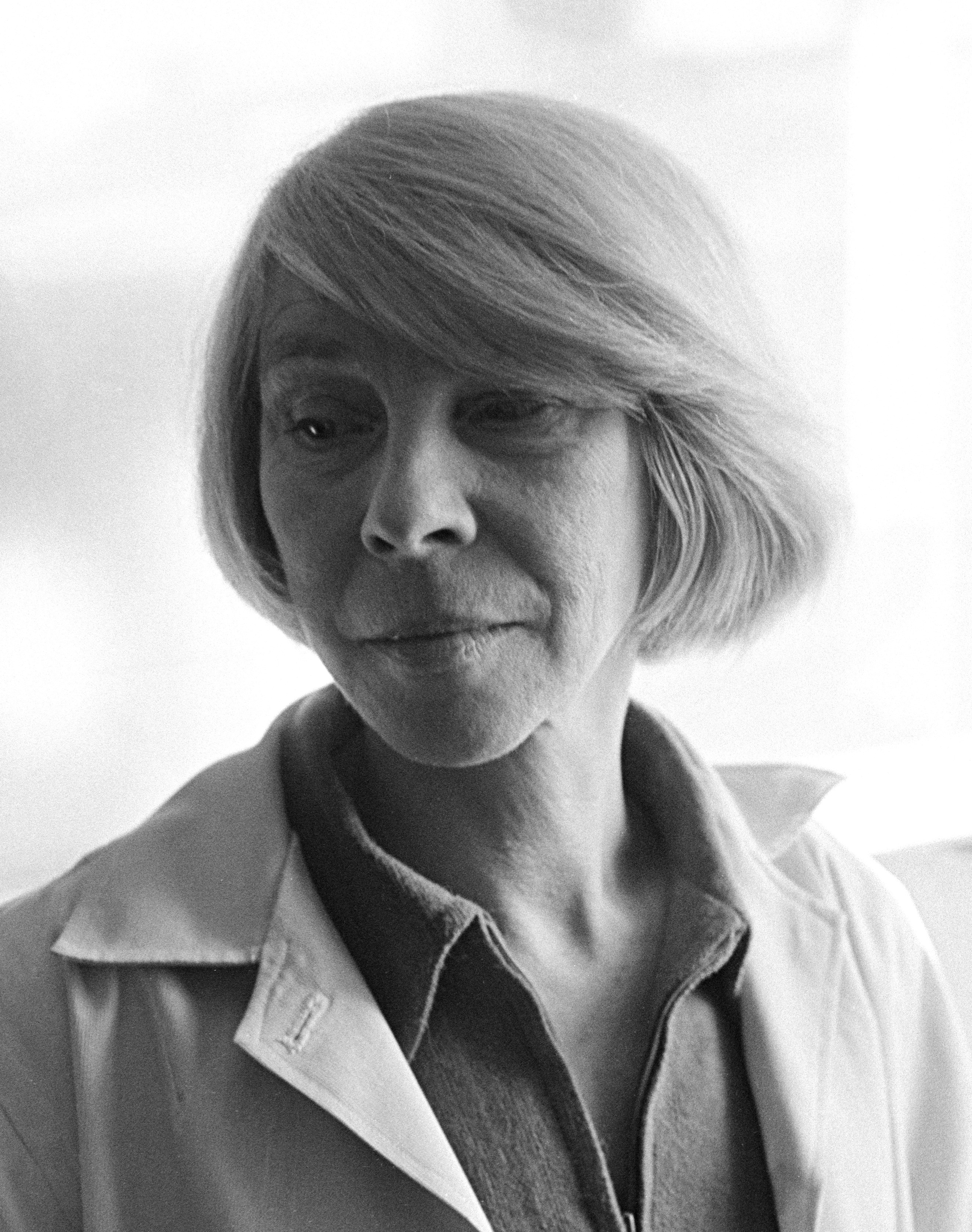
Tove Jansson

- Robert Alftan – author (1940–2022)
- Gunnar Björling – modernist poet (1887–1960)
- Bo Carpelan – poet and author (1926–2011)
- Fredrika Wilhelmina Carstens – author (1808–1888)
- Jörn Donner – author, journalist, critic, filmmaker, politician, and founder of Finnish Film Archive (1933–2020)
- Olly Donner – author and anthroposopher (1881–1956)
- Monika Fagerholm – novelist (1961– )
- Tua Forsström – poet (1947– )
- Boris Hurtta – science fiction writer (1945–2021)
- Bengt Idestam-Almquist (9 September 1895 – 16 September 1983) journalist and the "father of Swedish film criticism"
- Tove Jansson – author of the Moomin books (1914–2001)
- Irmelin Sandman Lilius – author (1936– )
- Fredrika Runeberg – journalist, novelist, and author of historical fiction (1807–1879)
- Johan Ludvig Runeberg – lyric and epic poet, considered the national poet of Finland; Lutheran priest (1804–1877)
- Johan Vilhelm Snellman – author, journalist, Fennoman philosopher, author, and member of the Senate of Finland (1806–1881)
- Wava Stürmer – author and songwriter (1929– )
- Edith Södergran – modernist poet (1892–1923)
- Marton Taiga – pulp fiction author (1907–1969)
- Henrik Tikkanen – author (1924–1984)
- Märta Tikkanen – author and literary scholar (1935– )
- Zacharias Topelius – author and historian (1818–1898)
- Nikke Torvalds – journalist (1945– )
- Ole Torvalds – journalist (1916–1995)
- Solveig von Schoultz – poet and author (1907–1996)
- Sara Wacklin – author and educator (1790–1846)
- Kjell Westö – author and journalist (1961– )

== Other notables ==
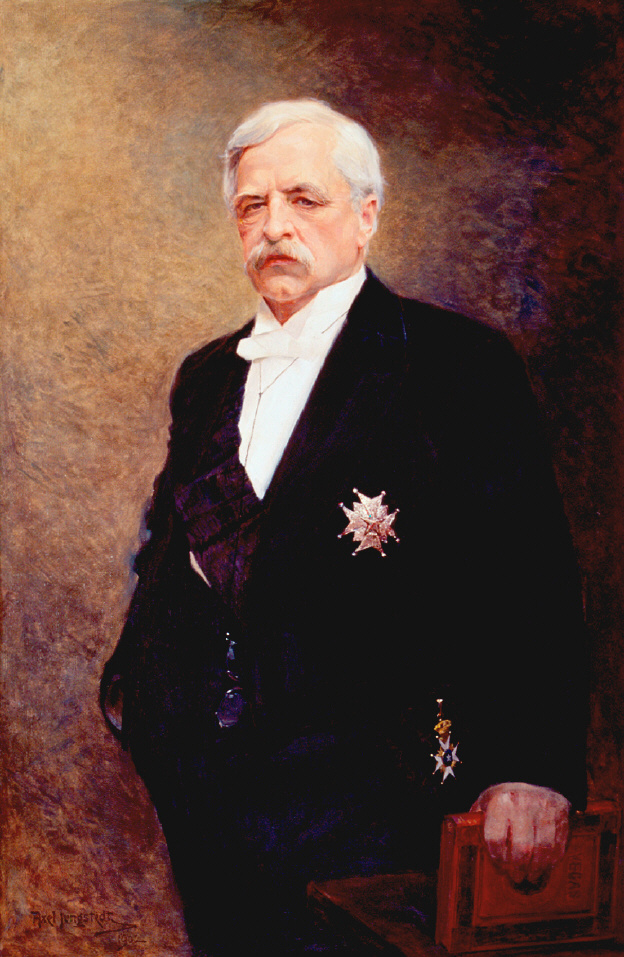
Adolf Erik Nordenskiöld

- Ior Bock – mythologist and eccentric (1942–2010)
- Sophie Mannerheim – nurse (1863–1928)
- Adolf Erik Nordenskiöld – explorer (1832–1901)
- Eugen Schauman – civilian who killed Nikolai Ivanovich Bobrikov (1875–1904)
- Thomas Wallgren – activist, politician, philosopher
- Folke West – traveller

=== Families ===
- Ahlström family
- Donner family
