= Rabbe Grönblom =

Finnish businessman (1950–2015)

Rabbe Anders Grönblom (3 May 1950 – 29 June 2015) was a Finnish businessman. He started a successful pizza business in Vaasa, Finland.

== Early life and career ==
Grönblom was born in Helsinki, and was a Swedish-speaking Finn. His first company—a pizzeria—was called O sole mio and it was founded in 1976 in the center of Vaasa. From there he expanded to a pizza franchise chain first called Pizzeria N:o 1. He was known as the "Pizza-emperor" (Pizzakeisari in Finnish), because he was the founder of a well known pizza franchise chain called Kotipizza which was the new name of Pizzeria N:o 1 which expanded fast outside of Vaasa. The chain is said to be the biggest one in the Nordic countries. He was also the founder of a shipping company called RG Line, a hotel chain called Omenahotelli and another pizza chain called Golden Rax Pizzabuffet. Most of his companies are subsidiaries of Grönblom International LTD, where Rabbe Grönblom acted as director. Golden Rax Pizzabuffet however is nowadays a part of Finland's largest hotel & restaurant company Restel Oy Ltd, where Rabbe Grönblom sat on the board. He was also on the board of the Finnish tyre company Nokian Renkaat (since 2003).
