= MS RG I =

Passenger ship

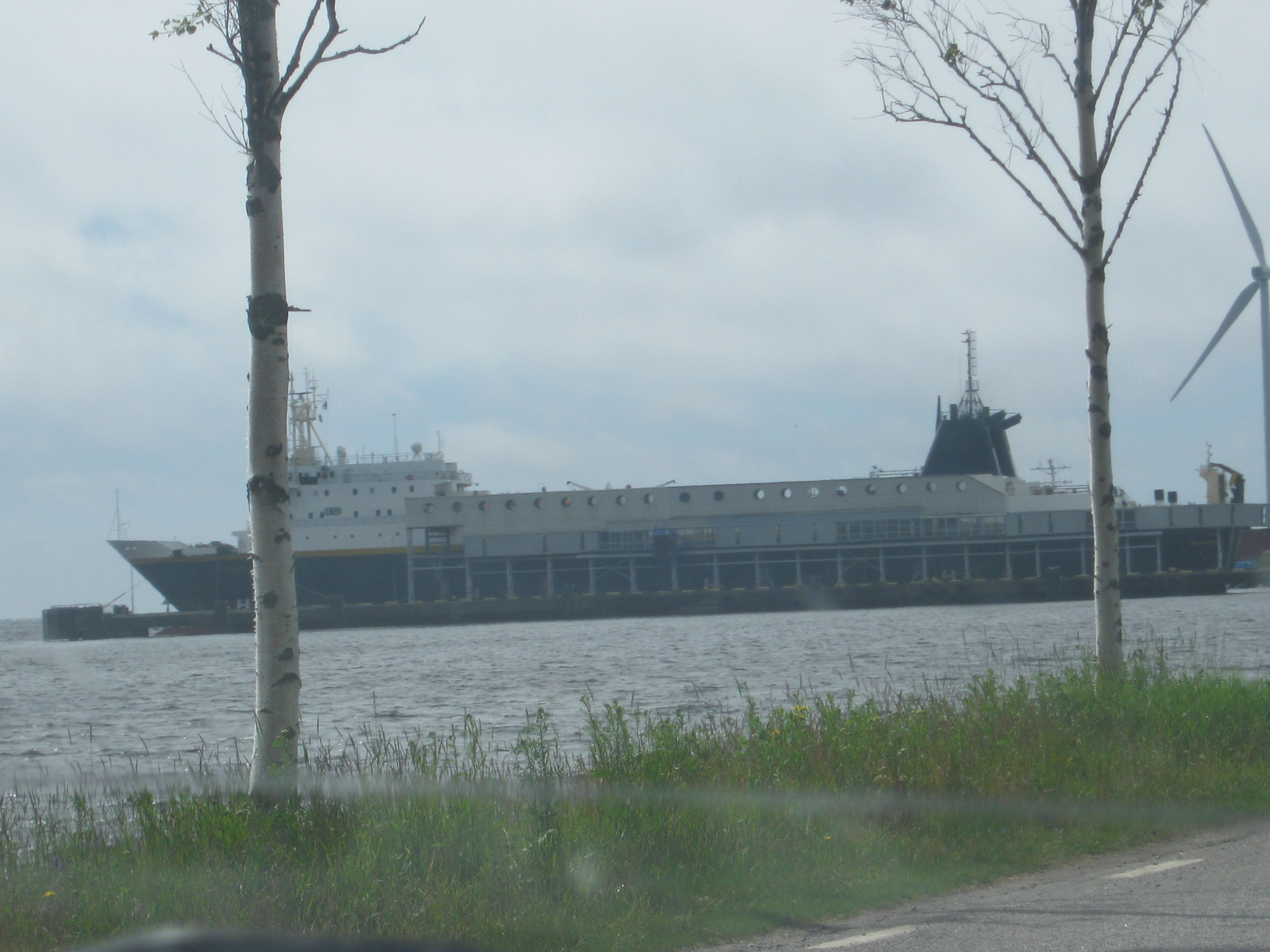
- MS RG I at Umeå harbour in July 2012.

History
- Name: RG I
- Owner: RG Line
- Port of registry: Finland
- Route: Vaasa, Finland - Umeå, Sweden
- Builder: VEB Mathias Thesen Werft, Wismar, East Germany
- Yard number: 152
- Launched: 1982
- Identification: IMO number: 8306577, MMSI number: 230969000
- Fate: Scrapped

General characteristics
- Type: Passenger/cargo ship
- Tonnage: 6,704 DWT
- Length: 140.12 m (459 ft 9 in)
- Beam: 20.5 m (67 ft 3 in)
- Installed power: 10,600 kW (14,200 hp)
- Propulsion: 2 × 12 cyl. Halberstadt S.K.L. Diesel
- Speed: 14.5 knots (26.9 km/h; 16.7 mph)
- Capacity: 840 lane meters

MS RG I (IMO 8306577) was a passenger/cargo ship which was last owned by the Finnish shipping company RG Line. The ship was a ro-ro ship. The ship was built in 1983 at the VEB Mathias Thesen Werft shipyard in Wismar, East Germany. The ship had a 6,704 tons deadweight (DWT). RG I was last registered in Finland and its homeport was in Vaasa. The ship travelled across the Kvarken between Vaasa, Finland and Umeå, Sweden up to 2012. The travel time was four hours and the ship used Finnish time. The ship carried 300 passengers.

RG I was sold to the Danish company Fornaes Shipbreaking in 2013.

Sister ships of MS RG I are MS Caribbean Carrier, MS Ile de Ire, MS Fast Independence and MS Lodbrog.

== Usage history ==
=== 1983-2003 ===
The ship was launched on 23 November 1982 and it was transferred to VEB Deutfracht/Seereederei GmbH on 31 October 1983, who registered it under the flag of East Germany. Its homeport was in Rostock. The ship was named Kahleberg at the time. On 18 June 1990 the ship was registered under Deutsche Seereederei GmbH under the flag of Germany. In August 1991 Kahleberg went to the Warnowwerft shipyard in Rostock, where the number of her cabins increased from 12 to 50. On 2 January 1992 the ship was moved to TT-Line GmbH's traffic between Trelleborg, Sweden and Rostock, Germany. On 1 January 1994 Kahleberg was registered under Euroseabridge Schiffahrtsgesellschaft. In February 1997 the ship moved under the flag of Liberia. Its homeport was in the nation's capital in Monrovia. After the change of flag the ship moved to traffic between Rostock and Liepāja, Latvia. On 13 May 1997 the ship moved to Euroseabridge's traffic between Travemünde, Germany and Liepāja, Latvia. In April 1999 the ship returned to traffic between Rostock and Liepāja. In February 2000 Kahleberg was moved to Amber Line's traffic between Liepāja and Karlshamn, Sweden. On 29 March 2003 the ship's loading company changed when the Polish company Polferries started using it to traffic between Świnoujście, Poland and Ystad, Sweden.

=== 2004-2013 ===
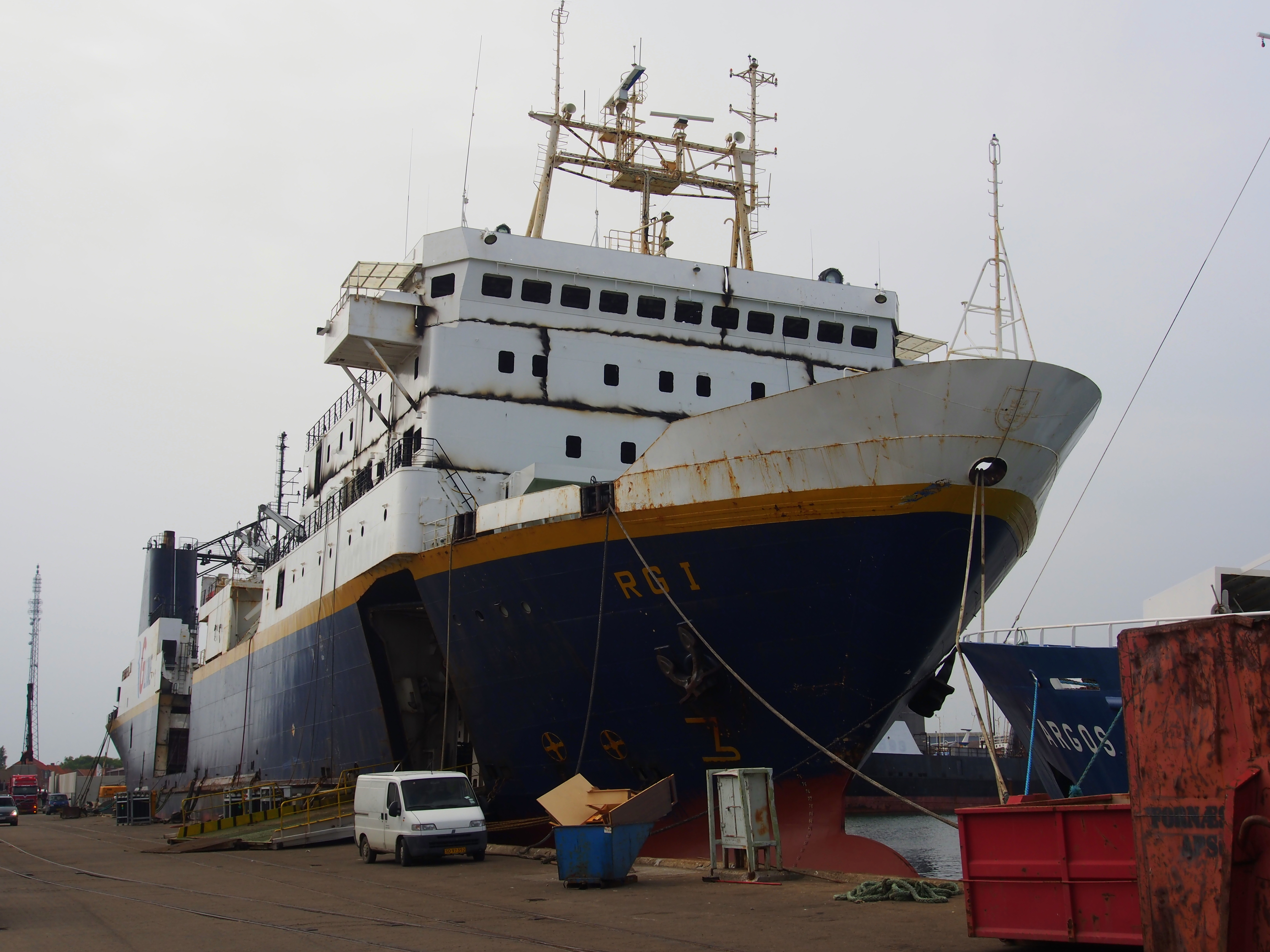
MS RG I at Grenå scrapyard in Denmark about to be scrapped.

On 23 November 2004 the Finnish shipping company RG Line bought the ship. On 29 December Kahleberg moved to Vaasa for repairs after discontinuing Polferries traffic a few days ago. On 18 January 2005 the ship was registered under the flag of Finland. Its new homeport was in Vaasa. After this the ship started traffic between Vaasa and Umeå. On 23 April the ship was rented for one voyage between Vaasa and Sundsvall, Sweden. From 30 June to 6 August Kahleberg made one voyage per week between Vaasa and Sundsvall.

On 1 July 2005 the ship was renamed MS RG I. In November the ship had technical problems for two times. The ship had technical problems again on 18 July 2006, which caused her departure from Vaasa to be cancelled. There were five cases of technical problems in December, causing the departures to be either postponed or cancelled. The ship had technical problems again on 6 February 2007, causing her to be late for several hours.

The ship was in traffic for the last time on 30 December 2012, after which she remained in Vaasa awaiting transfer. In February 2013 the ship was towed to Grenå, Denmark, and was scrapped in May.
