= Rock 'n Roll Children =

Studio album by Sturm und Drang
- Released: November 12, 2008
- Genre: Heavy metal, power metal
- Length: 41:07
- Label: (Finland) Helsinki Music Company (European Union) GUN
- Producer: Jimmy Westerlund; Co-Producers: André Linman, Patrick Linman, Mats Persson, Erik Mårtensson and Johan Becker

Sturm und Drang chronology
Learning to Rock (2007)	Rock 'n Roll Children (2008)

Singles from Rock 'n Roll Children
- 1. "Break Away" Released: 22 September 2008

Professional ratings
Review scores
Source	Rating
Imperiumi	7.50/10 stars

Rock 'n Roll Children is the second album by Finnish band Sturm und Drang. The album was released 12 November 2008 in Finland, and 16 January 2009 in other parts of Europe. Rock 'n Roll Children went straight to number two on the Finnish sales chart, and it was certified gold (15.000 records) within one week in Finland. The album was produced by Jimmy Westerlund, and co-produced by André Linman, Patrick Linman, Mats Persson, Erik Mårtensson and Johan Becker. Jani Liimatainen (Ex-Sonata Arctica, Cain's Offering) wrote the song "River Runs Dry".

The first single from the album, "Break Away", was released 22 September 2008.

Rock 'n Roll Children was released in Germany on 16 January 2009, with a different track listing.

== Track listing ==
1. "Last of the Heroes" (A.Linman/J.Becker/E.Mårtensson)
2. "River Runs Dry" (J.Liimatainen)
3. "Break Away" (A.Linman/J.Becker/E.Mårtensson)
4. "Sinner" (A.Linman/P.Linman/M.Persson)
5. "A Million Nights" (A.Linman/P.Linman/M.Persson)
6. "Alive" (A.Linman/J.Becker/E.Mårtensson)
7. "These Chains" (A.Linman/P.Linman/M.Persson)
8. "That's the Way I Am" (J.Becker/M.Sandén/M.Black)
9. "Life" (A.Linman/P.Linman/M.Persson)
10. "Heaven (Is Not Here)" (A.Linman/P.Linman/J.Becker/E.Mårtensson)

Bonus tracks:

11. "Fear of the Dark" released in Japan and Germany

=== German edition ===
The German release of the album featured a different track listing.

1. "The Last of the Heroes"
2. "River Runs Dry"
3. "Break Away"
4. "Photograph"
  - Only available on German version.
5. "A Million Nights"
6. "Alive"
7. "These Chains"
8. "That's the Way I Am"
9. "Life"
10. "Sinner"
11. "Fear of the Dark"

=== Bonus DVD ===
A special digipak version released in Germany featured a bonus DVD.

1. A Complete Sturm und Drang Documentary
2. Break Away (video)
3. A Million Nights (video)

== Personnel ==
- André Linman – vocals, guitars
- Alexander Ivars – guitars
- Henkka Kurkiala – bass guitar, backing vocals
- Calle Fahllund – drums
- Jeppe Welroos – keyboards
