= André Linman =

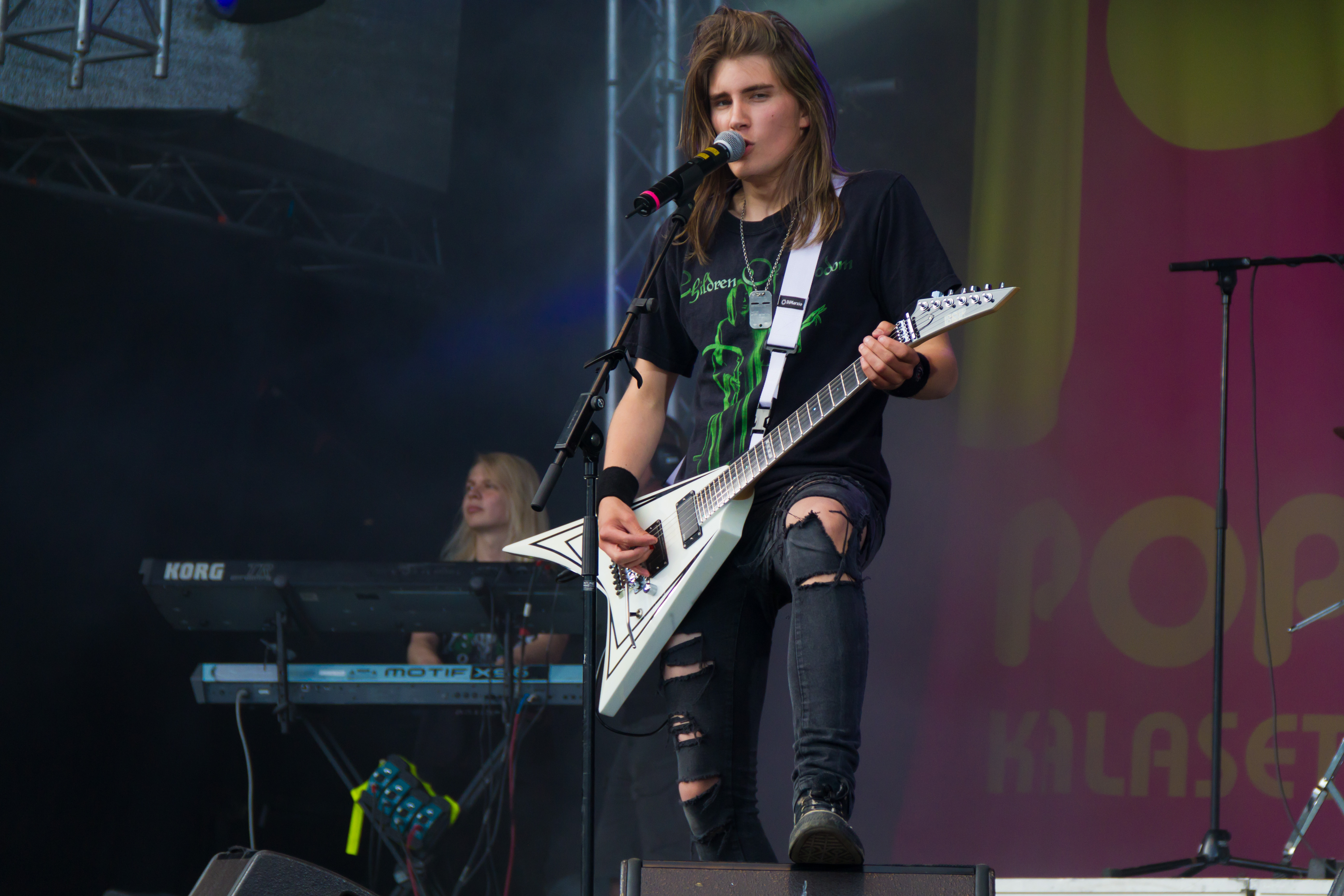
- André Linman (2011)

Background information
- Born: 28 February 1992 (age 33); Vaasa, Finland
- Genres: Heavy metal Hard rock Melodic rock
- Occupations: Musician, songwriter
- Instruments: Vocals, guitar
- Years active: 2004 – present
- Labels: HMC

André Linman (born 28 February 1992) is a founding member, lead singer and guitarist of the Finnish band Sturm und Drang. Sturm und Drang have been on hiatus since 2013. Linman is currently lead vocalist of One Desire. He started learning guitar and singing in 2004, the same year Sturm und Drang was formed.

His father is Patrick Linman, who is mostly recognized from the Finnish ESC. André usually writes the music for the songs with his father, and the lyrics by himself. Linman plays ESP Guitars and mostly he uses a variety of ESP SV guitars.

== Musical influences ==
Linman is mainly self-taught and his main influences in guitar playing comes from Judas Priest's guitarist Glenn Tipton. He also admires bands like Sonata Arctica, Iron Maiden, Dio and other heavy metal artists. Linman is also a self-taught vocalist and when Sturm und Drang started in 2004 he had never sung before.

== One Desire ==
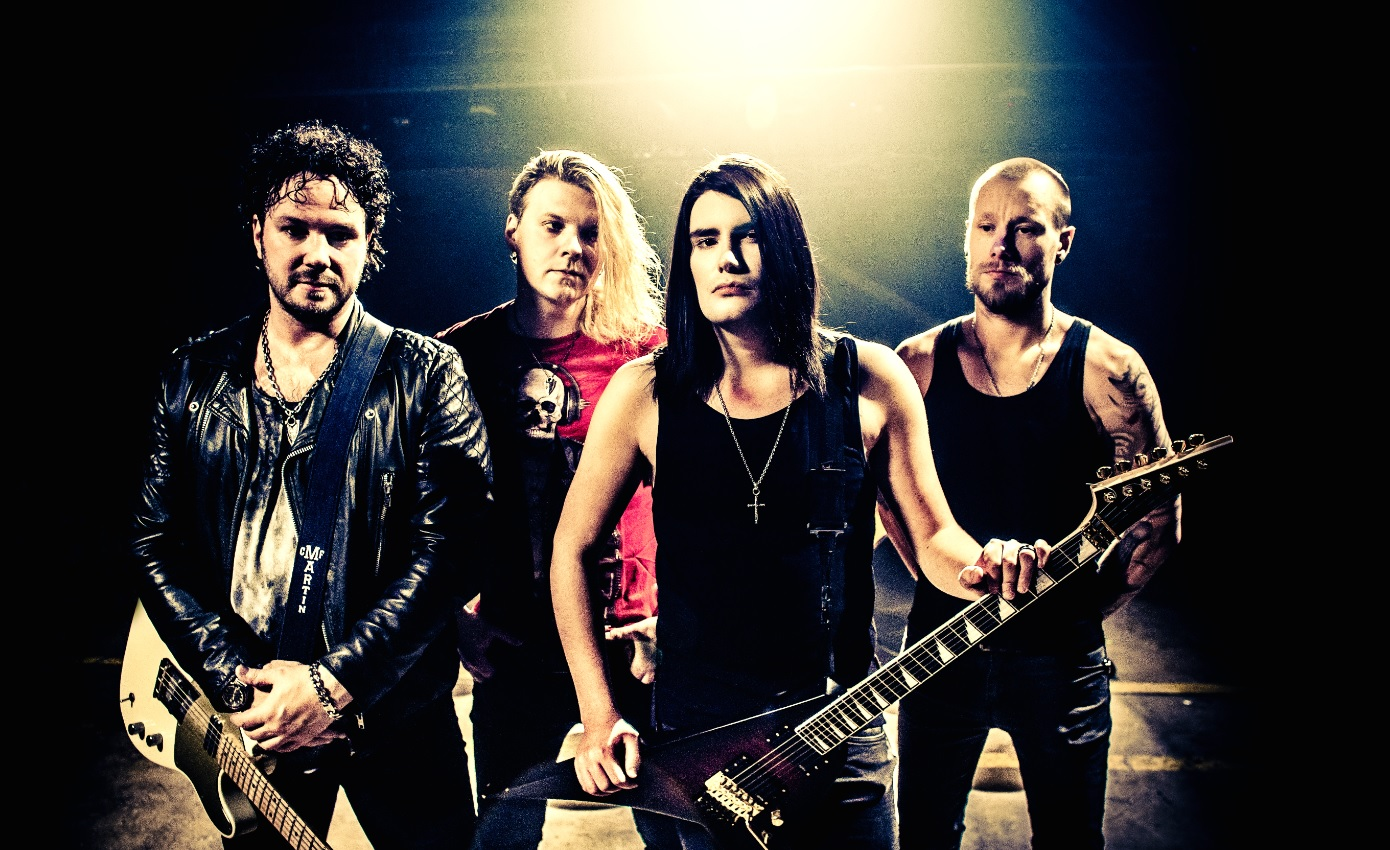
One Desire 2017 promotional image

Linman is currently lead vocalist for One Desire, their self-titled debut album released on 24 March 2017 on Frontiers Records. He was recruited to join the band in 2013. Of the band, Linman says "Musically, the band draws influences from classic rock bands like Journey, Toto, and Def Leppard, but also lots of heavier, more modern bands. Our sound is very melodic, slightly pop-ish at times, but still based on a heavy rock sound." Other members of One Desire are Jonas Kuhlberg (bass guitar), Jimmy Westerlund (guitars) and Ossi Sivula (drums).

To promote their self-titled debut album, One Desire appeared on day 1 of the Frontiers Rock Festival IV held in Trezzo (Milano), Italy, 29-30 March 2017. Following this, a 15-date tour commencing in Finland on 13 April and concluding in Germany on 6 May was scheduled.

== Discography ==
With Sturm und Drang

- Learning To Rock (2007)
- Rock 'n Roll Children (2009)
- Graduation Day (2012)

With One Desire

- One Desire (2017) [album released 24 March 2017]
- Hurt (2017) (first single taken from One Desire)
- Whenever I'm Dreaming (2017) (second single taken from One Desire)
- Apologize (2017) (third single taken from One Desire)
- Midnight Empire (2020) [album released 22 May 2020]
- After You're Gone (2020) (first single taken from Midnight Empire)
- Shadowman (2020) (second single taken from Midnight Empire)
