= Sturm und Drang (band) =

Finnish rock band

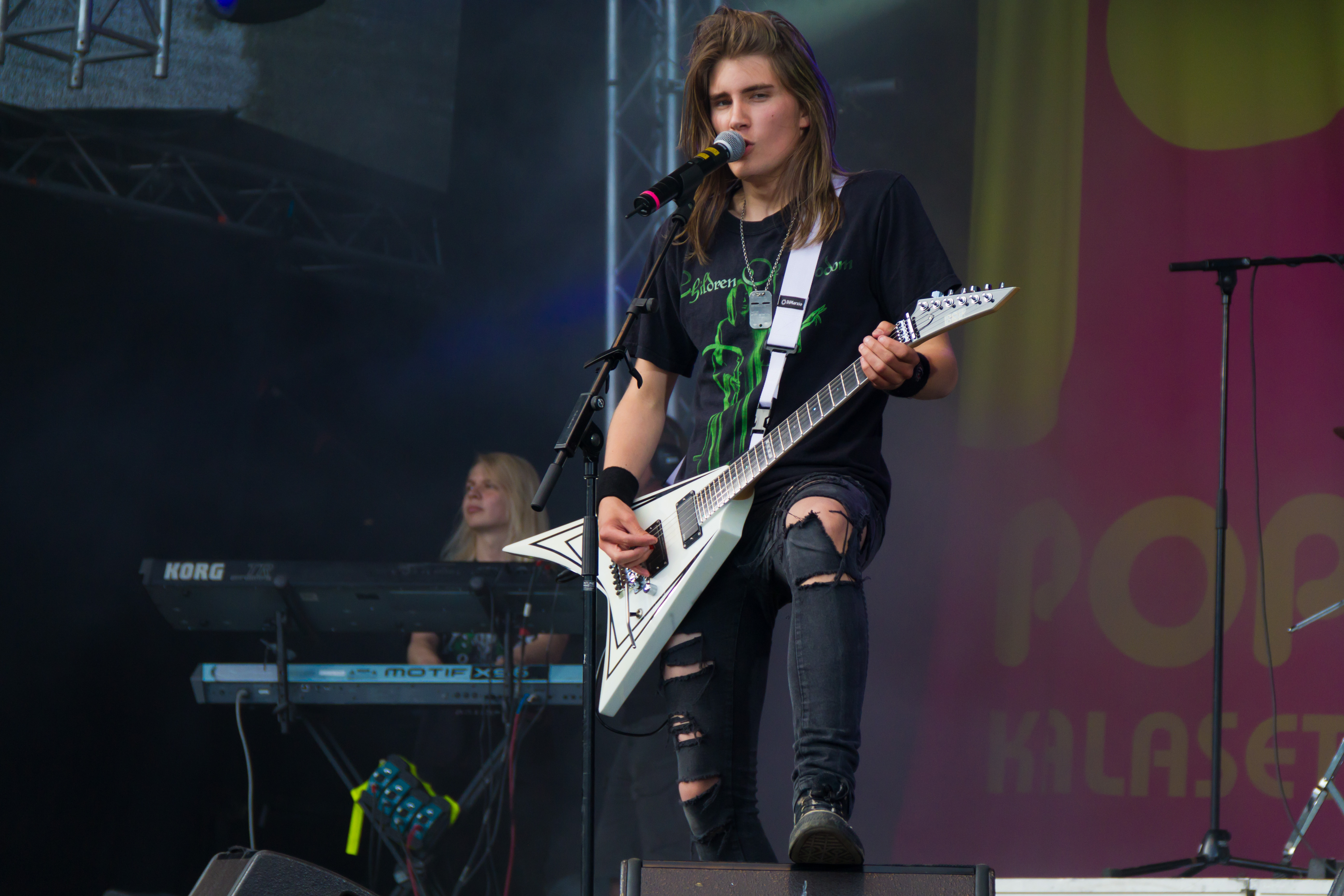

Background information
- Origin: Vaasa, Finland
- Genres: Heavy metal, hard rock, power metal
- Years active: 2004–2014
- Labels: Warner Music/HMC, Sony BMG, BMG Japan
- Past members: André Linman; Jesper Welroos; Calle Fahllund; Henrik Kurkiala; Alexander Ivars; Jani Kuoppamaa; Joel Wendlin

Sturm und Drang was a Finnish heavy metal/hard rock band from Vaasa formed in 2004. The band's original members were lead singer/guitarist André Linman, guitarist/backing vocals Alexander Ivars, keyboardist Jesper Welroos, bassist/backing vocalist Henrik Kurkiala and drummer/backing vocalist Calle Fahllund. Other members were bassist Joel Wendlin (joined 2010) and guitarist Jani Kuoppamaa (joined 2011). The band started off as schoolmates covering bands such as Judas Priest and gradually started writing their own material. They were discovered in 2005 by record label HMC. Their debut album Learning to Rock was released in 2007 and eventually went platinum in Finland. Their second album Rock 'n Roll Children was released in 2008 and went gold within less than a week. The band is known for songs "Rising Son", "Indian" and "A Million Nights". As of 2010, the band has sold over 100,000 records. In 2014, the band broke up when members left to start their own separated projects.

== History ==
The band started in 2004 when André Linman and Henrik Kurkiala were on their way home from a Judas Priest concert. Sturm und Drang (storm and stress in German) was a proto-Romantic movement in German literature and music that occurred between the late 1760s and early 1780s. Shortly afterwards, Jesper Welroos and Calle Fahllund joined the band. A few weeks later, they performed in their first concert. Later, they realized that they needed one more guitar player, and Alexander Ivars became their fifth member. The band played at Stafettkarnevalen 2004 in Vaasa, also making a cover of Dio's Rainbow In The Dark.

In 2007, they already played as the headline on Stafettkarnevalen.

André, Jesper, Calle, Alexander and Henrik belong to the minority of Swedish-speaking Finns. When their first album was published in 2007, the boys were only 15–16 years old.

In February 2010, bassist Henrik Kurkiala left Sturm und Drang. The new bassist is called Joel Wendlin. As of 2011, Alexander Ivars has also left the band. His replacement is Jani Kuoppamaa, who had previously stepped in for Ivars when he had been unable to attend.

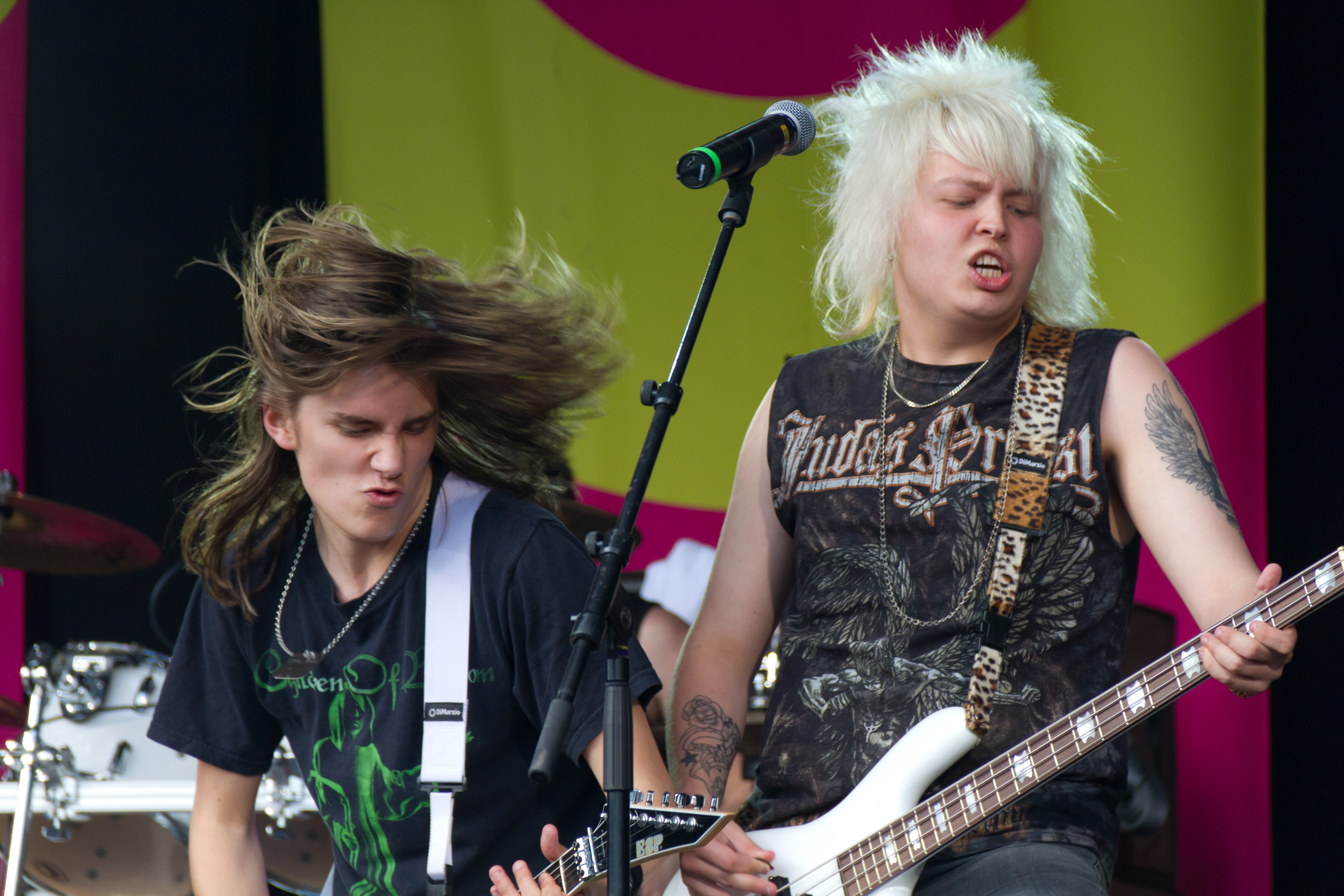
Sturm und Drang performing in 2011

In April 2011, the band had recorded two tracks for their upcoming third album. In March 2012, the album was ready for release in the Nordic countries, Central Europe and Japan without mixing. In total, the band made 30 songs, 10 of which were released on the album. On 21 September 2012, the band released a new album called Graduation Day. Its first single is called "Molly the Murderer". The music video for the song has been directed by Marko Mäkilaakso. The second single on the album, Goddamn Liar, was released in September 2012.

The band was made into a documentary called Like a rockstar in 2014. The documentary was produced by Pampas Produktion AB. The band quit in 2014 when its members began to have other plans.

In March 2019, it was announced that the band's original members André Linman and Jeppe Welroos would do a duet tour together called "An Evening With Sturm und Drang featuring André Linman & Jeppe Welroos".

== Influences ==
Sturm und Drang's biggest influence is Patrick Linman, the father of singer André Linman, who has previously played in the barracks band Not Yet and later in the light music band Place-2-Go. Patrick wrote all the songs with André, and also served as the band's manager. Members of Sturm und Drang have described Kiss, Iron Maiden, Dio, and Judas Priest as musical influences.

== Record deal ==
In 2005, Sturm und Drang recorded the demo Rising Son which they sent to Helsinki Music Company. The boss for HMC, Asko Kallonen, who had not taken them seriously, changed opinion after hearing them play live with the Swedish garage rock band The Hellacopters. He gave the band their record deal, and shortly afterwards they started to record their first album, Learning to Rock. In 2007, they also got a new record company, GUN Records, which would release their debut album in the whole of Europe except for Scandinavia.

After the 30 May release of their album in Finland, Learning to Rock climbed to number three on the official chart of record sales in Finland.^{1}

== Members ==
=== Final lineup ===
- André Linman – lead vocals, guitars (2004–2014)
- Calle Fahllund – drums, backing vocals (2004–2014)
- Jesper Welroos – keyboards (2004–2014)
- Joel Wendlin – bass, backing vocals (2010–2014)
- Jani Kuoppamaa – guitars (2011–2014)

=== Former members ===
- Henrik Kurkiala – bass, backing vocals (2004–2010)
- Alexander Ivars – guitars, backing vocals (2004–2011)

== Discography ==
=== Albums ===
Year	Information	Chart positions				Sales
Year	Information	GER	AUT	SWI	POL	Sales
2007	Learning to Rock: Debut studio album; Released: 30 May 2007 (Finland), 2 June 2007 (Northern Europe)					
2008	Rock 'n Roll Children: Released: 12 November 2008	83				
2012	Graduation Day: Released: 21 September 2012					

=== Singles ===
Year	Title	Album
2007	"Rising Son"	Learning to Rock
2007	"Forever"	Learning to Rock
2007	"Indian"	Learning to Rock
2007	"Broken"	Learning to Rock
2008	"Break Away"	Rock 'n Roll Children
2008	"A Million Nights"	Rock 'n Roll Children
2009	"That's the Way I Am"	Rock 'n Roll Children
2012	"Molly the Murderer"	Graduation Day
2012	"Goddamn Liar"	Graduation Day
