= Restel =

Finnish restaurant company

- Owner: Tradeka-Yhtiöt Oy
- Subsidiaries: Restel Fast Food Oy; Restel Casual Oy; Restel Ravintolat Oy; Restel Mexican Food Oy; Restel Fresh Food Oy

Restel Oy is a Finnish restaurant company belonging to Tradeka Group.

Until summer 2017, the Restel Group owned a total of 47 hotels and over 230 restaurants across Finland, making it the largest in its field in the country. Annual turnover in 2020 was just over 178 million euros. Restel employs approximately 2,000 people annually.

In June 2017, Restel sold its entire hotel business to the Swedish Scandic and said it would focus on its restaurant operations. The Finnish Competition and Consumer Authority approved the acquisition in December 2017.

In 2019, Restel Ravintolat Oy was the fifth largest catering company in Finland with a turnover of 73.6 million euros, after Compass Group, Sodexo, Finnair Kitchen and Leijona Catering. Restel Fast Food Oy was the seventh largest with 63.2 million euros. Restel Oy's other subsidiaries are Restel Fast Food Oy, Restel Casual Oy, Restel Mexican Food Oy and Restel Fresh Food Oy.

The name Restel comes from the words for restaurant and hotel.

== History ==
Restel's roots lie in the hotel and restaurant operations of Tradeka's predecessor companies. When Eka Group was established as a result of a merger in 1983, it took over the hotels and restaurants of 39 cooperatives.

The business name Restel was adopted in 1989, and Restel became a separate company the following year.

The chain included one of Finland's oldest restaurants, Foija, which operated in Turku from the 1830s until 2019. In 2022, Restel acquired the Hanko Makaronitehdas and Classic Pizza restaurant chains, which included a total of 23 restaurants. They employed a total of 150 employees in 12 locations and their turnover in 2019 before the corona pandemic was approximately 15 million euros.

== Restaurants ==
=== Restaurant chains ===
- Burger King
- Rax Buffet
- Taco Bell
- Classic Pizza
- O'Learys
- Makaronitehdas
- Wanha Mestari
- Martina
- Food & Events -tapahtumaravintolat (mm. Kansallisooppera, Metro Areena ja messu- ja tapahtumakeskus Paviljonki)

=== Other restaurants ===
- Ravintola Central, Helsinki
- Kaarle XII, Helsinki
- Ravintola Mestaritalli, Helsinki
- Meritalli, Helsinki
- Muikkuravintola Sampo, Kuopio
- Bastion Bistro (Suomenlinna), Helsinki
- Ravintola Keisarinsatama, Kotka
- Kahvila Hyrylä, Tuusula
- Ravintola Lastu, Lahti
- RAITO Sushi, Helsinki

=== Order restaurants ===
- Tekniska, Helsinki
- Piano Paviljonki, Helsinki
- Koiviston Huvila, Espoo

== Hotels owned ==
(abandoned in June 2017)

- Cumulus
- Holiday Inn (Offices in Finland)
- Crowne Plaza Helsinki
- Hotelli Seurahuone Helsinki
- Hotel Indigo Helsinki - Boulevard
