= Kotipizza =

Finnish pizza restaurant chain

Kotipizza Oyj

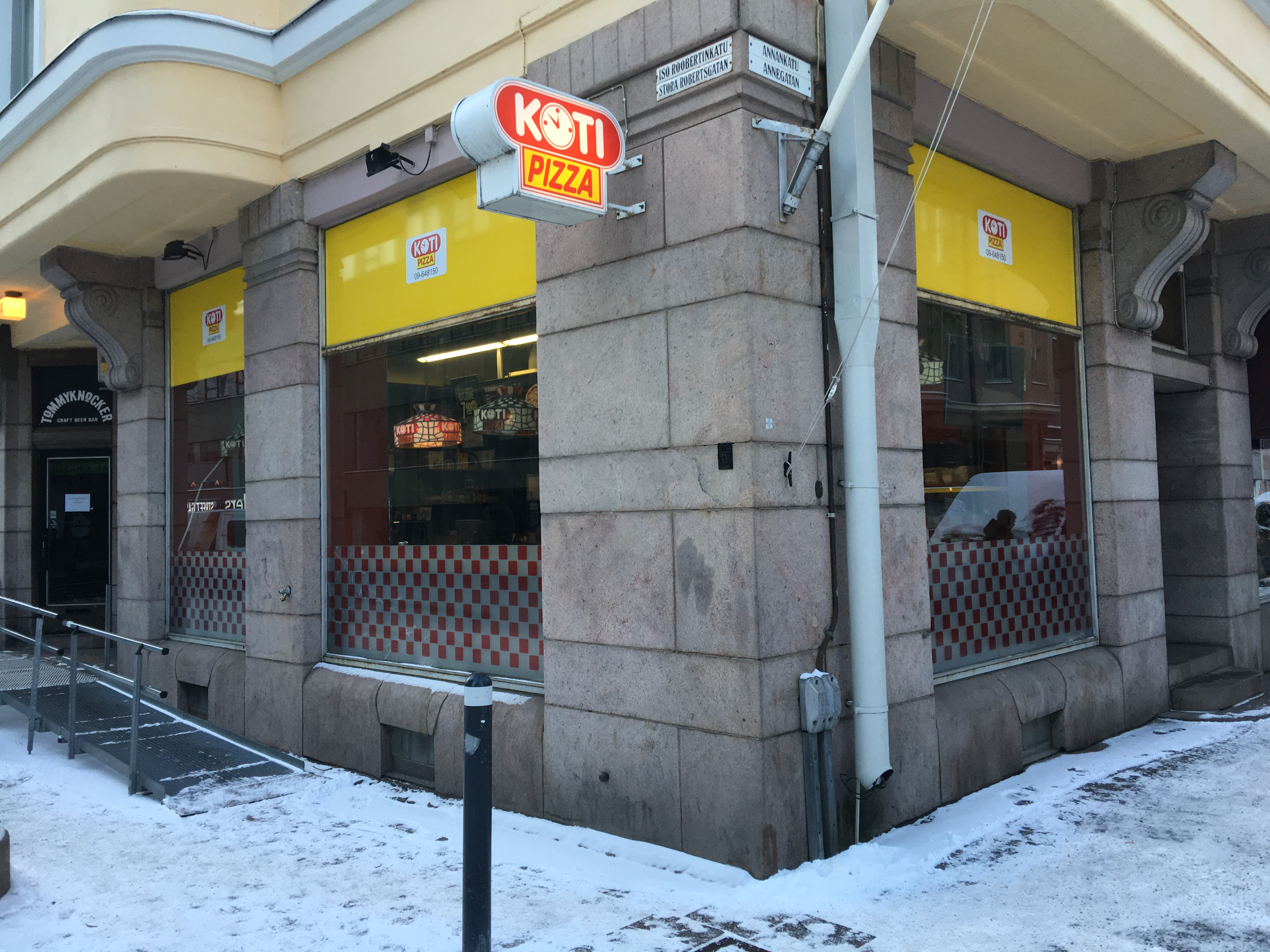
- A Kotipizza restaurant in Helsinki.
- Trade name: Nasdaq Helsinki: PIZZA
- Company type: Julkinen osakeyhtiö
- Industry: Pizza restaurant chain
- Founded: 1987; 39 years ago
- Founder: Rabbe Grönblom
- Headquarters: Helsinki, Finland
- Number of locations: 290+ (2025)
- Key people: Tommi Tervanen (CEO)
- Products: Pizza
- Revenue: ▲EUR 15,100,000 (2010)
- Owner: Frankis Finland Oy (100%)
- Website: www.kotipizza.fi

Kotipizza Oyj is a Finnish pizza restaurant chain headquartered in Helsinki. With over 290 locations, it is the largest chain of pizza restaurants in the Nordic countries.

Kotipizza was founded in 1987 by Rabbe Grönblom in Vaasa, Finland. By the end of 2010, the Kotipizza chain constituted some 281 restaurants in over 130 municipalities. Some Kotipizza restaurants are located in conjunction with gas stations. The most northern Kotipizza restaurant in Finland is located in Karigasniemi in the municipality of Utsjoki.

The overall revenue of the Kotipizza restaurant chain in 2012 was 72 million euro. Over 95% of the Kotipizza restaurants in Finland are operated by franchising. In addition to Finland, Kotipizza restaurants are found in Saint Petersburg, Estonia and in China in Suzhou, near Shanghai.

Kotipizza has been chosen as the best franchising chain of the year in 1992 and 2009. Kotipizza's motto is "Pizza, Love & Understanding". Koti is Finnish and translates to "home". Some restaurants offer delivery and accept orders by phone or via the internet.

== Poro/Berlusconi ==
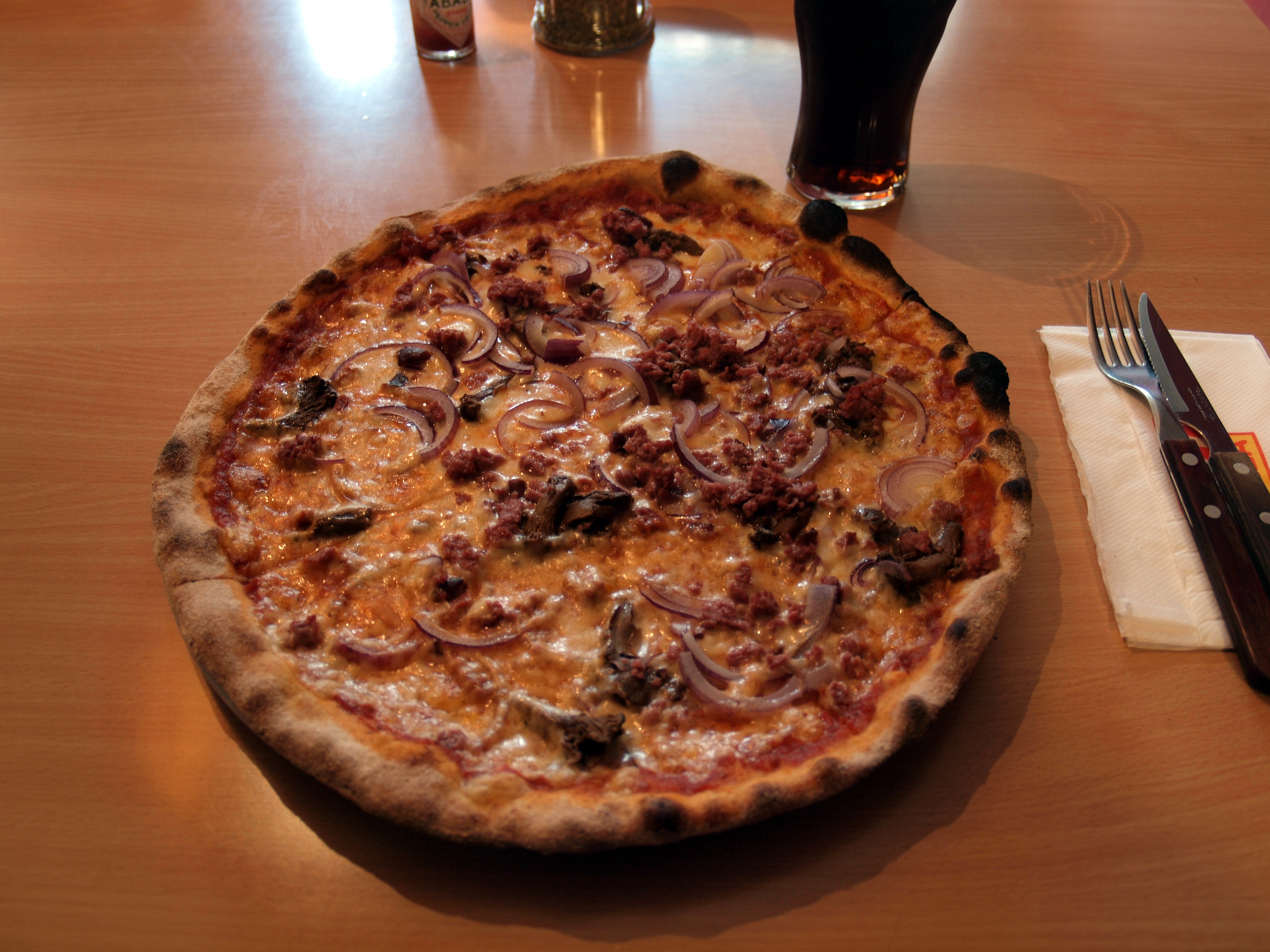
Pizza Berlusconi

"Poro," formerly known as the "Berlusconi", is Kotipizza's product name for a pizza with smoked reindeer, tomato sauce, cheese, chanterelle mushrooms and red onion.

It was named "Pizza Berlusconi" in mid-2008 after Italian Prime Minister Silvio Berlusconi. Berlusconi had caused a minor diplomatic incident in 2005, when he said that he had to "endure" Finnish cuisine, and joked disparagingly about Finns eating "marinated reindeer". Although marinated reindeer is a common dish in Lapland, in the rest of Finland the meat is traditionally stewed or dried.

With Pizza Berlusconi, Kotipizza won the America's Plate International pizza contest in New York City in March 2008, beating the Italian-Americans, who came in second place, and the Australians in third.

== See also ==
- List of pizza franchises
