= RG Line =

Finnish shipping company

RG Line Oy Ab
- Industry: Passenger transportation Freight transportation
- Founded: 2001
- Headquarters: Vaasa, Finland
- Area served: Gulf of Bothnia
- Key people: Rabbe Grönblom
- Website: www.rgline.com

RG Line Oy Ab was a Finnish shipping company founded in 2001 that operated a ferry line between Vaasa, Finland and Umeå, Sweden until the end of 2012. Nowadays the Vaasa-Umeå line is operated by Wasa Line.

The company was founded in 2001 by well known Vaasa-based businessman Rabbe Grönblom, just months after Silja Line had put their traffic on Kvarken / Merenkurkku to an end because of a decision in the EU to stop taxfree sales on travels between member states. RG Line bought Silja's M/S Fennia and renamed her to M/S Casino Express, the ship was put in traffic on the route Vaasa–Umeå on 16 May 2001. At first RG Line profiled the ship as a ship where you could have fun and party, much like the ferries who trafficked Kvarken in the tax-free times. However, it did not become a success; people did not want to cruise any more. The blackjack and roulette tables they had added to get a casino feeling were removed before a year had passed. The company focused on ordinary travellers and cargo instead. The route over Kvarken was supported financially by the city of Vaasa. The city of Umeå or the county of Västerbotten do not support international connections because of a policy. The county of Västerbotten is responsible for local bus transport, but they don't have a bus line to the Umeå port, the nearest is 1.5 kilometres (1 mi) away.

The company filed for bankruptcy on 29 November 2011, and the operations are suspended. Despite the bankruptcy, the company is continuing operations until October 2012.

== History 2004–2005 ==
On 23 November 2004 RG Line announced that they had bought the ship M/S Kahleberg, which has more capacity for cargo and takes less passengers than Casino Express, which it will replace. It is said that Kahleberg will be put into traffic between Vaasa and Umeå in May 2005.

On 24 November, one day after RG Line informed the public about the purchase of their new ship Kahleberg, bad luck struck the company. Casino Express, with 39 passengers and 27 crew members on board, ran aground just outside the harbour of Holmsund near Umeå. At the time of the accident, there were strong south-western winds up to 25–30 metres per second (90–108 km/h; 56–67 mph). Casino Express got some serious damages that had to be repaired; six days after the grounding the ship was pulled from the reef and then towed to a repair shipyard in Estonia.

On 26 November, RG Line announced that they had chartered M/S Alandia from Eckerö Linjen to temporarily sail for the company while Casino Express was being repaired in Estonia. Alandia is a well-known ship for people in the Kvarken region, as she had been trafficking for Vasabåtarna for thirteen years as Botnia Express before she was sold to Eckerö Linjen.

Alandia, which at the time of Casino Express' accident was laid up in Eckerö, was sent to a repair shipyard in Stockholm to fix a broken propeller. After that she would immediately take up the traffic for RG Line. She arrived at Holmsund on 9 December, where she loaded cargo, food et cetera that had been on Casino Express. Alandia took off to Vaasa that evening; she would make her first regular trip from there the morning after. But the ship did not get far; she ran aground on the same place as Casino Express did just weeks earlier. Alandia suffered some damages and could not continue to Vaasa; she was instead sent off to a repair shipyard in Mariehamn and RG Line was once again without a ship.

RG Line's new ship Kahleberg arrived to Vaasa in the last days of January 2005. The plan was to rebuild the ship and not put it into traffic until in May. Alandia was still being repaired, RG Line did not want to wait for her to get back. Instead they decided to put the unrenovated Kahleberg into traffic on January 21. On her first trip to Umeå she had a motor breakdown about 10 minutes out of Vaasa and had to set anchor; she eventually made it to Umeå but delayed. Kahleberg was classed to take no more than 75 passengers; RG Line intended to reclass her after having renovated her. The local newspapers criticized RG Line for putting a ship with such low passenger capacity and low comfort into traffic. For the school's winter holidays, when travelling between Sweden and Finland rises, RG Line had to charter the now repaired Alandia, which have a higher passenger capacity. She was in traffic between Umeå and Vaasa between 26 February and March 9 instead of Kahleberg.

On April 23, Kahleberg was chartered to deliver cargo to Sundsvall. At the same time RG Line announced that, starting that summer, they would make one trip a week to Sundsvall.

On May 1, Casino Express returned from the Estonian shipyard and was put back in traffic on her old route. The renovation of Kahleberg could now finally begin.

== Route ==
RG Line operated one route across the Gulf of Bothnia. The 53-nautical-mile (98 km; 61 mi) crossing between Vaasa and Umeå (Holmsund) took 4 hours and 30 minutes.

== Fleet ==
RG Line operated one vessel.

Name	Built	Enterered service	Tonnage
RG I	1983	2005	10,271 GT
