= Learning to Rock =

Studio album by Sturm und Drang
- Released: May 30, 2007
- Recorded: 2006/07
- Genre: Hard rock
- Length: 38:36
- Label: HMC Finland, GUN
- Producer: Jimmy Westerlund, A.Linman, P.Linman, M.Persson

Sturm und Drang chronology
Learning to Rock (2007)	Rock 'n Roll Children (2008)

Professional ratings
Review scores
Source	Rating
Imperiumi	6.25/10 stars

Learning to Rock is the debut album by the Finnish band Sturm und Drang. It spawned "Rising Son" and "Forever" (only radio promo single) as its first two singles. The band members were only 15 and 16 years old when the album was released. The album was released in Germany, Austria and Switzerland on August 24, 2007, and the versions released there had different cover and different track lists. One version was the same in Finland, but their German label GUN Records released an Amazon special version which included a cover of Judas Priests "Breaking the Law", the video for "Rising Son" and an EPK interview. They also recorded a new version of "Forever", featuring Udo Dirkschneider on backing vocals.

== Track listing ==
1. "Broken" (A.Linman/P.Linman)
2. "Talking to Silence" (A.Linman/P.Linman/M.Persson)
3. "Forever" (A.Linman/P.Linman/M.Persson)
4. "Rising Son" (A.Linman/P.Linman/M.Persson)
5. "The Raven" (A.Linman/P.Linman)
6. "Indian" (A.Linman/P.Linman)
7. "Learning to Rock" (A.Linman/P.Linman/M.Persson)
8. "Fly Away" (A.Linman/P.Linman/M.Persson)
9. "Mortals" (P.Linman/A.Linman/Caleb/J.Nikula)
10. "Miseria" (A.Linman/P.Linman/M.Persson)

== Special editions ==
The German record company GUN Records released two versions in Germany, Switzerland and Austria (GSA). One contain the same tracks as the Finnish one and the Rising Son video, and one Amazon special edition. The Finnish record company HMC will release a new version entitled: "Learning To Rock: International version´, which contain bonus tracks

German Amazon special edition Bonus-tacks:

1. Breaking the Law (Judas Priest cover)
2. Rising Son (video)
3. EPK Interview (video)

International edition Bonus-tracks

1. Forever (feat. Udo Dirkschneider)
2. Breaking the Law (Judas Priest cover)
3. Rising Son (video)
4. Indian (video)

Japanese edition Bonus-tracks

1. Forever (feat. Udo Dirkschneider)
2. Breaking the Law (Judas Priest cover)
3. Rising Son (acoustic version)
4. Rising Son (video)
5. Sturm und Drang EPK (video)

== Singles ==
1. "Rising Son"
2. "Forever"
3. "Indian"
