= Omenahotelli =

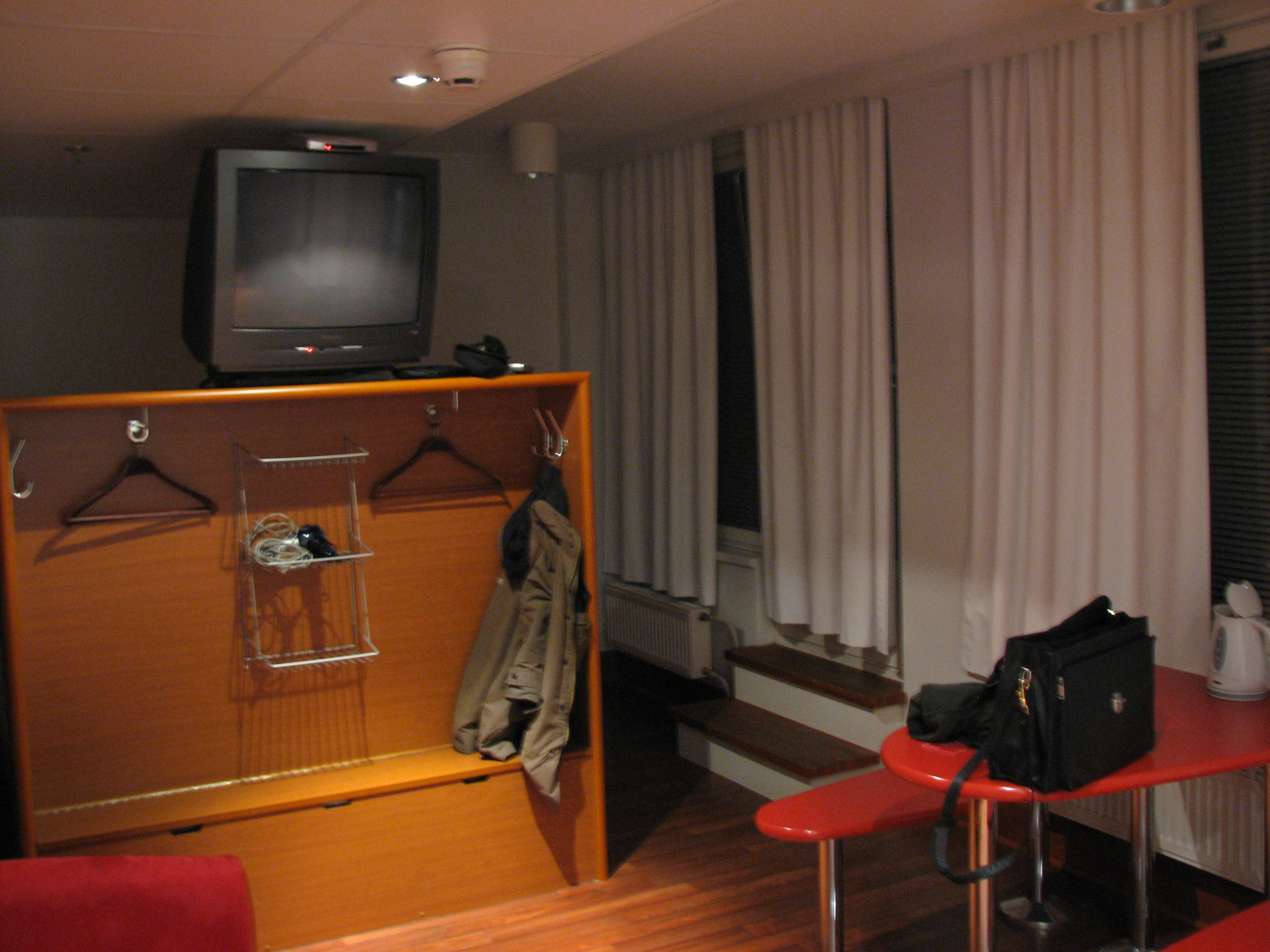
In all Omena hotels there are rooms for four people and follow the same standard. There is one double bed and two fold-out bed-chairs, convertible to two single beds. There is a TV and internet access, and a coffee/tea cooker, and a mini-fridge. This picture is from Tampere.

Omena-hotelli (Omena Hotels) is a Finnish low cost hotel chain. It is known for central location, cheap rates and self-service. There is no reception desk or receptionists in the hotels – rooms are booked and paid for on the internet. The customer then receives a passcode which unlocks the front door and the room for the duration of the stay.

== Hotels ==
- Tampere
- Turku (two hotels)
- Vaasa
- Helsinki (two hotels)
- Jyväskylä
- Pori
