= Kirst =

Kirst is a German surname. Notable people with the surname include:

- Alex Kirst, drummer in The Nymphs, an alternative rock band of the late 1980s
- Edgar Kirst (born 1951), German athletics competitor
- Hans Hellmut Kirst (1914–1989), German novelist and the author of 46 books
- Joachim Kirst (born 1947), retired East German decathlete
- Jutta Kirst (born 1954), retired female track and field athlete who competed for East Germany
- Michael W. Kirst (born 1939), professor
- Rita Kirst (born 1950), German high jumper
- Roger Kirst, Henry M. Grether Professor of Law at the University of Nebraska–Lincoln College of Law
- Whitey Kirst, American-Canadian rock guitarist, singer, and songwriter

== See also ==
- Kaarst
- Karste
- Kirsteen
- Kirsten
- Kirsti
- Kirstin
- Kirsty
- Kursztyn
