= Kirsten =

Kirsten may refer to:

- Kirsten (given name)
- Kirsten (surname)
- Hurricane Kirsten (disambiguation), two tropical cyclones in the Eastern Pacific Ocean

== See also ==
- Kirsteen
- Kirst
- Kristen
- Kirsty
