= Kirste =

Kirste is a surname. Notable people with the surname include:

- Gerd Kirste (1918–2014), Norwegian politician
- Stephan Kirste (born 1962), German legal scholar and professor
- Thomas Kirste (born 1977), German politician

== See also ==
- Kirsti
