= Kirsti =

- Gender: Female

Origin
- Meaning: Nordic form of Christine
- Region of origin: Nordic

Other names
- Related names: Kersti, Kirsten, Kjersti, Kjærsti

Kirsti is a feminine given name. Related names include Kersti, Kirsten, Kjersti. Notable people with the name include:

- Kirsti Andersen (born 1941), Danish historian of mathematics
- Kirsti Bergstø (born 1981), Norwegian politician
- Kirsti Biermann (born 1950), Norwegian speed skater
- Kirsti Blom (born 1953), Norwegian author
- Kirsti Coward (born 1940), Norwegian judge
- Kirsti Eskelinen (born 1948), Finnish diplomat
- Kirsti Huke (born 1977), Norwegian singer and composer
- Kirsti Ilvessalo (1920–2019), Finnish textile artist
- Kirsti Kauppi (born 1957), Finnish diplomat
- Kirsti Koch Christensen (born 1940), Norwegian linguist
- Kirsti Kolle Grøndahl (born 1943), Norwegian politician
- Kirsti Lay (born 1988), Canadian cyclist and speed skater
- Kirsti Leirtrø (born 1963), Norwegian politician
- Kirsti Lintonen (born 1945), Finnish politician
- Kirsti Lyytikäinen (1926–2008), Finnish businesswoman and journalist
- Kirsti Manninen (born 1952), Finnish writer and screenwriter
- Kirsti Paltto (born 1947), Finnish writer
- Kirsti Saxi (born 1953), Norwegian politician
- Kirsti Sparboe (born 1946), Norwegian singer
- Kirsti Strøm Bull (born 1945), Norwegian professor of law

== See also ==
- Kirsty, a given name
