= Kirstine =

Kirstine is a given name. Notable people with the name include:

- Kirstine Fiil (1918–1983), Danish resistance member
- Kirstine Frederiksen (1845–1903), Danish pedagogue, writer and women's activist
- Kirstine Meyer (1861–1941), Danish physicist
- Kirstine Roepstorff (born 1972), Danish visual artist
- Kirstine Smith (1878–1939), Danish statistician
- Kirstine Stewart (born c. 1968) Canadian media executive and author
- Kirstine Stubbe Teglbjærg, Danish singer

== See also ==
- Kirstin, given name
