= Lyytikäinen =

Lyytikäinen is a Finnish surname.

== Geographical distribution ==
As of 2014, 96.4% of all known bearers of the surname Lyytikäinen were residents of Finland (frequency 1:3,086), 2.2% of Sweden (1:240,165) and 1.2% of Estonia (1:57,464).

In Finland, the frequency of the surname was higher than national average (1:3,086) in the following regions:

1. Southern Savonia (1:536)
2. South Karelia (1:963)
3. Northern Savonia (1:1,217)
4. Kymenlaakso (1:2,163)
5. Päijänne Tavastia (1:2,190)
6. North Karelia (1:2,766)
7. Central Finland (1:2,911)

== People ==
- Jaana Lyytikäinen (born 1982), Finnish football player
- Kirsti Lyytikäinen (1926–2008), Finnish businesswoman and journalist
- Ville Lyytikäinen (1967–2016), Finnish football coach
