= Maruorg Nature Reserve =

Protected area in Estonia

- Location within Estonia
- Location: Estonia
- Coordinates: 57°59′30″N 26°41′00″E
- Area: 32 ha (79 acres)
- Established: 2001 (2016)

Maruorg Nature Reserve (Estonian: Maruoru looduskaitseala) is a nature reserve in Põlva County, Estonia.

The area of the nature reserve is 32 ha.

The protected area was founded in 2001 to protect valuable habitat types and threatened species in Hino and Karste village (both in Kanepi Parish).
