= Uma Aaltonen =

Finnish author, journalist, and Green League politician

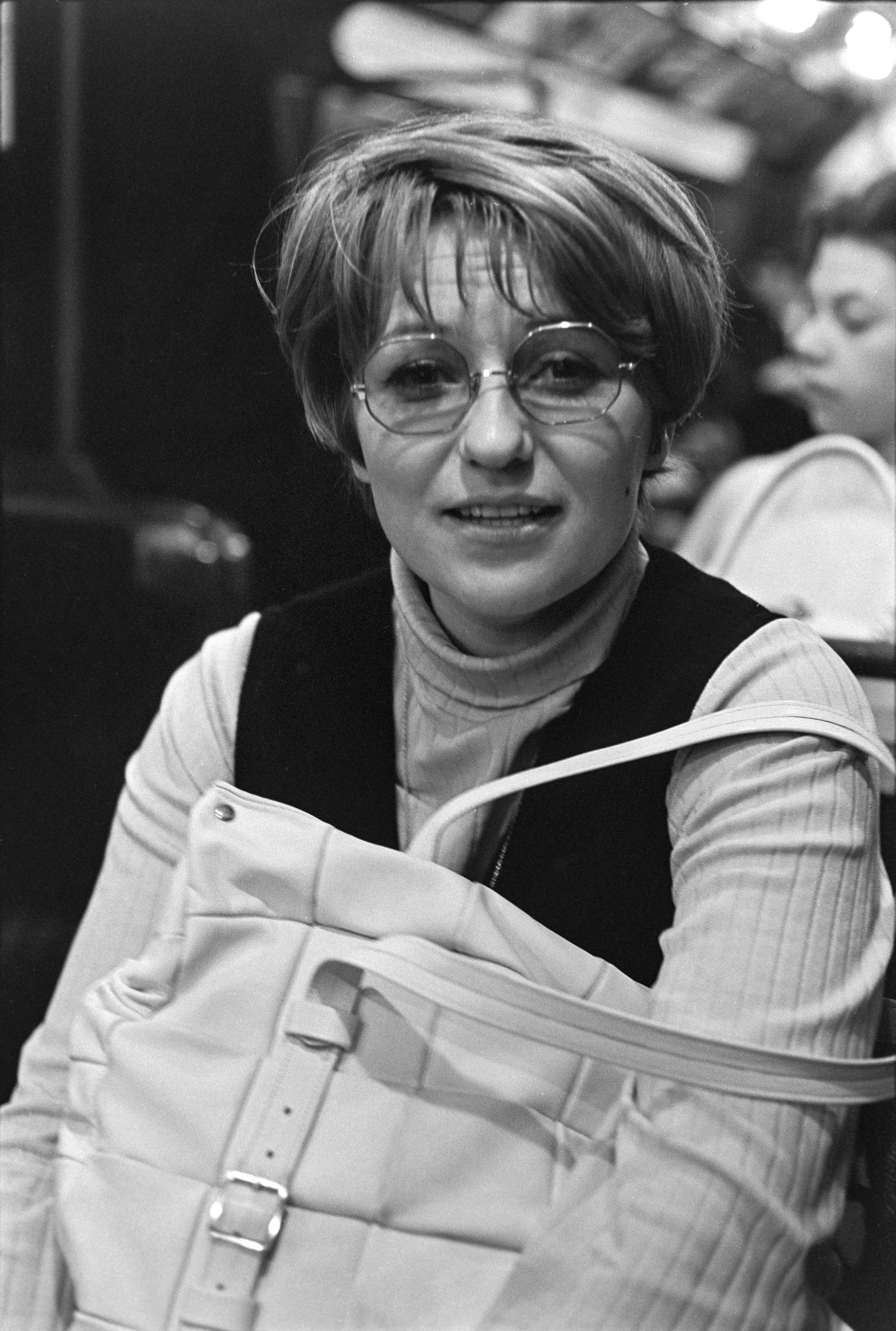
- Ulla-Maija Aaltonen in 1969
- Born: 28 August 1940; Vihti, Finland
- Died: 13 July 2009 (aged 68); Helsinki, Finland
- Occupations: Politician, author, journalist

Ulla-Maija "Uma" Aaltonen (28 August 1940, Vihti – 13 July 2009, Helsinki) was a Finnish author, journalist, and Green League politician.

== Early life and education ==
Aaltonen was raised on a farm and learned to love animals at a very young age. She studied journalism, sociology and psychology at the University of Tampere.

As a journalist, she was particularly interested in issues of cruelty towards children and animals. She later owned her own farm. Aaltonen spent many years advocating for a statue in Seinajoki celebrating war horses. The monument was unveiled in 1996.

Aaltonen was diagnosed with multiple sclerosis in 1993.

== Career ==
Aaltonen worked as a journalist at YLE and contributed to Anna magazine. She wrote a number of books for young people about sex education and animal cruelty.

In 1994 she served as manager for Elisabeth Rehn's presidential campaign.

Aaltonen served in the European Parliament between 2003 and 2004 representing the Greens-EFA party, after fellow Green Party politician Heidi Hautala returned to the Finnish Parliament. During her term, Aaltonen was an outspoken advocate for European patients with MS. In December 2003 she addressed the European Parliament about concerns regarding discrimination against people with MS in the European Union.

In the fall of 2008 of Aaltonen was elected to Vihti Municipal Council.

== Death ==
Aaltonen complained of pain in early July 2009 and was admitted to Töölö Hospital in Helsinki. She died suddenly on July 13, 2009.
