= Kirsty =

- Pronunciation: (Kir-stee)
- Gender: Female

Origin
- Meaning: Christian or follower of Christ
- Region of origin: Scotland

Other names
- Related names: Christine, Kirsten, Kirsti

Kirsty or Kirstie is a feminine given name and nickname.

It is a Scottish diminutive of Christine in English-speaking countries and is also linked to Kirsten — the Scandinavian version of Christine.

== People ==
- Kirstie Alley (1951–2022), American actress
- Kirstie Allsopp (born 1971), British TV presenter
- Kirsty Bentley (1983–1998), New Zealand murder victim
- Kirsty Bertarelli (born Kirsty Roper in 1971), songwriter, former Miss UK
- Kirsty Blackman (born 1986), Scottish politician
- Kirsty Brown (died 2003), biologist killed by a leopard seal
- Kirsty Capes (born 1993), English novelist
- Kirstie Clements (born 1962), Australian author, editor, journalist and speaker, former editor-in-chief of Vogue Australia
- Kirsty Coventry (born 1983), Zimbabwean swimmer, world record holder, and International Olympic Committee President
- Kirsty Dillon (born 1976), English actress
- Kirsty Duncan (1966–2026), Canadian politician and medical geographer
- Kirsty Gallacher (born 1976), Scottish television presenter
- Kirsty Gilmour (born 1993), Scottish badminton player
- Kirsty Hawkshaw (born 1969), English electronic music singer and songwriter
- Kirsty Hill (born 1991), English professional boxer
- Kirsty Howard (1995–2015), English woman born with a rare medical condition who raised millions for charity
- Kirsty Hume (born 1976), Scottish model
- Kirsty Jones (died 2000), British murder victim
- Kirsty Jones, Welsh professional kitesurfer
- Kirsty Lang (born 1962), British journalist and broadcaster
- Kirstie Levell (born 1997), English football goalkeeper
- Kirsty McBride (born 1985), Scottish footballer
- Kirsty MacColl (1959–2000), English singer-songwriter
- Kirsty Penkman, British biomolecular archaeologist
- Kirsty Stark, Australian film and television producer
- Kirsty-Leigh Porter (born 1988), English actress
- Kirstie Tancock (d, 2016), British organ donation campaigner
- Kirsty Wade (born 1962), British former middle-distance runner
- Kirsty Wark (born 1955), Scottish journalist and television presenter
- Kirsty Williams (born 1971), Welsh politician and former Minister for Education
- Kirsty Young (born 1968), Scottish television and radio presenter

== Fictional characters ==
- Kirsty (Hellraiser), in the Hellraiser movie and book franchise
- Kirsty Branning, from the British soap opera EastEnders
- Kirsty Cotton, commonly known as Dotty Cotton, from the British soap opera EastEnders
- Kirsty Knight (Shortland Street), from the New Zealand soap opera Shortland Street
- Kirsty McGurk, from the Welsh-language soap opera Pobol y Cwm
- Kirsty Millar, from the British soap opera Doctors
- Kirsty Miller, from the British radio soap opera The Archers
- Kirsty Soames, from the British soap opera Coronation Street
- Kirsty Sutherland, from the Australian soap opera Home and Away

== See also ==
- All pages beginning with Kirsty
- All pages beginning with Kirstie
