= Dokk1 =

Coordinates: 56.1535°N 10.2141°E

- Dokken or Dok-Ét
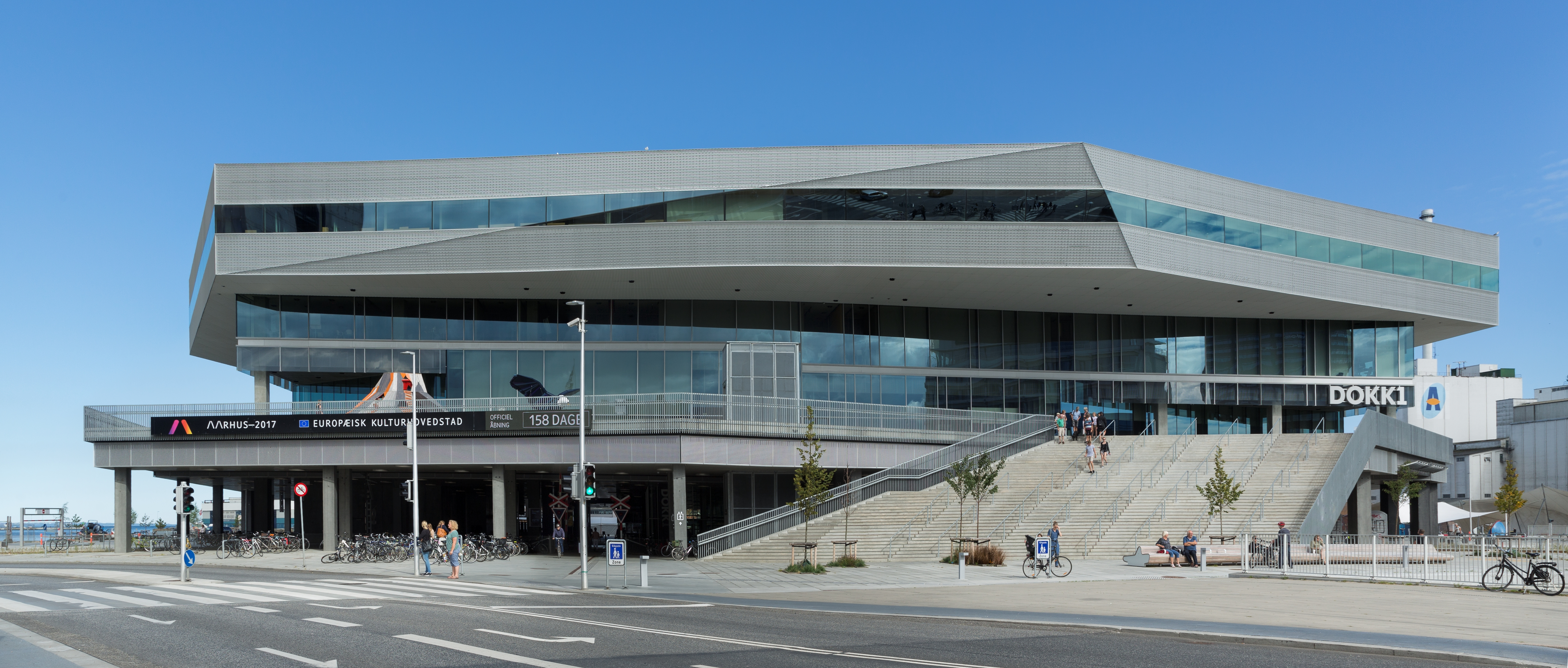
- Interactive map of the Dokk1 area

General information
- Location: Aarhus, Denmark
- Completed: 2015

Technical details
- Floor count: 4
- Floor area: 60,000 m^{2} (650,000 sq ft)

Design and construction
- Architect: Schmidt Hammer Lassen Architects

Other information
- Parking: Automated parking for 1000 cars

Website
- Official Website

Dokk1 or Dokken is a government building, public library and culture center in Aarhus, Denmark. It is situated on Hack Kampmanns Plads in the city center by the waterfront next to the Custom House. Dokk1 is part of the much larger development project Urban Mediaspace Aarhus, jointly financed by Aarhus Municipality and Realdania for 2.1 billion DKK. It is designed by Schmidt Hammer Lassen Architects and Kristine Jensen, with construction managed by NCC AB. Construction broke ground 8 June 2011 and the building was inaugurated four years later on 20 June 2015.

The name of the building was determined by a public contest held in the autumn of 2012. The combination of letters and number can be pronounced as "Dokken", "Dok-Ét" or "Dok-Een", meaning The Dock or Dock One in English. The term references the location on the former industrial harbor by the waterfront.

== The building ==
Dokk1 houses the Aarhus Main Library, the municipal public services department, theater scenes, businesses and a large automated underground parking facility. The building contains 60,000 m^{2} (650,000 sq ft) of floorspace, with 17,500 m^{2} (188,000 sq ft) used by the library and 10,500 m^{2} (113,000 sq ft) for let by businesses. The remainder of the building is mainly the underground automated parking facility which features 20 lifts and space for 1000 vehicles. The structure is integrated with the light rail system with trains running through and under the building including a station.

=== Architecture ===
The Dokk1 project represents a trend of combining different cultural purposes under one roof along with commercial or business functions. The building houses both public library, municipal services and concert/theater space while the upper floor of the building is for let and the parking garage in the basement is privately operated. Other examples from Denmark comprise Nordvests Culture House, Ørestad's School and Kulturværftet in Helsingør. The neo-futuristic building is designed as a heptagonal metal disc floating above a glass prism which rests on a bed of wide irregular staircases to all sides. The metal disc holds offices and administration while the glass prism houses the public library, designed to be transparent to all sides and making all activities within visible from the outside, while providing a view across the harbour, bay, forest and city from within.

=== Sustainability ===
Dokk1 has been built and designed with a clear focus on a low energy consumption and sustainability, both in the construction phase and in the long-term operational phase and it meets the Danish class 2015 low energy requirements. Among the many initiatives, a 2,432 m^{2} (26,180 sq ft) solar panel has been added to the roof, seawater is used as a coolant for both excessive heat and ventilation and LED lights are used extensively. Robust, natural, environmentally friendly and recyclable materials have been used for the constructions. Sustainability are among the seven core values for Dokk1.

=== Accessibility ===
Accessibility has also been given a high priority at Dokk1. This has been obtained by the use of special designs, furnishings and technology. Elevators, escalators, inclines, adaptable counters, hearing loop systems and pictogram signage are among the solutions. Dokk1 is accessible via a station of Aarhus Letbane just before the lower entrance.

=== Art ===
In the planning for the project, 1% of the cost was set aside for art and decoration. Above the central staircase in the library hangs a large bronze pipe bell designed by Kirstine Roepstorff. It is 7.5 metres (25 ft) long, 80 centimetres (31 in) wide and weighs close to 3 tonnes (3.3 tons). The bell is connected to the Aarhus University Hospital where parents can push a button to activate it when their newborns have been successfully delivered. Outside, below the central staircase and in the ceiling of the underground carpark, is another large art installation, known as "Magic Mushroom"s. Invented by the Berlin-based art-cooperative Elmgreen & Dragset, "Magic Mushrooms" consists of a 300 m^{2} (3,200 sq ft) downscaled 1:100 model of an imaginary city, turned upside down.

=== Playgrounds ===
A four section outside playground adorns the broad encircling concrete deck. Known as Kloden (The Globe), each section represents various cultures and regions of the world. In the south there is a jungle, a large ape and drawings reminiscent of Egypthian hieroglyphs; all representing the African continent. In the East is an Asian dragon and a six-metre-tall (20 ft) bear, representing Russia and Eastern Europe. White wooden platforms fastened on heavy springs are imitating floating sheets of ice from the Arctic in the northern section and a large wooden eagle at an erupting volcano represents Iceland and the American continent in the west.

=== Wind panel scandal ===
The climate of Denmark includes long periods of sustained wind and rain, which requires special materials and construction techniques. In June 2016, it was reported that the 6,400 m^{2} (69,000 sq ft) of MgO boards, used as wind-barriers behind the building's outward facade, had absorbed water, causing rust and material damage. Over time the damage would evolve and become structural and catastrophic, if the boards were left in place. Workers began changing the plates in September 2016, but the financial aspects of the case has not been settled yet; tax payers will likely foot the bill for the repairs. A leading Danish building expert has estimated the cost to be 19–26 million Danish kroner (€5M).

Since 2014, the use of MgO plates has caused (and could potentially cause) significant structural damage to buildings in Denmark, and Dokk1 is just one of several costly cases in the country.

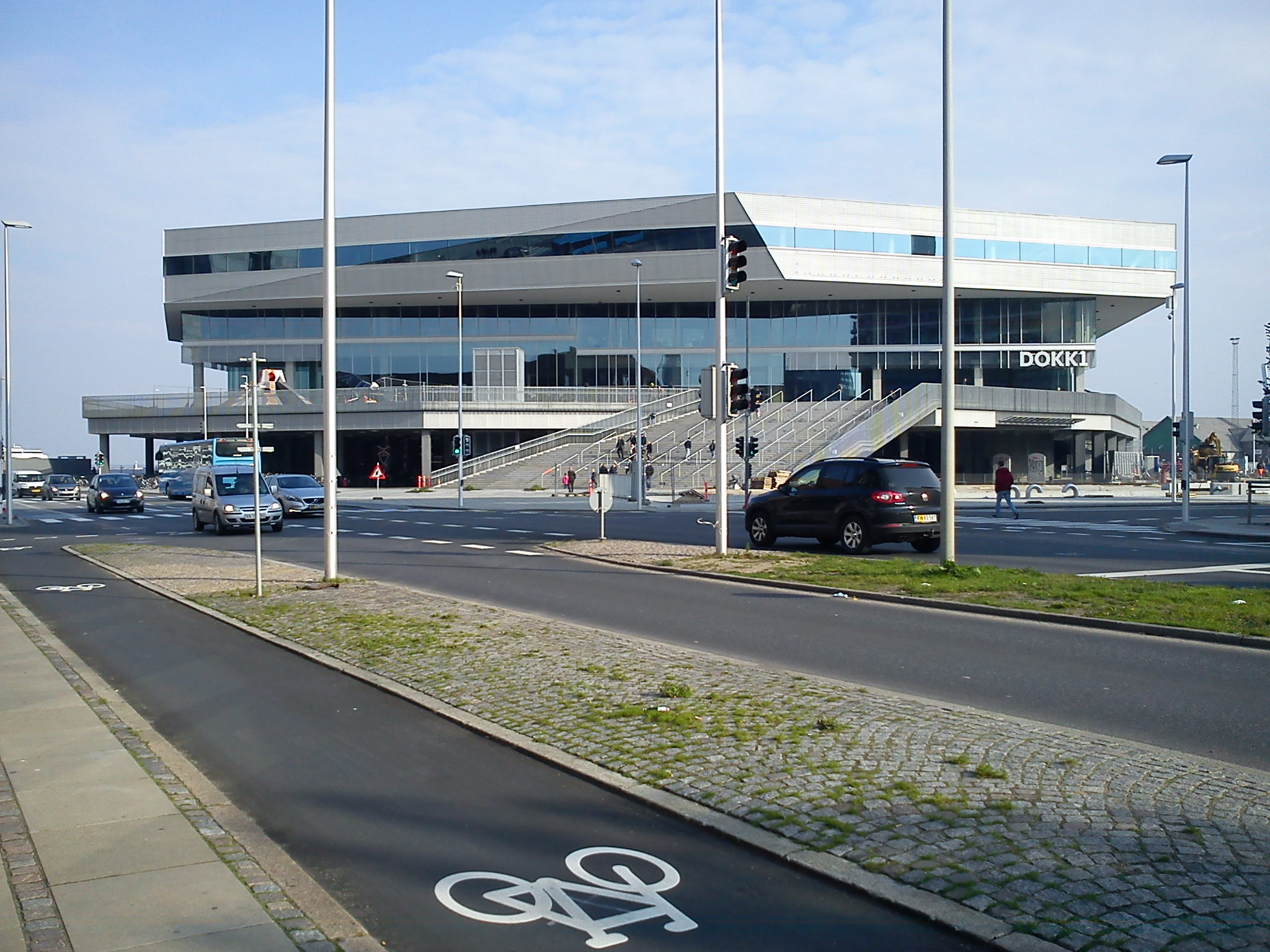
Square of Europaplads (main entrances)

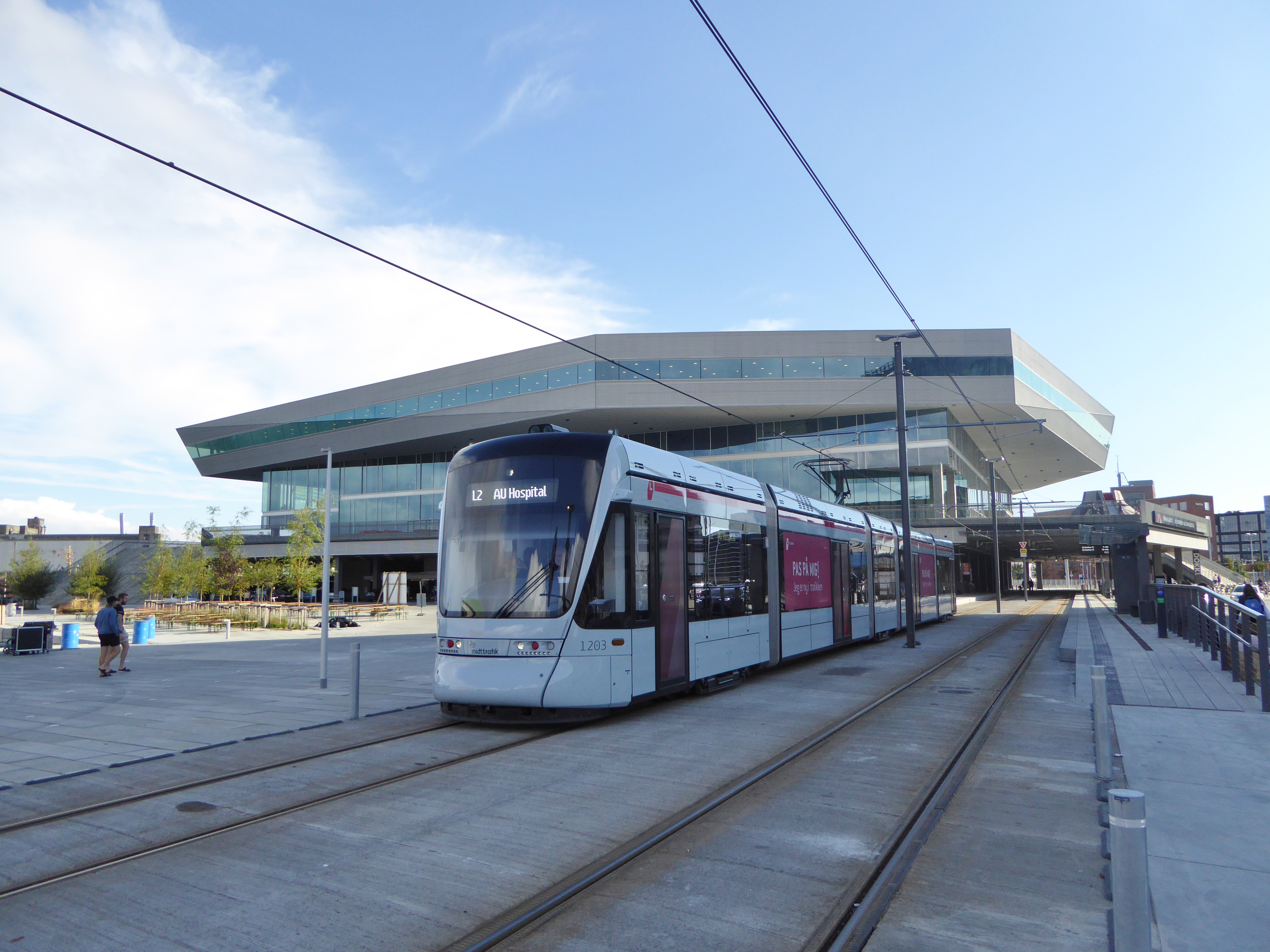
Light rail station

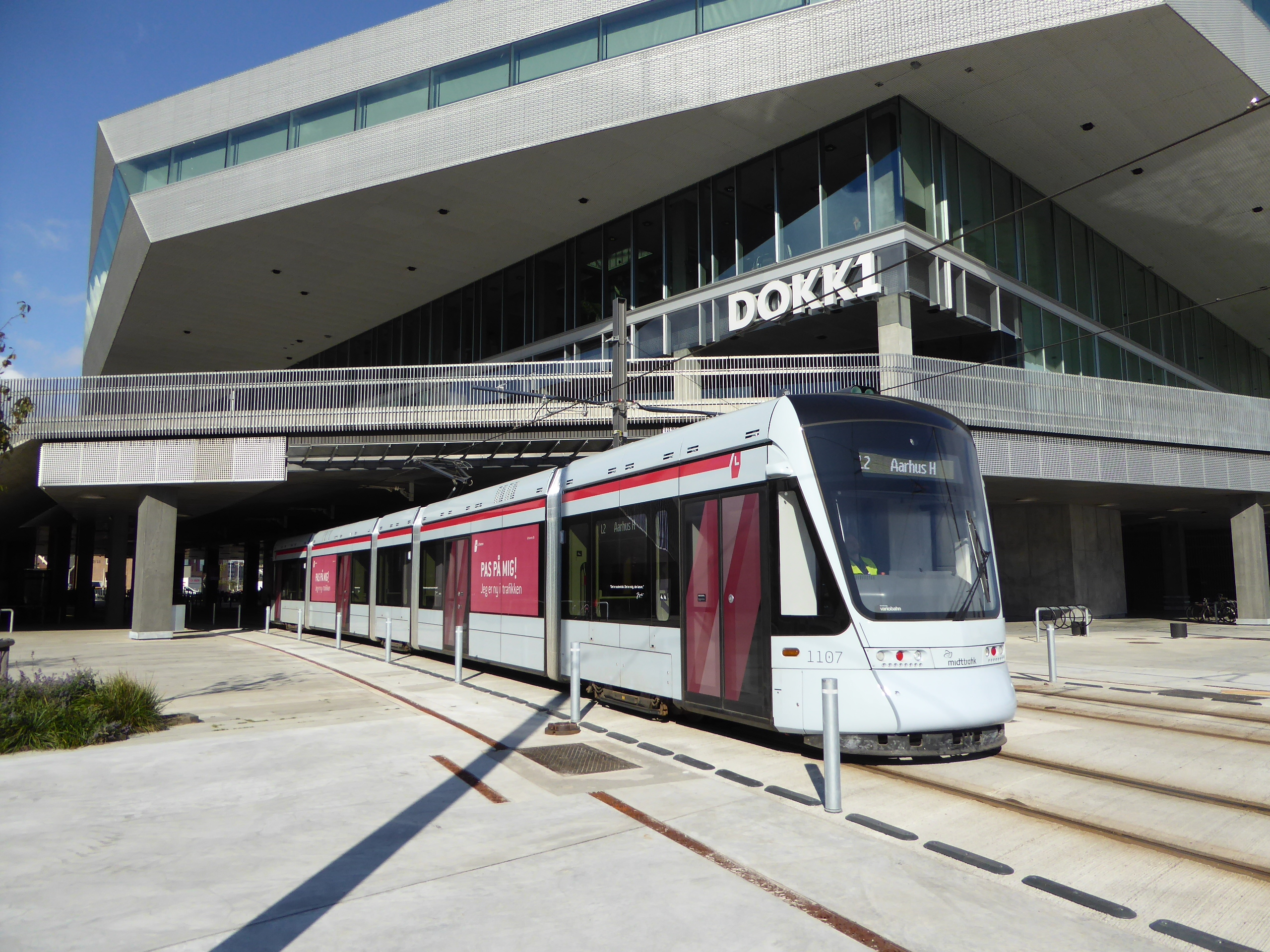
Light rail through the building

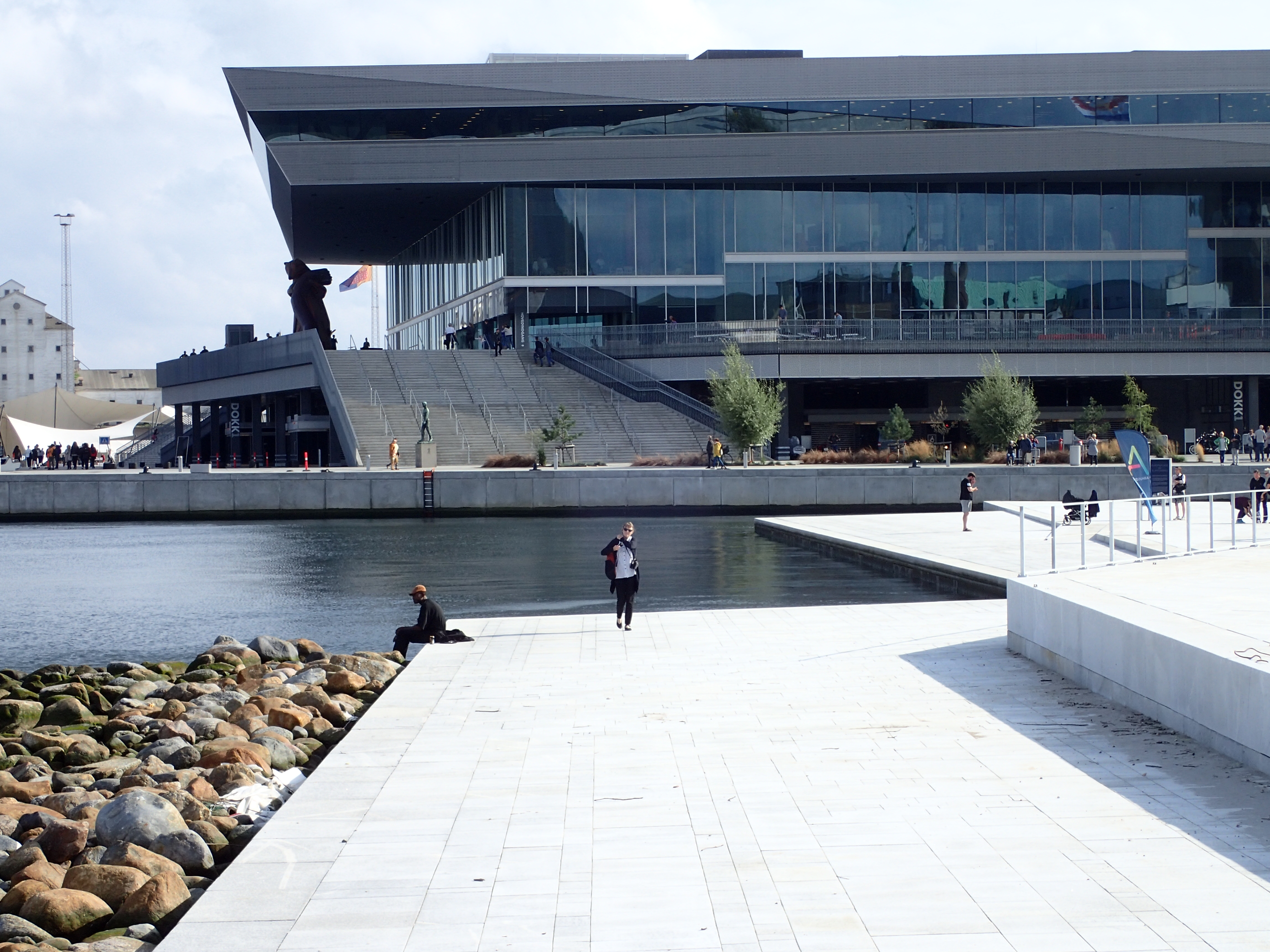
Hack Kampmann Square (2017)

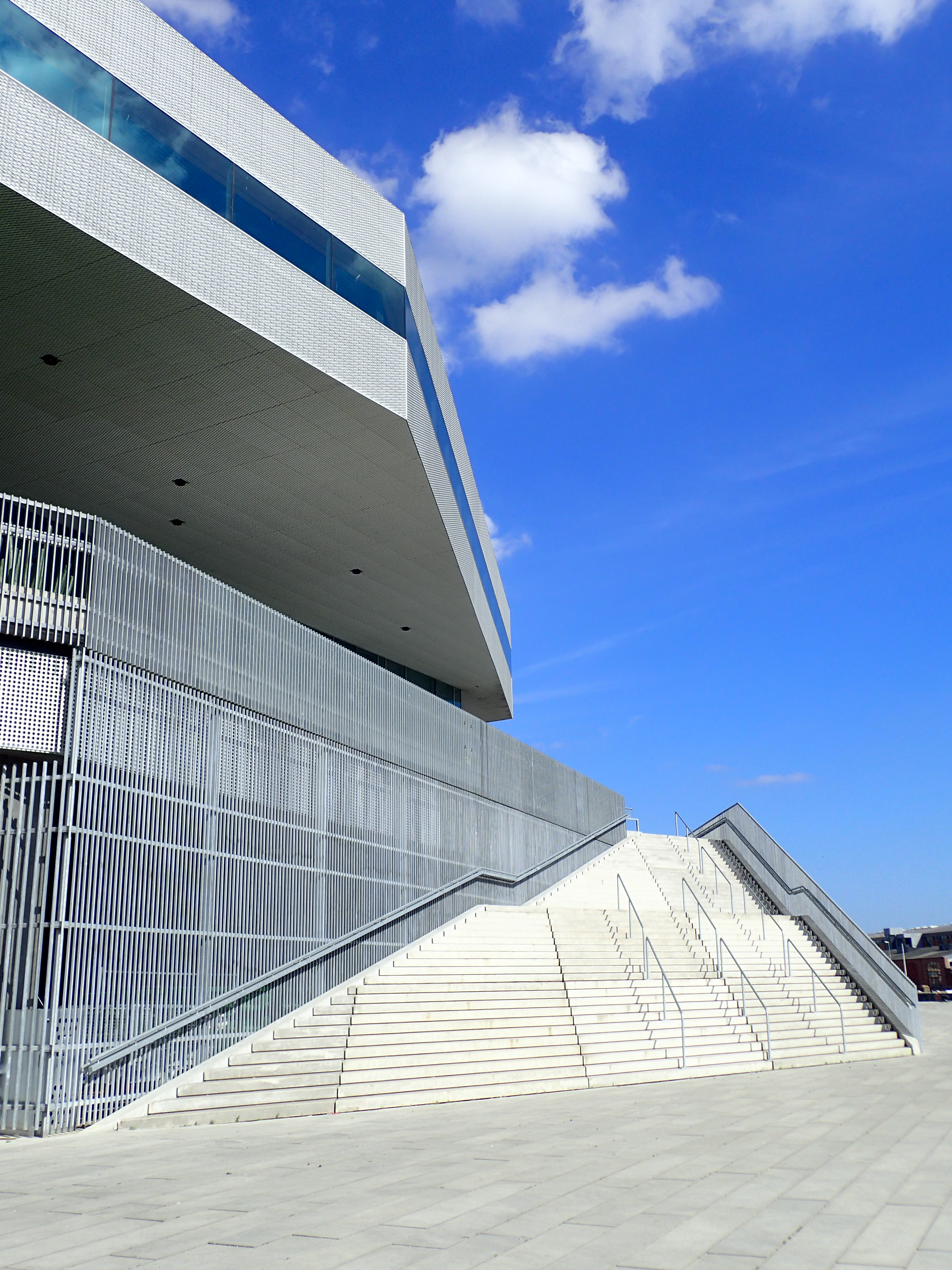
Stairs

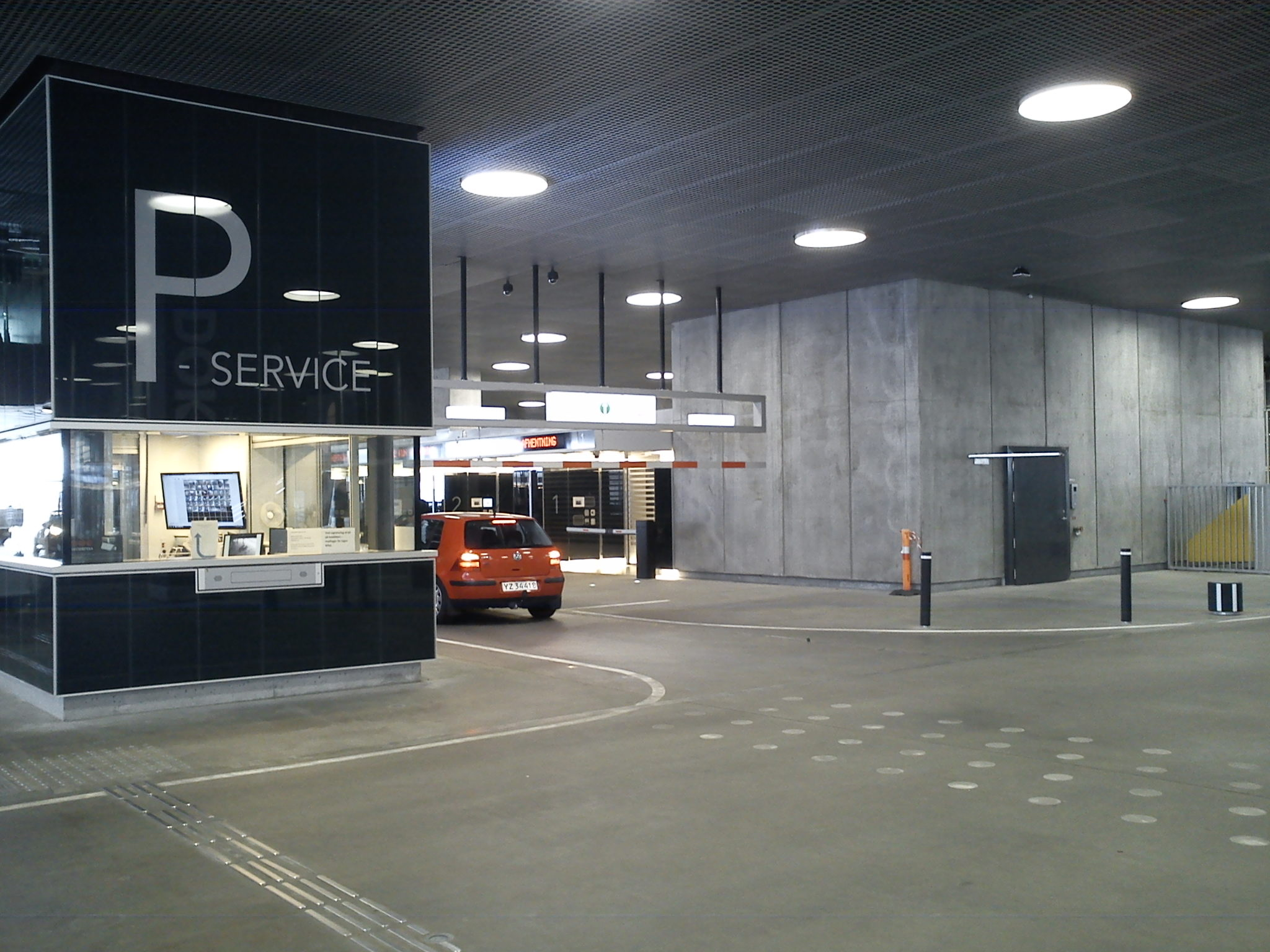
Parking area

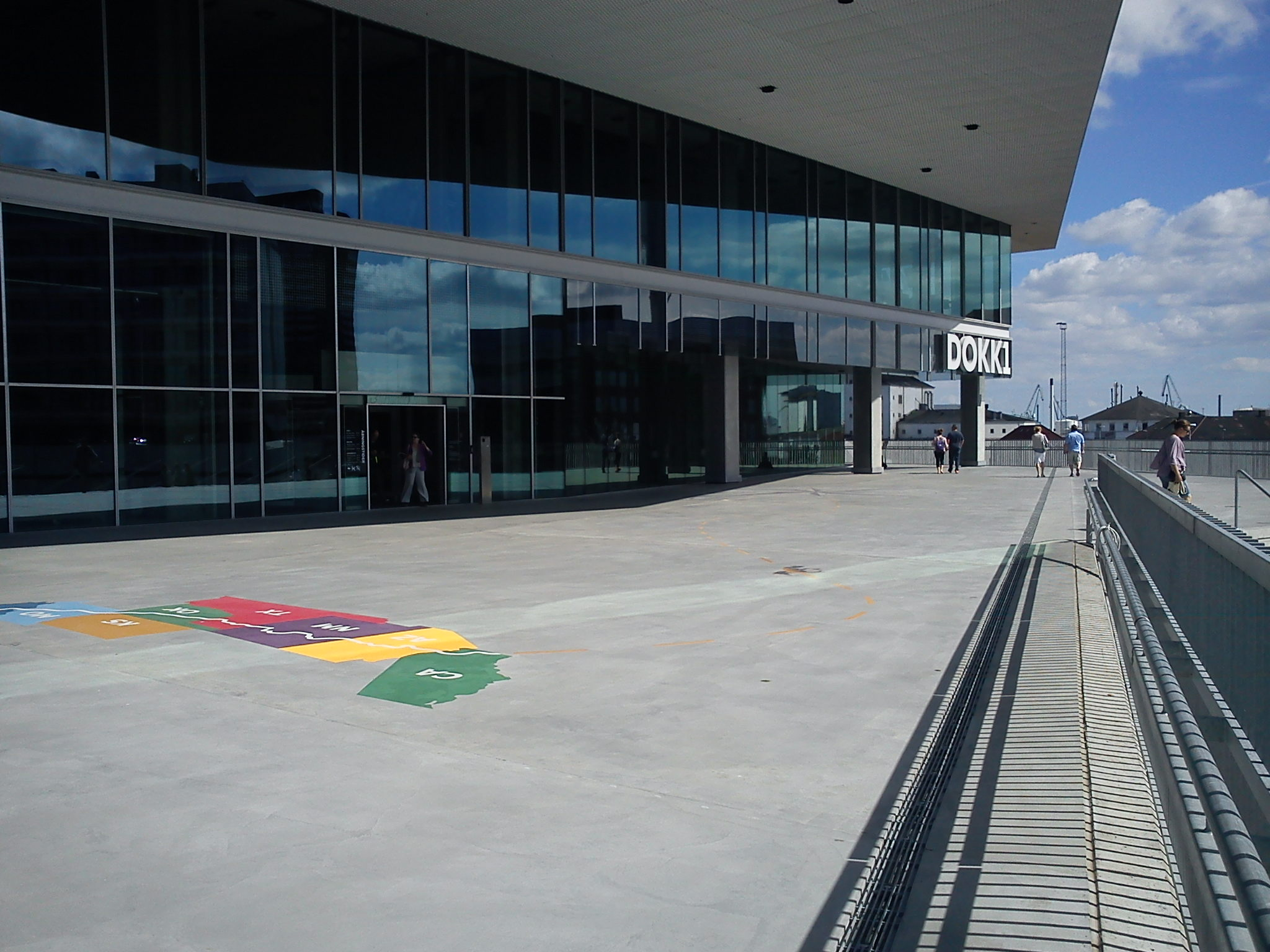
The concrete deck and main entrances

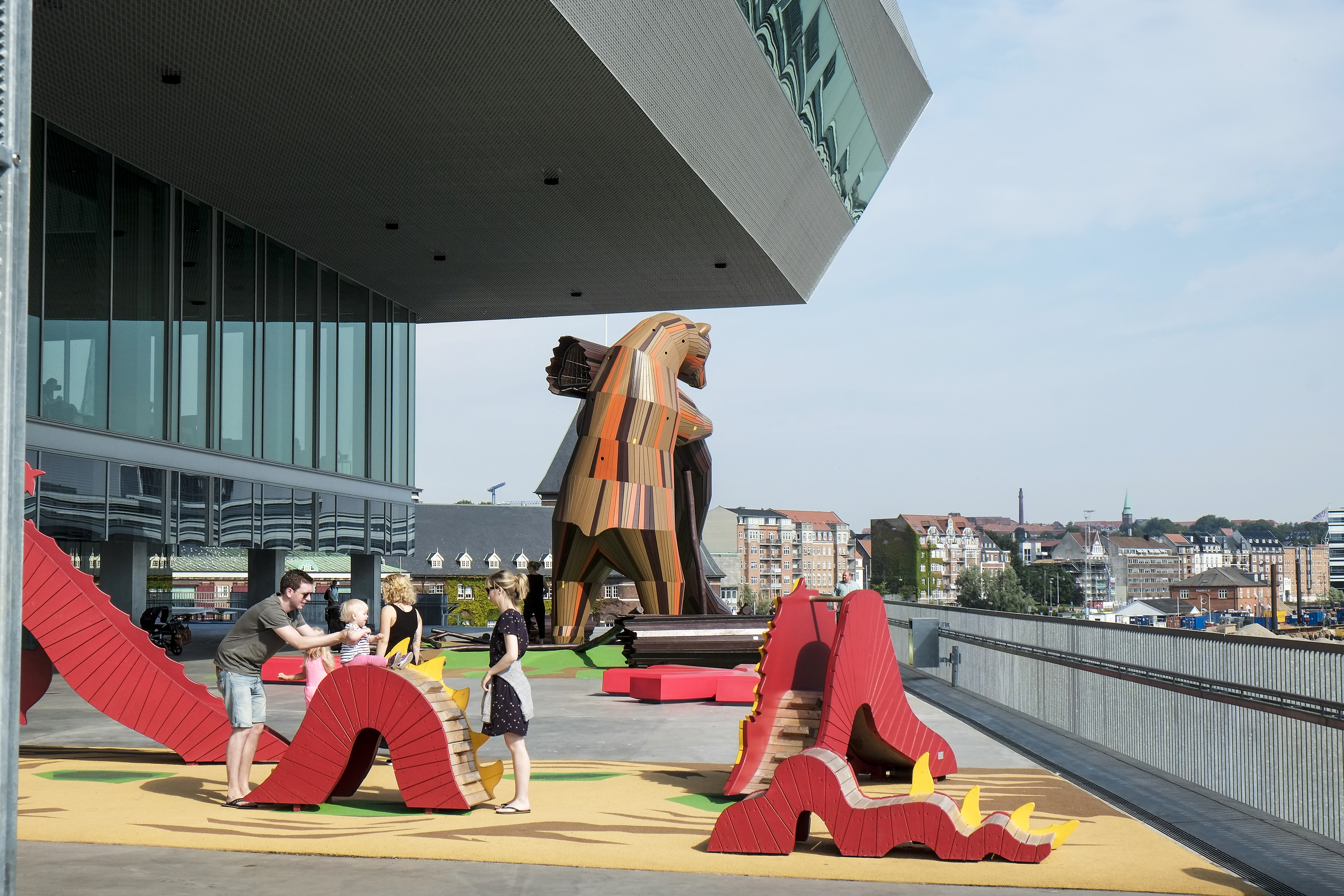
Outside playgrounds

== Library and culture center ==
The library is Aarhus Main Library, the largest in the municipality and the central book repository and administration of local libraries within the municipality. It is also the largest public library in Scandinavia.

The library is split across two levels containing various departments such as literary fiction, professional literature, magazines, newspapers, media, exhibitions, a café area, several lounges and a section for children of different ages. There are two event halls, intended for talks, lectures, small concerts, theatre and film screenings. The large hall (Danish: Store Sal) has room for 300 seats, and the small hall (Danish: Lille Sal) has room for 70 seats. The library also includes specially equipped study, reading, and meeting rooms and public computers. The library is situated in a transparent glass structure circumvented by a wide outdoor pathway. The outdoor pathway has four playgrounds collectively referred to as Kloden (The Globe) and recreational areas.

An innovative cornerstone behind the development of Dokk1, is how citizens and organisations are participating and incorporated in the design processes of the library and cultural center, both in the original design of the place and in the ever-evolving designs of the center's future. In cooperation with the international design-organisation IDEO and Chicago Public Libraries, a general design tool kit was developed in 2013-14 that could also be applied for future libraries in order to facilitate changes on a global scale. The tool kit development was financially supported by the Global Libraries program, a branch of the Bill & Melinda Gates Foundation.

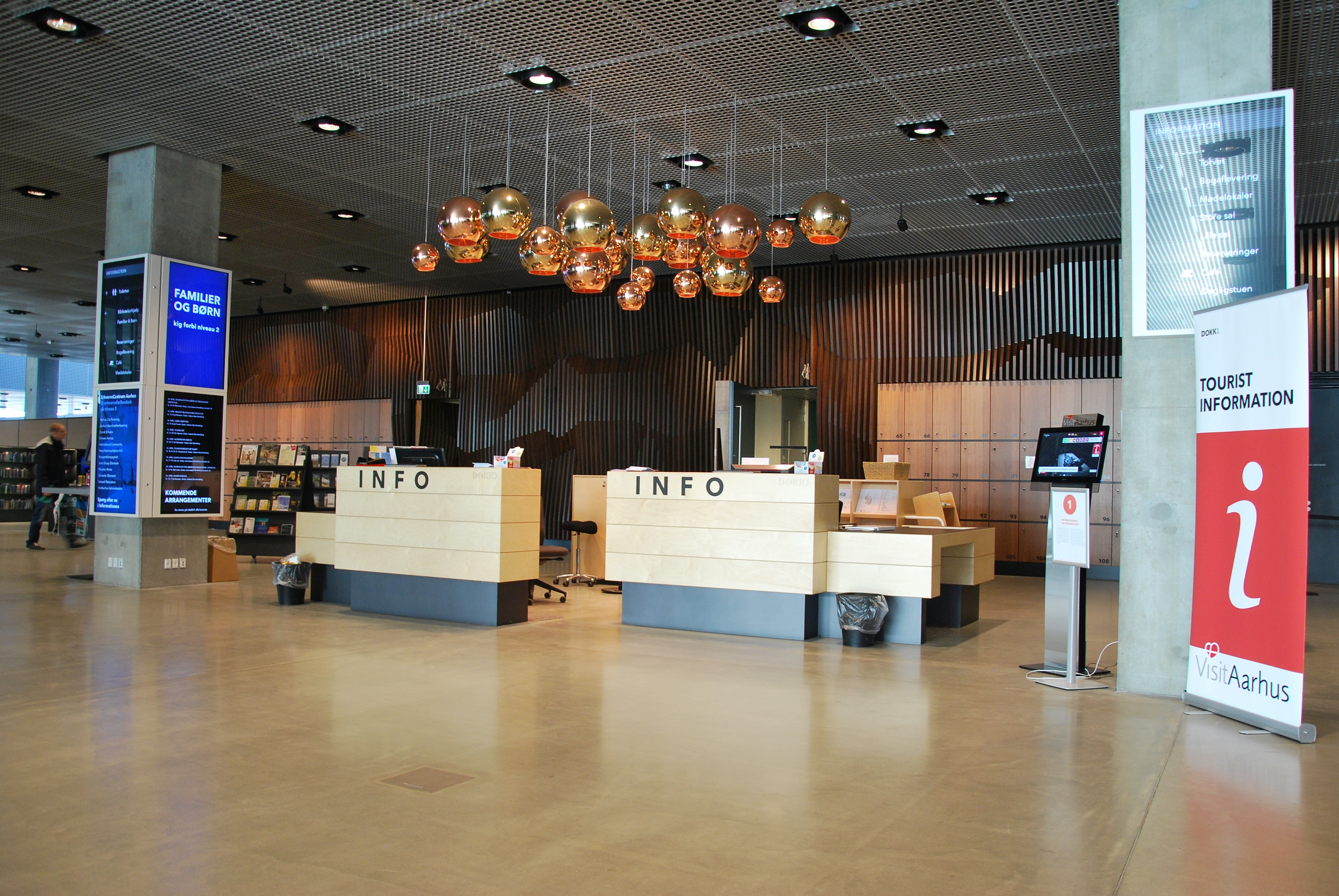
Reception and information desk

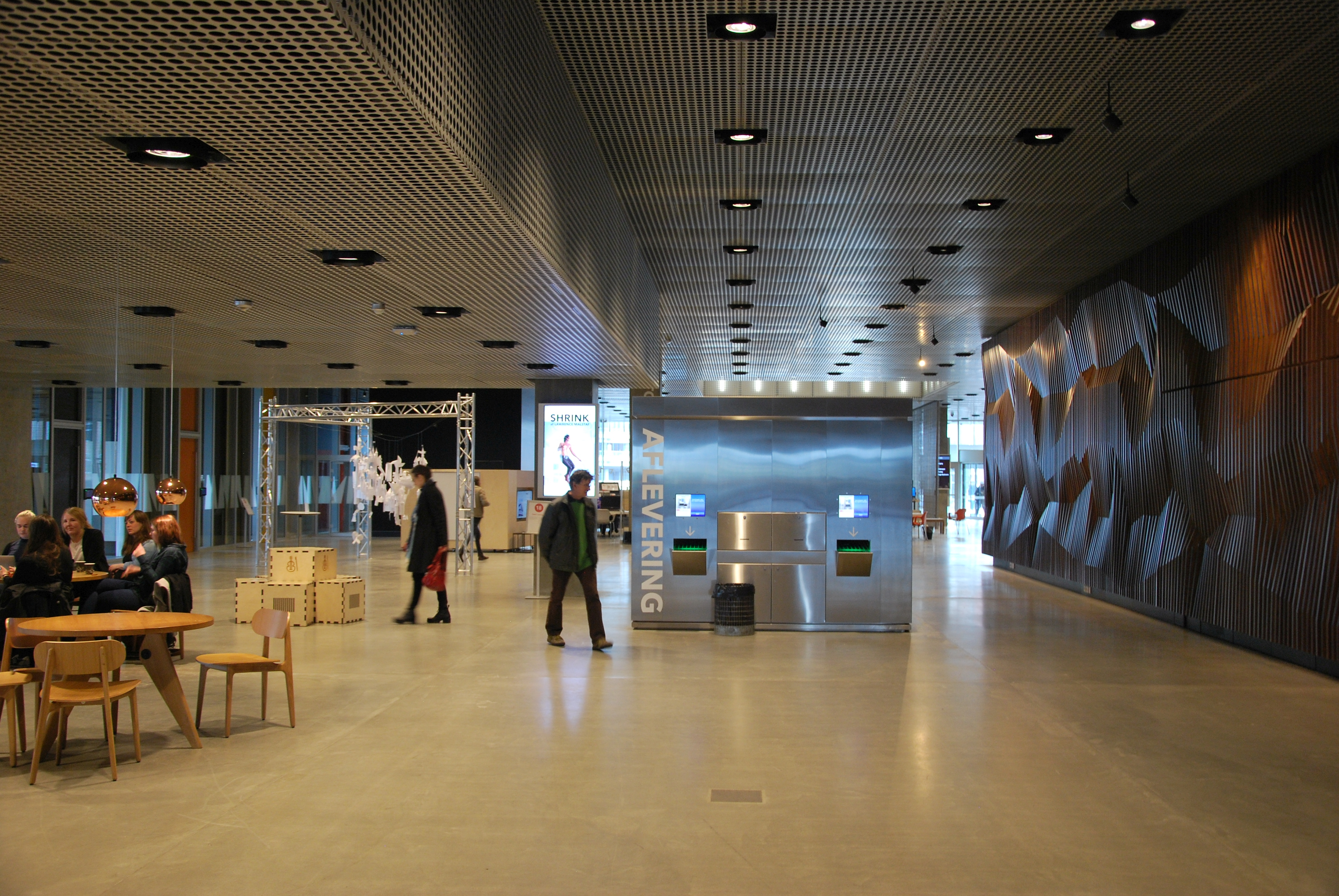
Robotic book and media delivery system

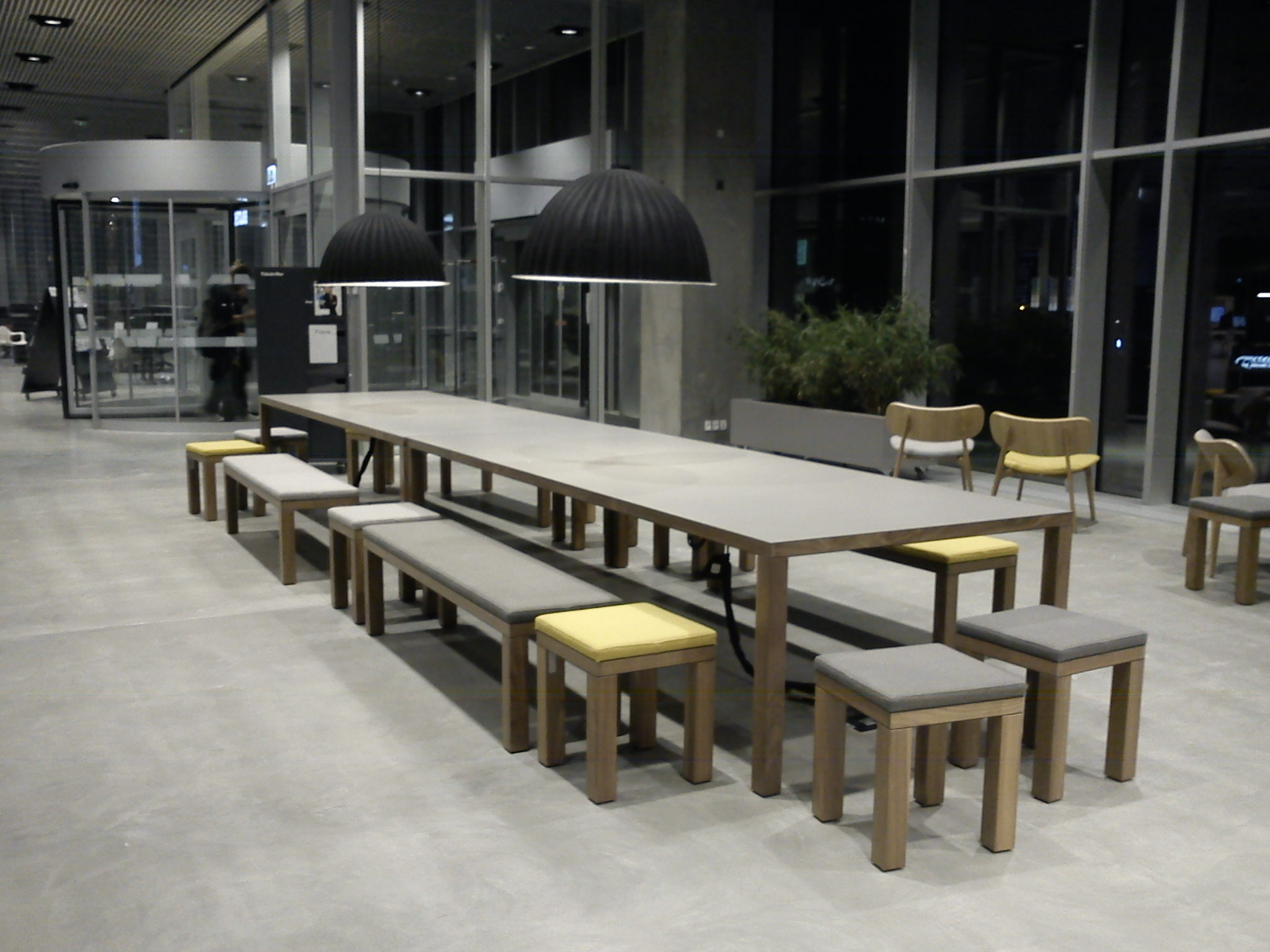
Areas for resting, casual meetings, reading or writing

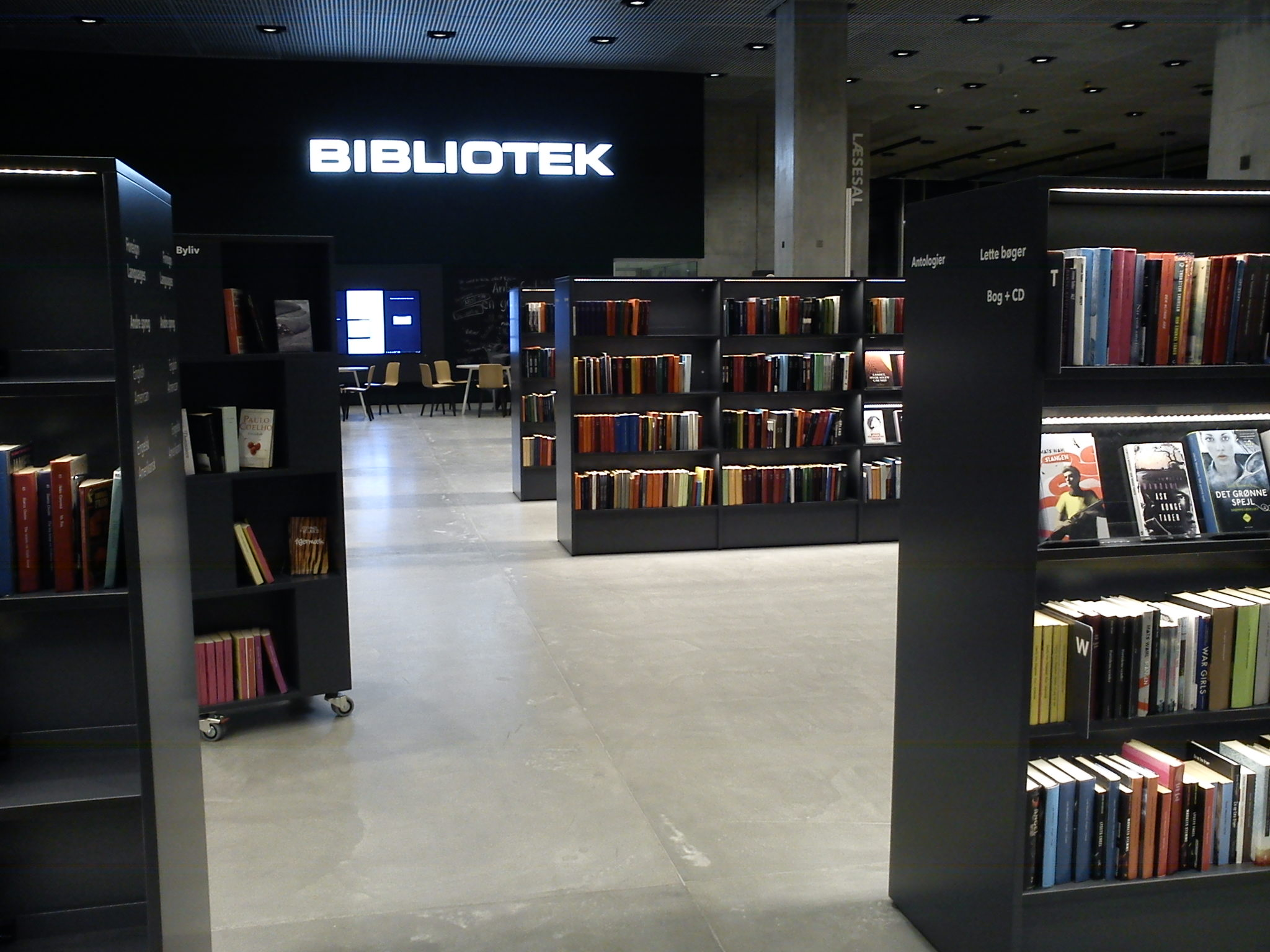
Book shelves at the literary fiction department

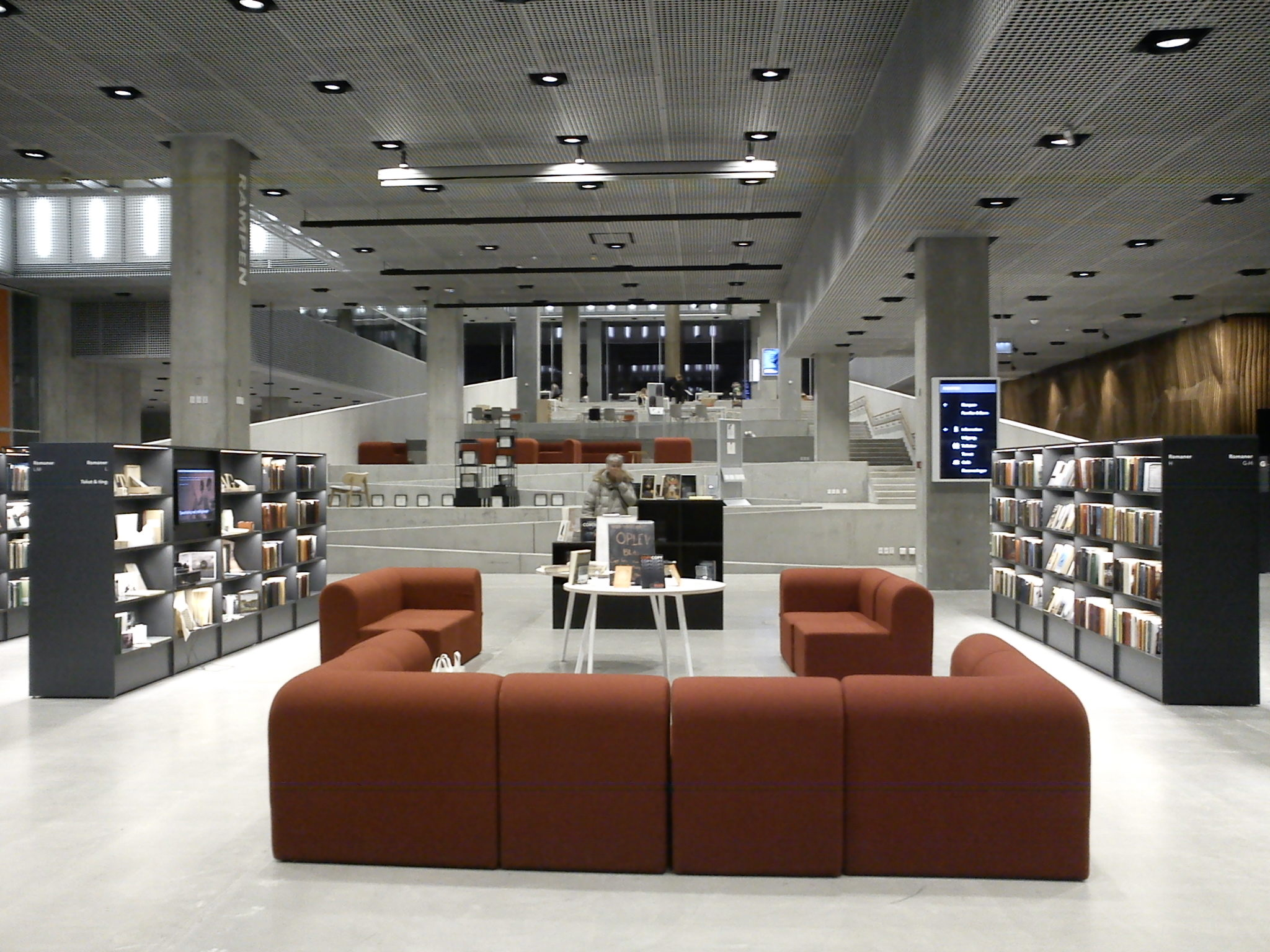
The ramp leading to the second floor of the library

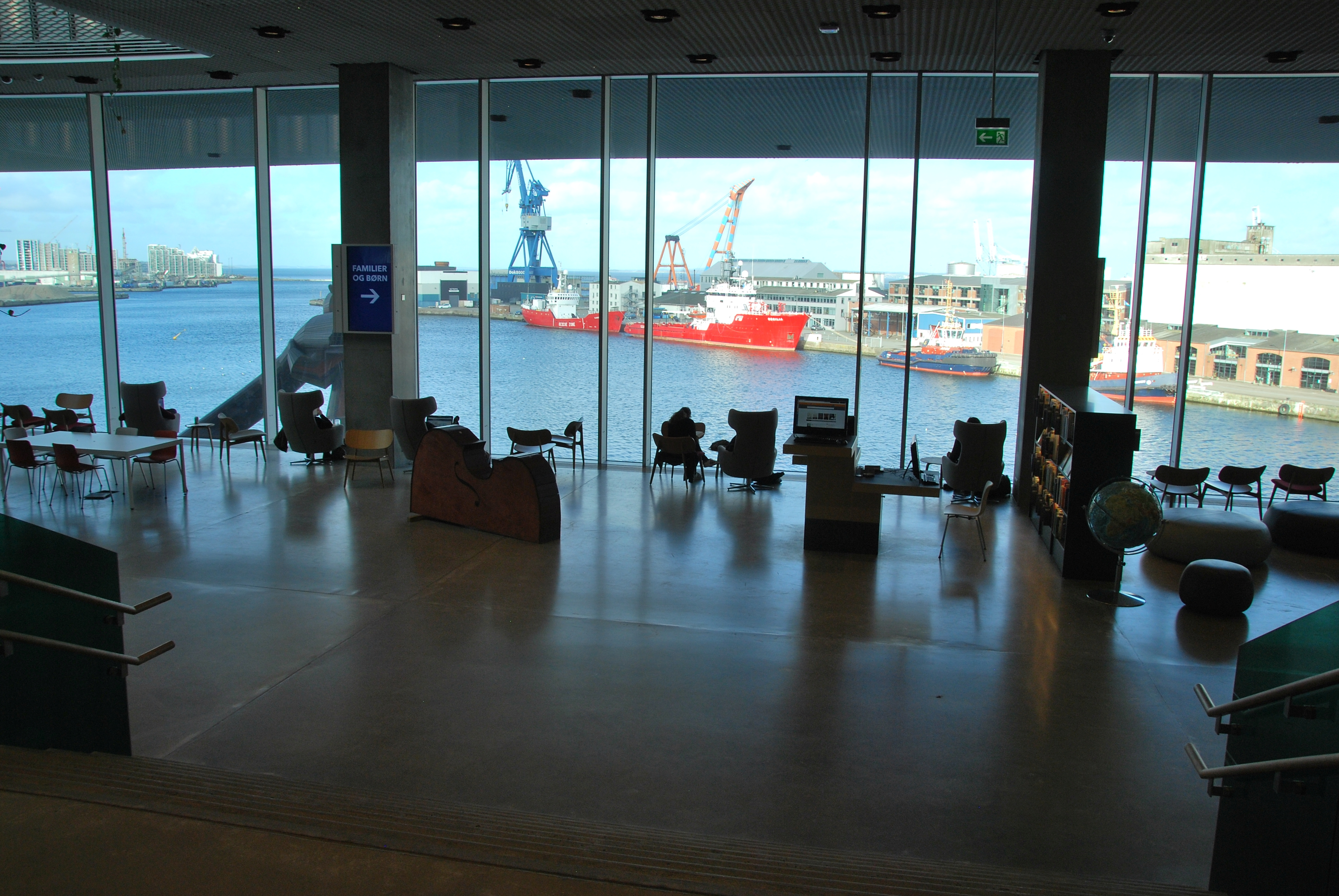
Outward view through the glass walls across the harbour

== Awards ==
In 2015, Dokk1 was awarded a commendation in the category "Cultural Regeneration" at the MIPIM AR Future Projects Awards.

In 2016, Dokk1 was named Public Library of the Year by the International Federation of Library Associations and Institutions.

== Urban Mediaspace ==
Dokk1 is part of an effort to re-purpose former industrial areas of the Port of Aarhus into residential and commercial areas. The north harbor is being developed into the predominantly residential Aarhus Ø neighborhood, while the central stretch of waterfront along the Indre By neighborhood is developed into public and recreational spaces currently referred to as De Bynære Havnearealer (The Peri-urban Harbour-areas) under the project "Urban Mediaspace Aarhus", or simply Urban Mediaspace. Apart from the Dokk1 building at the river mouth, the Urban Mediaspace project covers the opening of the Aarhus River, renovation of Europa Plads square, climate change adaptations (including an underground rainwater retention reservoir), and construction of the new public squares of Hack Kampmanns Plads and Havnepladsen.
