= Anna (Finnish magazine) =

Finnish women's magazine

- Categories: Women's magazine
- Frequency: Weekly
- Founded: 1963
- First issue: August 1963
- Company: Otava Media
- Country: Finland
- Based in: Helsinki
- Language: Finnish

Anna is a women's magazine based in Helsinki, Finland. Founded in 1963 it is one of the earliest women magazines in the country.

== History and profile ==
Anna was launched in 1963. The cover of the first issue which was published in August 1963 featured Johanna Toivonen, a Finnish fashion model and stewardess. The founding company was Apulehti, a publishing house, which would be renamed as A-lehdet in 1981.

The magazine is part of Otava Media and published on a weekly basis. Its target audience is middle-class women living in cities.

The magazine encourages the emancipation of women and described itself as a feminist magazine in the 1980s. Kirsti Lyytikäinen, the first editor-in-chief of Anna, was instrumental in creating this approach. In addition, its contributors have a leftist political stance. However, in 2013 a female journalist of the magazine was fired due to her negative writings about L'Oreal which was a major advertiser for the magazine. During this incident the editor-in-chief of the magazine was Emma Koivula who urged her to resign from the post.

Anna focuses on the profiles of Finnish female politicians and also covers the international career path of Finnish fashion models. Uma Aaltonen is one of the contributors of the magazine. In 2003 Anna sold 502,000 copies. As of 2008 the magazine had more than 100,000 readers.
