= Kirsten (surname) =

Kirsten is a surname which may refer to:

== People ==
- Amy Beth Kirsten (born 1972), American composer
- Benjamin Kirsten (born 1987), German football goalkeeper
- Dorothy Kirsten (1910–1992), American opera singer
- Frik Kirsten (born 1988), South African rugby union footballer
- Gary Kirsten (born 1967), South African cricket coach and former player, half-brother of Peter Kirsten
- Jannes Kirsten (born 1993), South African rugby union footballer
- Noel Kirsten (1925–1986), South African cricketer, father of Gary, Paul and Peter Kirsten
- Odine Kirsten (born 1994), South African cricketer
- Paul Kirsten (born 1969), South African cricketer, brother of Gary Kirsten and half-brother of Peter Kirsten
- Peter Kirsten (born 1955), South African cricketer
- Ralf Kirsten (1930–1998), German film director and screenwriter
- Ulf Kirsten (born 1965), German footballer
- Werner H. Kirsten (1925—1992), German pathologist and cancer researcher
- Wulf Kirsten (1934–2022), German poet, novelist and writer

== Fictional characters ==
- Cameron Kirsten, in the American soap opera The Young and the Restless
