= Stephan Kirste =

German jurist

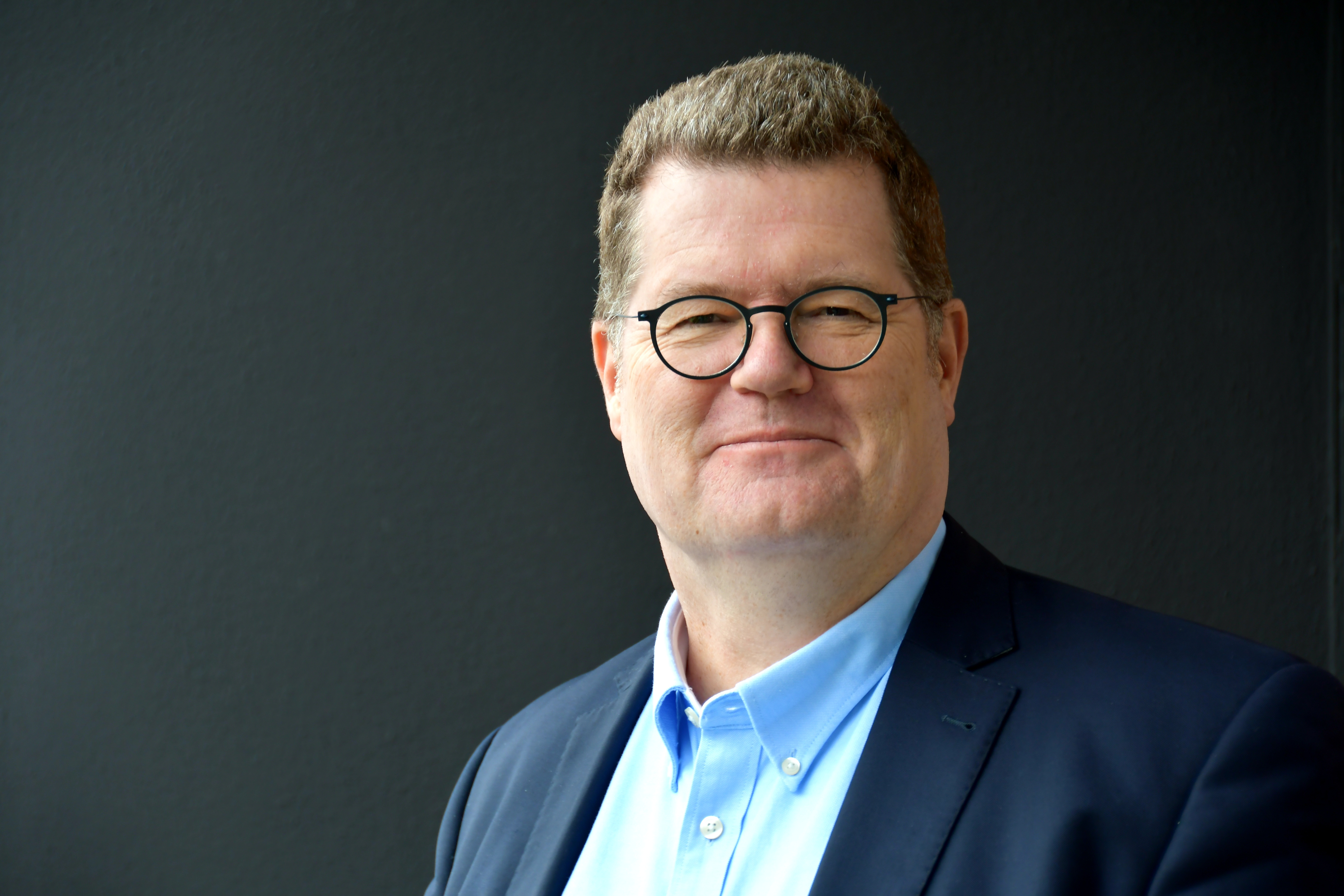
Stephan Kirste (2020)

Stephan Kirste (born November 12, 1962, in Oldenburg, Federal Republic of Germany) is a German legal scholar and university professor of legal and social philosophy at the Faculty of Law of the University of Salzburg (Austria). Since 2020, Kirste is also an associate professor (Professor Colaborador) at the Pontifícia Universidade Católica do Rio Grande do Sul (Brazil) in the graduate program.

== Life and education ==
After graduating from high school, Kirste studied law at the University of Regensburg and modern history and philosophy at the University of Freiburg in Breisgau until 1990. In 1994, Kirste finished his legal studies with the Second State Examination in Law.

Kirste had already been working as a research assistant at the University of Freiburg and at the University of Jena since completing his law studies. In Freiburg, Kirste received his doctorate in 1997 with a dissertation in legal philosophy on the topic of "The Temporality of Positive Law and the Historicality of Legal Consciousness". Following his doctorate, Kirste continued his work as a research assistant and later as a research fellow at the University of Heidelberg at the chair of Winfried Brugger. In 2004, he completed his habilitation there on the basis of a book on independent public agencies. The law faculty of the University of Heidelberg awarded him the venia legendi for public law, philosophy of law, modern constitutional history and sociology of law. He then worked as a university lecturer at the University of Heidelberg and guest professor at various German universities.

In 2009, he was offered a professorship for Public Law, European Law and Philosophy of Law at Andrássy University Budapest, where he has continued to serve on the University Council since 2018. Kirste has been a full university professor at the University of Salzburg since March 2012. He has repeatedly been a visiting professor at universities in Brazil and the USA.

Kirste is co-founder of the Working Group on the History of Ideas in the German Section of the International Association for Philosophy of Law and State. Between 2010 and 2018, Kirste was president of this section. Since 2011, he has been a member of the Advisory Board of the European Academy for Legal Theory. He is also a member of the Ethics Committees of the University of Salzburg and the State of Salzburg.

Kirste's main research interests within the philosophy of law and social philosophy lie in the need and conditions for an interdisciplinary research in jurisprudence. He has contributed to legal theory, among others, with studies on the concept and validity and the temporality of law. In the field of the ethics of law, he analyses the connection between justice, human dignity, freedom and the common good. In medical ethics, he has pointed out various dangers to human self-determination, especially through the various varieties of legal paternalism. His most important publishing project is the Encyclopedia for the Philosophy of Law and Social Philosophy, which he publishes together with Mortimer Sellers as co-editors in chief on behalf of the German Section of the International Association for Philosophy of Law and State.

== Selected publications ==
- Die Zeitlichkeit des positiven Rechts und die Geschichtlichkeit des Rechtsbewußtseins. Duncker & Humblot, Berlin 1998, ISBN 3-428-09318-6
- Einführung in die Rechtsphilosophie. Wissenschaftliche Buchgesellschaft, Darmstadt 2010, ISBN 978-3-534-20588-2
- Theorie der Körperschaft des öffentlichen Rechts – verwaltungsgeschichtliche, organisationstheoretische und verwaltungsorganisationsrechtliche Aspekte. heiBOOKS, Heidelberg 2017, ISBN 978-3-946531-62-3
- Introdução à Filosofia do Direito. 2. Auflage, Editora D'Plácido, Belo Horizonte 2018, ISBN 978-85-60519-32-3
- Rechtsphilosophie: Einführung. Academia Verlag, Baden-Baden 2020, ISBN 978-3-89665-877-7
- Legal Validity and Soft Law. Ed. by S. Kirste, P. Westerman, J. Haage, A. R. Mackor. Heidelberg, New York 2018, Springer International, ISBN 978-3-319-77522-7
- Encyclopedia of the Philosophy of Law and Social Philosophy. Ed. by M. Sellers and S. Kirste, Dordrecht 2020, Springer Netherlands, ISBN 978-94-007-6730-0
