= Kirstin =

Kirstin is a feminine given name. Notable people with the name include:

- Kirstin Cole, currently the consumer reporter for WCBS-TV (CBS 2) in New York City
- Kirstin Freye (born 1975), German tennis player
- Kirstin Gove (born 1973), former Scottish broadcast journalist and presenter
- Kirstin Jean Lewis (born 1975), South African archer
- Kirstin Lawton (born 1980), British trampolinist
- Kirstin Maldonado (born 1992), American singer-songwriter, member of the a cappella group Pentatonix
- Kirstin Marcon, New Zealand screenwriter and film director
- Kirstin Matthews, Fellow in Science and Technology Policy at the James A. Baker III Institute for Public Policy
- Kirstin Normand (born 1974), Canadian competitor in synchronized swimming and Olympic medalist

== See also ==
- Kartanonherra ja kaunis Kirstin (Finnish: The Lord of the Mansion and the Beautiful Kirstin), a historical novel by Finnish author Kaari Utrio
