= Kersti =

- Gender: Female
- Language: Estonian
- Name day: 24 July

Origin
- Region of origin: Estonia

Kersti is mainly an Estonian feminine given name.

People named Kersti include:

- Kersti Bergroth (1886–1975), Finnish author and playwright
- Kersti Börjars (born 1960), Swedish linguistics scholar
- Kersti Heinloo (born 1976), Estonian actress
- Kersti Juva (born 1948), Finnish translator
- Kersti Kreismann (born 1947), Estonian actress
- Kersti Kaljulaid (born 1969), Estonian politician, fifth President of Estonia
- Kersti Merilaas (1913–1986), Estonian poet and translator
- Kersti Sarapuu (born 1954), Estonian politician

Fictional characters named Kersti include:

- Kersti, Mario's main companion in the 2012 video game Paper Mario: Sticker Star
