= Kirsty Jones =

Welsh kitesurfer

Personal information
- Full name: Kirsty Jones
- Nationality: Welsh

Sport
- Country: Wales
- Sport: Kitesurfing
- Team: [BWSURF, OCEAN VAGABOND, ION CLUB DAKHLA]

Kirsty Jones is a Welsh professional kitesurfer and pioneer in the sport of kitesurfing. She is a three-time British Kitesurf Champion, three-time Kitesurf World Wave Champion, and two-time Master of the Ocean Champion, and holds world records in long distance and solo kitesurf crossings.

== Life ==
Jones was born in Carmarthenshire, she made headlines in 2002 when she was the first kitesurfer to cross the Irish Sea, in a charity solo event raising over £5,000 for the Ty Hafan Children's Hospice near Cardiff.

She first became UK Women's champion in 2002, and won the PKRA World Championship at the final 2008 event in Essaouira, Morocco.

She is sponsored by Animal, BWSURF, SUSO and SDF.

== Trophies ==
=== Results of Kitesurf 2009 ===
Kitesurfing World Champion 2009

Master of the Ocean Champion

=== Results of Kitesurf 2008 ===
World Champion Kitesurf Wave

World Cup KPWT Wave Masters - Brazil - 1st

World Cup KPWT Wave Masters - France - 1st

World Cup KPWT - France - 1st

KPWT World Cup World Cup - Germany 1st

=== Results of kitesurf 2007 ===
Ladies British Kitesurfing Wave Champion

1st-Kitesurfing Wave Masters World Cup - Morocco

1st Kitesurfing World Cup - Portugal

=== Results of kitesurfing 2006 ===
1st - World Cup KPWT Wave Masters - Portugal

First crossing of Kitesurf in Charité Solo-Canary Islands in Morocco.

X-Fest Boarder Kitesurf Cross - 1st Lady

Ladies British Kitesurfing Wave Champion

=== Results of Kitesurf 2005 ===
Las Tres Islas (Quadrilateral Challenge of the Three Islands - 1st Lady

Red Bull Master of the Ocean Champion - Dominican Republic

Mondial Du Vent - International Kitesurfing Competition - 2nd Lady

Kitesurfing World Wave Champion - PKR - Brazil

=== Results of Kitesurf 2004 ===
PKRA Kiteboarding Coupé du Monde - Belgium - 2nd Lady

Beach Surf Competition

British Kite Board Tour - 1st Lady

Jinx Jam Contest - Senegal Africa - 1st Lady

=== Results of Kitesurf 2003 ===
British Kitesurfing Champion

British Kite-Board Tour Champion

=== Results of Kitesurf 2002 ===
First person forever Kitesurf from Ireland to Wales, Solo for charity.

=== Results of Kitesurf 2001 ===
British Kitesurfing Champion

Pro World Kite-board - Cornwall - 1st Lady

Windfest Contest Animal-Poole - 1st Lady
