= Kirsteen Tinto =

Glaciologist in New Zealand

Kirsteen J. Tinto
- Education: University of Otago
- Scientific career
- Fields: Glaciology, Marine Geology, and Geophysics
- Workplaces: Lamont–Doherty Earth Observatory of Columbia University
- Website: https://www.ldeo.columbia.edu/user/tinto

Kirsteen Jane Tinto is a glaciologist known for her research on the behavior and subglacial geology of the Greenland and Antarctic ice sheets.

== Early life and education ==
Kirsteen Tinto spent a lot of time outdoors in her childhood as she grew up hiking and camping. In high school she studied the sciences and was able to connect her passions in college later in life as a field researcher. In 2010, Tinto earned her Geology PhD at the University of Otago in New Zealand. Her thesis is "A geophysical investigation of the Marshall Paraconformity in South Canterbury, New Zealand" with academic advisors Andrew R Gorman and Gary S Wilson.

== Career and research ==
Tinto works at the Lamont–Doherty Earth Observatory of Columbia University in Palisades, NY as an Associate Research Professor, Marine Geology and Geophysics. She is a member of the university's polar geophysics group that maps and analyses ice sheets to understand global processes and develop mathematical models. Tinto has been involved in several Lamont–Doherty Earth Observatory projects, such as GAMBIT: Gamburtsev Aerogeophysical Mapping Of Bedrock And Ice Targets, ICE Bridge, and ROSETTA: Decoding ice, ocean and tectonic mysteries of the Ross Ice Shelf. GAMBIT's mission is to explore and understand the Gamburtsev Subglacial Mountains and the overlying ice sheets in East Antarctica and Ice Bridge studies the Antarctic ice sheet to predict sea level rise. ROSETTA focuses on how the Ross Ice Sheet in Antarctica interacts with the ocean and the underlying ocean bed structure in order to predict change in the ice sheet due to climate change.

Tinto has been the principal investigator of multiple Columbia University research projects, such as "High-Resolution Gravity for Thwaites Glacier". She led the airborne geophysical survey field expeditions for the ROSETTA-Ice project. Her research has led to new understandings of the behavior of ice sheets in Antarctica and Greenland and how these polar regions interact with the global climate system. Her work includes studying ocean circulation, investigating how warm ocean water destabilizes ice sheets, and mapping ice sheets and geological formations. Dr. Tinto is author of a number of academic publications.

Tinto served on the 2019 TAM Science Transantarctic Mountain Science Planning Committee and in 2013, the play Don't Be Sad, Flying Ace! & Field Trip: A Climate Cabaret in New York City was inspired by the work of Tinto and fellow female climate scientists.

== Grants ==
- Tinto has received research funding from the National Science Foundation.

== Publications ==
- Tankersley, M.D., Horgan, H.J., Siddoway, C.S., Caratori Tontini, F. and Tinto, K., Basement topography and sediment thickness beneath Antarctica's Ross Ice Shelf (2022). https://doi.org/10.1002/essoar.10509277.2
- Tinto, K., Padman, L., Siddoway, C.S., Springer, S., Fricker, H.A., Das, I., Caratori Tontini, F., Porter, D.F., Frearson, N. P., Howard, S.L., Siegfried, M., Mosbeux, C., Becker, M., Bertinato, C., Bell, R.B. and ROSETTA-Ice team Ross Ice Shelf response to climate driven by the tectonic imprint on seafloor bathymetry (2019). https://doi.org/10.1038/s41561-019-0370-2
- Porter, D., Tinto, K., Boghosian, A. et al. Identifying Spatial Variability in Greenland's Outlet Glacier Response to Ocean Heat. Columbia University: Academic Commons (2018). https://doi.org/10.3389/feart.2018.00090
- Bell, R., Tinto, K., Das, I. et al. Deformation, warming and softening of Greenland's ice by refreezing meltwater. Nature Geosci 7, 497–502 (2014). https://doi.org/10.1038/ngeo2179
- Cochran, J., Tinto, K., Bell, R. Abbot Ice Shelf, structure of the Amundsen Sea continental margin and the southern boundary of the Bellingshausen Plate seaward of West Antarctica. AGU 16, 1421-1438 (2015). https://doi.org/10.1002/2014GC005570
- Tinto, K., Bell, R., Cochran, J. et al. Bathymetry in Petermann fjord from Operation IceBridge aerogravity. ELSEVIER 422, 58-66 (2015). https://doi.org/10.1016/j.epsl.2015.04.009
- Porter, D., Tinto, K., Boghosian, A. et al. Bathymetric control of tidewater glacier mass loss in northwest Greenland. ELSEVIER 401, 40-46 (2014). https://doi.org/10.1016/j.epsl.2014.05.058
