= Kirstin Cole =

American television news anchor

Kirstin Cole has been a reporter and anchor for PIX 11 news since 2011, where she is also a discussion panelist. She worked there from 2000-2001 before spending 10 years as the consumer reporter for CBS 2. She has received awards in crime reporting working at both companies. Her work for CBS included covering restaurants who discriminated against children.

In 2015 she hosted the Regional Economic Development Council Awards as the mistress of ceremonies.

== Awards ==
She won four New York Emmy Awards:

- 2005 in crime programming
- 2015 in crime
- 2016 in news excellence and news special
