= Kirsti Eskelinen =

Kirsti Eskelinen-Liukkonen was an Ambassador of Finland to Ankara from 2008 to 2012. She was the Finnish Ambassador to Latvia in Riga from 2000 to 2004 and after that she was head of the Eastern Department of the Ministry of Foreign Affairs until 2008. She started with the Ministry for Foreign Affairs in 1973.

Eskelinen has served as Minister at the Finnish Embassy in London and as Director of Multilateral Development Cooperation at the Ministry for Foreign Affairs. She has worked in various positions at the Ministry of Foreign Affairs's Political, Trade and Development Department and at the United Nations Permanent Representations in New York and Geneva.Between 1986 and 1989 she served as Head of the Finnish Red Cross International Department.
