= Kirsteen =

Kirsteen is a feminine given name. Notable people with the name include:

- Kirsteen Kim (born 1959), British theologian
- Kirsteen MacDonald (born 1982), Scottish broadcaster
- Kirsteen Mackay, 21st century British architect
- Kirsteen McEwan (born 1975), Scottish retired badminton player
- Kirsteen O'Sullivan (born 1979), Scottish broadcaster
- Kirsteen Sullivan, British politician elected to Parliament in 2024
- Kirsteen Tinto, 21st century New Zealand glaciologist
- Kirsty Wark (born 1955), Scottish television presenter and journalist
