= Kirstine Roepstorff =

Danish visual artist (born 1972)

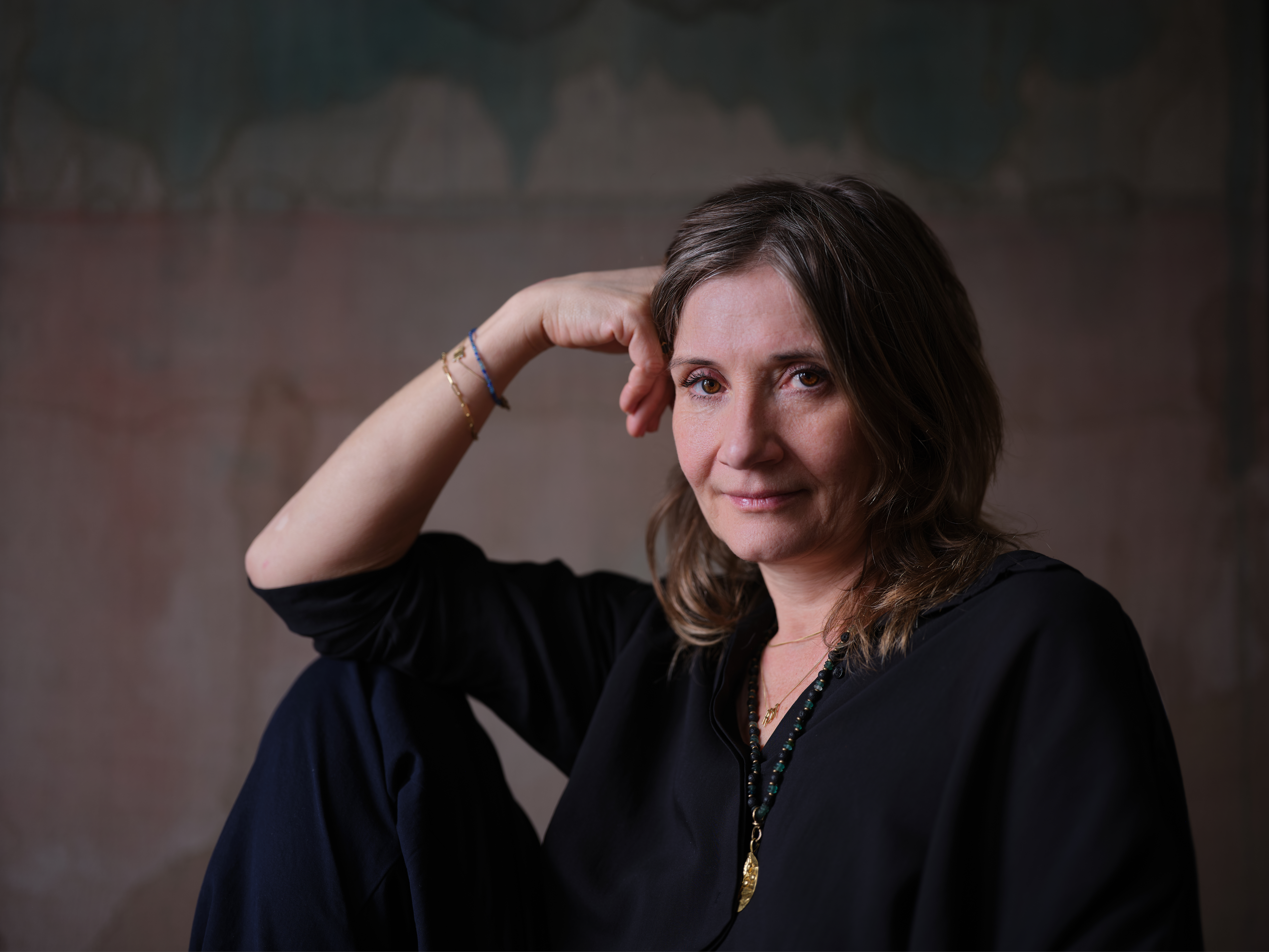
- Born: 1972 (age 53–54); Copenhagen, Denmark
- Education: Royal Danish Academy of Fine Arts, Rutgers University
- Notable work: 57th Venice Biennale

Kirstine Roepstorff (born 1972) is a Danish multidisciplinary artist known for her work in collage, sculpture, and installation. Her practice explores the "in-between" spaces of the human experience, focusing on themes of darkness, the subconscious, and transformation. Roepstorff examines how history, politics, and spirituality shape our understanding of identity and reality, often revisiting ancient techniques to challenge modern systems. Roepstorff has exhibited widely, including representing Denmark at the 57th International Art Exhibition in Venice in 2017 and presenting a major solo exhibition, Renaissance of the Night, at Kunsthal Charlottenborg in 2018. She holds an MFA from the Royal Danish Academy of Fine Arts and Rutgers University, Mason School of Fine Art, has received several notable awards, including the Eckersberg Medal and the Ny Carlsberg Foundation Art Prize.

== Life and work ==
Kirstine Roepstorff was born in Virum in 1972, and grew up in Copenhagen and Fredericia, Denmark.

From 1994 to 2001, she was a student at the Royal Danish Academy of Fine Arts and affiliated with Claus Carstensen’s painting school. During her studies, she became part of the artist collective Kørners Kontor, alongside John Kørner, Tal R and Kasper Bonnén. The artists took an ironic and critical stance towards the genres, traditions, and ways of describing art and artists in art history. Among the key events they were involved in were Street Sharks (1999), Standardrum (2001), and Ambassaden (2000).

In 1997, Roepstorff co-founded the feminist artist group Kvinder på Værtshus with artists Åsa Sonjasdotter, Andrea Creutz, and Lisa Strömbeck. The group was later expanded to include members Nanna Debois Buhl, Nynne Haugaard, Katya Sander, Marika Seidler, and Christina Prip. Among their most well-known actions was Sexogpenge, where the group mapped and wrote interpretive comments on billboard advertisements in Copenhagen and distributed flyers with a link to the website sexogpenge.dk, a guide to products using sexist advertising in their marketing. In 2000, they also presented the work Herstories Tour, where the group organized canal tours in Copenhagen, focusing on women and female topics, such as Amagerkonerne at Grønttorvet.

In 2000, Roepstorff completed an MFA at Rutgers University, Mason School of Fine Art in the USA. In 2001, she moved to Berlin to live and work. She returned to Denmark in 2015, and lives and works outside Fredericia.

In 2011, Roepstorff was commissioned to create the poster for Copenhagen Jazz Festival.

In 2015, Kirstine Roepstorff created a three-ton tubular bronze bell installed at DOKK1, a harbor center in Aarhus. The bell, engraved with a rising sun and infinity symbol, is connected to Aarhus University Hospital, 16 km away, allowing new parents to celebrate their baby's birth by activating the sound. Visitors can touch the bell, feeling its vibrations as a reminder of the energy and new beginnings each birth brings. The installation serves as both an artistic piece and a symbol of interconnectedness, reflecting the cycle of life and the community.

In 2017, Roepstorff was selected to represent Denmark at the 57th Venice Biennale. For the Danish Pavilion, she developed the exhibition project Influenza: Theatre of Glowing Darkness which explored the metamorphosis that occurs between the destruction of the known and the embrace of the new. Through a dynamic interplay of light, darkness, and sculptural interventions, Roepstorff created an immersive environment that invited viewers to reflect on the process of transformation, disruption, and renewal. The work aimed to encourage a relearning of our perceptions and responses to change, emphasizing the necessity of evolving in the face of uncertainty and the unknown.

In 2018, the largest presentation of her work in Denmark was shown at Kunsthal Charlottenborg with the title "Renaissance of the Night." Curated by Aukje Lepoutre Ravn, it included Roepstorff's Influenza: Theatre of Glowing Darkness in a new format, along with the tapestry Renaissance of the Night. The exhibition included 75 artworks across various media, including painting, collage, relief, mobile, and sculpture, showcasing both new and previously created pieces. The exhibition, structured as a journey from dusk to dawn, took place in the south wing of Kunsthal Charlottenborg. Roepstorff examined darkness, its cultural associations, and its potential as a transformative force rather than something to avoid. She presented darkness not only as the absence of light but also as connected to the human psyche, sleep, death, and the subconscious. While it could symbolize fear and uncertainty, it was also the origin of all life in a world dominated by artificial light, where darkness was often linked to the unknown.

Roepstorff created the scenography for the solo exhibition Solo: Rita Kernn-Larsen at Gl. Holtegaard, which highlighted the work of the Danish surrealist Rita Kernn-Larsen (1904–1998). The exhibition presented over 100 works, including paintings, collages, sketches, and ceramics, spanning from the 1920s to the 1980s. Roepstorff's artistic interventions helped bring Kernn-Larsen's body of work into contemporary focus, offering a fresh perspective on the artist's lifelong contributions.

In 2018, Roepstorff's solo exhibition Edicius og Lilith at Trapholt Museum featured a variety of immersive installations, sculptures, and collages, exploring the fluidity of boundaries and the transformation of personal and collective experiences. Roepstorff's work combined visual beauty with critical commentary, challenging traditional norms and encouraging reflection on the relationship between the individual and society. A central theme in the exhibition was the relationship between the two genders, represented by Edicius and Lilith. The biblical figure Lilith (the night witch) symbolized the primal feminine forces for Roepstorff, while her own figure, "Edicius," represented a new form of sensitive and poetically charged masculinity she observed in the world. When "Edicius" was spelled in reverse, it formed the word "Suicide," symbolizing the need for men to reject the caricature of traditional masculinity in order to make way for a new, fertile era. Roepstorff created the monumental tapestry Himmelfrø, which spanned 45 square meters and resembled a celestial vault. The exhibition was accompanied by the music Für Alina by Arvo Pärt.

In 2023, Roepstorff participated in the exhibition Waden Tide with her sculpture Mosaic Eye at Denmark's westernmost point, Blåvandshuk. Inspired by the Fresnel lens of Blåvandshuk Lighthouse, the work explored sand as a material and resource that continually shapes the landscape. Part of the group show First There Is A Mountain, the exhibition highlighted sand's profound impact on both nature and civilization, inviting reflection on its often unseen role in shaping the world.

In 2024, Roepstorff was invited to be part of Frieze Sculpture Park, curated by Fatoş Üstek, with her sculpture Lightning Rod. Inspired by Regent's Park as a site of connection and convergence, the work is composed of cast bronze forms and natural stones. It explores a shift in our understanding of energy, how it can be captured, stored, transformed, and applied for both destruction and creation. Part of Roepstorff's ongoing project Earth School, the sculpture delves into the concept of ‘inner technology’ and the invisible aspects of existence.

To celebrate Koldinghus' 750th anniversary, the Ny Carlsberg Foundation has commissioned four Danish artists, Bjørn Nørgaard, Tal R, Alexander Tovborg, and Kirstine Roepstorff, to design 16 tapestries in collaboration with Manufacture des Gobelins. The project, expected to be completed in 2027, will include a 108 m^{2} tapestry, including four large pieces measuring 3 x 6 meters and twelve smaller entre fenêtres (window pieces) measuring 0.8 x 2.8 meters. Her work 'Grænseland' is an exploration of borders in all their forms: territorial, spiritual, cosmic, and human. Much like a medieval altarpiece, it depicts an apocalyptic landscape where the moon forms a sacred dome, guiding the eye through a dark narrative inspired by Hieronymus Bosch. A split mountain rises from the stormy sea, with a woman whose dress merges with the ocean's depths. On each side of the sea, fortress walls divide two worlds: on the left, a brutal world where humanity wrestles with its primal instincts; on the right, a collapsed civilization reclaimed by nature. Beneath it all, sound waves pulse with the rhythm of the Earth, while a woman in a bubble keeps the music alive—delicate hope for the future.

== Artistic style ==
Roepstorff's basis is collages incorporating media images that visualize existing power relations and critically deal with the history and failures of political ideas. By editing and decomposing the original material her works generate new contexts that open up spaces for negotiation and new narratives. The collages are often large using different materials like fabrics, photocopies, cuttings, foils, brass, wood and paper. In the past 5–6 years Roepstorff has broadened her collage practice by incorporating sculptural elements into her work creating new visual and bodily engaging experiences. Her sculptures have mainly been made of concrete and brass.

Balance is a key word for Roepstorff. Her works are often composed around horizontal lines whose divisions reflect different layers of consciousness. This is especially seen in her brass mobiles which Roepstorff denotes ‘Klangmennesker’ (Sound people) – "We're some kind of vibrational beings that are walking around, sometimes in unison, sometimes not. Whether we are able to go in harmony with our surroundings is very much about how our own inner sound is tuned."

== Exhibitions ==
=== Solo exhibitions ===
2025	Neptune Lab 29°, Vejle Kunstmuseum, Vejle, Denmark
2023	Earth School Classroom, Gallery 2112, Copenhagen, Denmark
2022	G(r)ain, Kunsthal Aarhus, Aarhus, Denmark
2019	Ex Cave, Museum Haus Konstruktiv, Zurich, Switzerland
2018	Renaissance of the Night, Kunsthal Charlottenborg, Copenhagen, Denmark Edicius & Lilith, Trapholt Museum for Moderne Kunst, Kolding, Denmark
2017	Influenza: Theatre of Glowing Darkness, 57th Bienniale di Venezia, Venice, Italy
2016	Rehearsing Volume, Andersen's Contemporary, Copenhagen, Denmark
2014	When You Light a Lantern in the Summer Night Many Strange Things Come Flying, Kunstverein Göttingen, Göttingen, Germany Mother Of Time Showing Her Fruits, The Danish Cultural Institute, Edinburgh, Scotland
2013	Walking Beside Time, Kunstpalais Erlangen, Erlangen, Germany
2012	Structures, Pippy Houldsworth Gallery, London, United Kingdom When a Drop Unite, Patricia Low Contemporary, Saanen, Switzerland
2011	Wunderkammer of Formlessness, Museum of Contemporary Art, Oslo, Norway
2010	Dried Dew Drops: Wunderkammer of Formlessness, Museum für Gegenwartskunst, Basel, Switzerland Illuminating Shadows, Peres Projects, Berlin, Germany Illuminating Shadows, Galerie im Taxispalais, Innsbruck, Austria Illuminating Shadows,; Stadtgalerie, Schwaz, Austria
2009	Nuit: Sun Forms of Beneath, Kunsthallen Brandts, Odense, Denmark The Inner Sound that Kills the Outer, MUSAC, Leon, Spain Rainbows, Galleri Christina Wilson, Copenhagen, Denmark
2008	Rocks, Patricia Low, Gstaad, Switzerland
2007	It’s Not the Eye of the Needle That Changed – The Self, Peres Projects, Los Angeles, United States It’s Not the Eye of the Needle That Changed – The Time, MoMA, Drawing Center, New York, United States
2006	A Handful of Once, Peres Projects, Berlin, Germany A Handful of Once, Arnolfini, Bristol, United Kingdom
2004	King of Crash and the Untouchables, Lonsdale Gallery, Toronto, Canada 1 1/2, LA PIX, Peres Projects, Los Angeles, United States The Queen of Diamonds, Galleri Christina Wilson, Copenhagen, Denmark

=== Group exhibitions ===
2024	When You Lose Control, Glas, Museum of Glass Art, Ebeltoft, Denmark Lightning Rod and Earth School, Frieze Sculpture Park, Regent's Park, London, United Kingdom Cosmic Connection, Galerie Møller Witt, Copenhagen, Denmark
2023	First There Is A Mountain, Wadden Tide, Blåvand, Denmark Ej Blot til Lyst, Gallery 2112, Copenhagen, Denmark
2022	New Works, Gallery 2112, Copenhagen, Denmark
2021	Eye of the Huntress, Banja Rathnov Galleri, Copenhagen, Denmark
2019	Ocean Dwellers, Nordic Embassies, Berlin, Germany The King is Dead, Cermak Eisenkraft, Prague, Czech Republic
2017-18	Samtidskunst på Hospitaler, KØS Museum of Public Art, Køge, Denmark Cool, Calm, Collected, ARoS Aarhus Art Museum, Aarhus, Denmark Teser, The Round Tower, Copenhagen, Denmark (travelling exhibition: Stiftung Christliche Kunst Wittenberg, Wittenberg, Germany)
2016	Variation in Scandinavian Abstractions, Galleri Brandstrup, Oslo, Norway
2015	Poor Art - Rich Legacy. Arte Povera and Parallel Practices 1968–2015, National Museum of Art, Oslo, Norway The Essential Bruce Springsteen, Andersen's Contemporary, Copenhagen, Denmark Efterklang / Reverberations, Röda Sten Konsthall, Gothenburg, Sweden Moon Skin Lucid Walk, Den Frie Udstillingsbygning, Copenhagen, Denmark Grønningen 100th Anniversary Exhibition, Museumsbygningen, Copenhagen, Denmark
2014	Avantgarde Mecanique, Galleri Tom Christoffersen, Copenhagen, Denmark Coming From, Overgaden Institute of Contemporary Art, Copenhagen, Denmark
2013	Metaphysik der Disziplin, Tschechisches Zentrum Berlin, Berlin, Germany Spiel der Throne, Humboldt Lab, Ethnographisches Museum Dahlem, Staatliche Museen, Berlin, Germany Screen & Décor, Justine M Barnicke Gallery, Toronto, Canada Converge, Kunsthallen Nikolaj, Copenhagen, Denmark Enten Eller / Entweder Oder, Haus am Waldsee, Berlin, Germany Super 100 – 100 Super Works of Art from the Collection, HEART Herning Museum of Contemporary Art, Herning, Denmark
2012	13.0.0.0.0., RH Gallery, New York, United States Keine Zeit Erschöpftes Selbst/ Entgrenztes Können, 21er Haus, Belvedere, Vienna, Austria
2011	Gesamtkunstwerk: New Art from Germany, Saatchi Gallery, London, United Kingdom You are Free, Kunsthalle Exnergasse WUK, Vienna, Austria Berlin 2000-2011: Playing among the Ruins, Museum of Contemporary Art Tokyo, Tokyo, Japan The Art of This Century, Museum Alex Mylona - Macedonian Museum of Contemporary Art, Athens, Greece The Human Pattern, Kunsthall Oslo, Oslo, Norway
2010	The Library of Babel / In and Out of Place, Zabludowicz Collection, London, United Kingdom Connexions, Esbjerg Art Museum, Esbjerg, Denmark Scene Shifts, Bonniers Konsthall, Stockholm, Sweden The Third Meaning, RH Gallery, New York, United States Third Thoughts, Centro Cultural Andratx, CCA, Andratx, Spain The 5th Anniversary Exhibition, Patricia Low Contemporary, Geneva, Switzerland
2009	Berlin - Los Angeles. A Tale of Two (Other) Cities, Galleria Massimo De Carlo, Milan, Italy Minneapolis, Peres Projects, Los Angeles, United States
2008	U-Turn, Quadrennial for Contemporary Art, Copenhagen, Denmark Eurasia. Geographic Cross-Overs in Art, Museo di Arte Moderna e Contemporanea di Trento e Rovereto, Trento, Italy Home is the Place you Left, Trondheim Museum of Arts, Trondheim, Norway Personal Protocols and Other Preferences, Bard College, Annandale-on-Hudson, New York, United States The End Was Yesterday - Part II, Kunstraum Innsbruck, Innsbruck, Austria. Danskjävlar – en svensk kærlighedserklæring, Kunsthal Charlottenborg, Copenhagen, Denmark La Maison Jaune: Works on Paper, Patricia Low Contemporary, Gstaad, Switzerland
2007	Fit to Print - Printed Media in Recent Collage, Gagosian Gallery, New York, United States Star of Africa, Patricia Low Contemporary, Geneva, Switzerland
2006	Gold Diggers!, Patricia Low Contemporary, Gstaad, Switzerland

== Public artworks ==
She has completed significant public art projects, including Horizons and Moons in Alserkal Avenue, Dubai, The Galactic Community Park at Aalborg University (DK), Bib Au Natura in Randers (DK), Three Paradoxes–Three Medicine Balls–Three Forces in Buddinge (DK), Cosmic Dance in Fjellhamar (NO), Hydra in Fredericia (DK), The Heart of the Whale in Middelfart (DK), Untitled at Lillebælt Hospital (DK), Gong at DOKK1 Public Library in Aarhus (DK), and Klangfrø at the University of Copenhagen (DK).

== Collections ==
Her work is held in permanent collections worldwide, including MoMA - Museum of Modern Art (US), The Saatchi Gallery (UK), The National Museum of Art, Architecture and Design (NO), Woods Art Institute (DE), Statens Museum for Kunst (DK), Arken Museum of Modern Art (DK), HEART, Herning Museum of Contemporary Art (DK), Ny Carlsberg Foundation (DK) and the Danish Art Foundation (DK), Trapholt Museum of Modern Art (DK), The Sainsbury Centre (UK), Reydan Weiss Collection (DE) among others.

== Awards ==
- 2015: Art Prize, Ny Carlsberg Foundation, Denmark
- 2014: The Eckersberg Medal, The Royal Danish Academy of Fine Arts, Denmark
- 2014: Ole Haslunds Kunstnerfond, Denmark
- 2012; Sven Hols’ Legat, Akademiraadet, Denmark
- 2007: Zartmanns Legat, The Danish Arts Foundation, Denmark

== Publications and catalogues ==
- The Archive of Dark, In Other Words, London, United Kingdom, 2021 ISBN 1916002471
- Common Cold, CMMN CLD, König Buchverlag, Berlin, Germany, 2017 ISBN 978-3960981794
- Horizons of the Moving Mind, Kunstverein Göttingen, Argobooks, Berlin, Germany, 2014 ISBN 978-3-942700-58-0
- Walking Beside Time, Kunstpalais Erlangen, Kerber Verlag, Bielefeld, Germany, 2014 ISBN 978-3-86678-948-7
- Dried Dew Drops: Wunderkammer of Formlessness, Museum für Gegenwartskunst, Basel, Switzerland, 2010 ISBN 3775727485
- Illuminating Shadows, Stadtgalerie Schwarz, Düsseldorf, Germany, 2010
- Nuit: Sun Forms of Beneath, Kunsthallen Brandts, Odense, Denmark, 2009 ISBN 87-7766-077-3
- The Inner Sound that Kills the Outer, Museum of Contemporary Art (MUSAC), JRP Ringier, Leon, France, 2008 ISBN 978-3-03764-025-8

== See also ==
- List of Danish women artists
- 57th Venice Biennale
