= List of storms named Kirsten =

The names Kirsten and Kristen have been used for three tropical cyclones in the Eastern Pacific Ocean:

- Tropical Storm Kirsten (1966) – made two landfalls in Mexico, causing eight fatalities.
- Tropical Storm Kristen (1970)
- Hurricane Kirsten (1974) – a Category 1 hurricane.
