= Kirsten (given name) =

- Pronunciation: /kirstɪn/ KER-stin, /ˈkɪərstən/ KEERST-ən
- Gender: Female

Origin
- Origin: Scandinavian (via Greek)
- Meaning: follower of Christ/the anointed/walks with God

Other names
- Related names: Kiersten, Kjirsten, Kerstin, Kjersti, Kersti, Kirsten, Kirstin

Kirsten is a Scandinavian form of the name Christina.

== Music ==
- Kirsten Flagstad (1895–1962), Norwegian opera singer
- Kirsten Rosenberg, American rock/metal singer

== Politics ==
- Kirsten Engel, American attorney and elected representative
- Kirsten Gillibrand (born 1966), American politician and lawyer, United States Senator
- Kirsten Gloerfelt-Tarp (1889–1977), Danish economist, politician, office manager and women's rights activist
- Kirsten Jacobsen (1942–2010), Danish politician
- Kirsten Livermore (born 1969), Australian politician
- Kirsten Oswald (born 1972), Scottish politician

== Sports ==
- Kirsten Barnes (born 1968), Canadian rower and Olympic champion
- Kirsten Venetta Brown (1963–2006), American slalom canoeist
- Kirsten Bruhn (born 1969), German female Paralympic swimmer
- Kirsten Flipkens, Belgian tennis player; 2003 International Tennis Federation Junior World Champion
- Kirsten Hedegaard Jensen (born 1935), Danish Olympic swimmer
- Kirsten Plum Jensen (born 1961), Danish Olympic rower
- Kirsten Moore-Towers (born 1992), Canadian pair skater
- Kirsten Olson (born 1991), American figure skater
- Kirsten Melkevik Otterbu (born 1970), Norwegian long-distance runner
- Kirsten Simms (born 2004), American ice hockey player
- Kirsten Thomson (born 1983), Australian middle-distance freestyle swimmer
- Kirsten Verbist (born 1987), Belgian figure skater

== Television and film ==
- Kirsten Bloom Allen, actress and ballet dancer
- Kirsten Bishop, voice actress best known for her roles as Zoycite and Kaori Knight in the English version of Sailor Moon
- Kirsten Bourne, actress who played the role of Tessa Campanelli in the hit Canadian television series Degrassi High
- Kirsten Dunst (born 1982), American actress of German and Swedish descent
- Kirsten Imrie (born 1967), former glamour model, actress and television presenter
- Kirsten Magasdi, award-winning British and Australian journalist, TV reporter and presenter BBC World News Channel; model and actress for Malaysia Truly Asia
- Kirsten O'Brien (born 1972), British TV presenter
- Kirsten Price (actress) (born 1981), adult film actress and reality TV star
- Kirsten Price (musician) (born 1979), English-American singer-songwriter
- Kirsten Prout (born 1990), Canadian actress, best known for ABC Family shows, Kyle XY and The Lying Game
- Kirsten Storms (born 1984), American actress
- Kirsten Vangsness (born 1972), American actress

== Other fields ==
- Kirsten Abrahamson, Canadian ceramic artist
- Kirsten Bakis (born 1967), Swiss-born author of Lives of the Monster Dogs
- Kirsten Banks, Australian astrophysicist and science communicator
- Kirsten Bibbins-Domingo, American epidemiologist and physician
- Kirsten Costas (1968–1984), American homicide victim
- Kirsten Davidson, model from Australia
- Kirsten Klein (born 1945), Danish photographer
- Kirsten Munk (1598–1658), morganatic royal consort
- Kirsten Simonsen (born 1946), Danish geographer and sociologist

== Fictional characters ==
- Kirsten Cohen, on the television series The O.C.
- Kirsten Gannon, on the Australian soap opera Neighbours
- Kirsten Larson, protagonist of American Girl's Kirsten historical series
- Princess Kirsten of Norway, in the 2006 rom-com film The Prince & Me 2: The Royal Wedding

== See also ==
- Hurricane Kirsten
- Kyrsten Sinema
