= Kirsti Lyytikäinen =

Finnish businesswomen and journalist (1926–2008)

- Born: Kirsti Keskinen; 1926
- Died: 2008 (aged 81–82); Helsinki, Finland
- Occupation: Businesspeople
- Known for: Owner of A-Lehdet

Kirsti Lyytikäinen (née: Keskinen; 1926–2008) was a Finnish businesswoman, publisher and journalist. She was one of the owners and a long-term board member of the A-Lehdet publishing company and served as the editor-in-chief of the magazines Anna and Hopepeili.

== Biography ==
She was born in 1926. Her journalist career began in 1951. She first edited Hopepeili. She was made editor-in-chief of Anna in 1963 when it was started by Apulehti which would be renamed as A-Lehdet in 1981. She designed Anna as a publication which involved in gender role discussions. She joined the board of the A-Lehdet company and served there for a long period. She was one of the owners of the company.

She was married to Olli Lyytikäinen (died 1978) who was managing director of the Apulehti company. Lyytikäinen died in Helsinki on 27 July 2008.
