= List of Finns =

This is a list of historical and living Finns (including ethnic Finns and people of full or partial Finnish ancestry) who are famous or notable.

Finland is a Nordic country located between Sweden, Norway and Russia.

== Actors and actresses ==
- Ida Aalberg (1858–1915)
- Jouko Ahola (born 1970)
- Joalin Loukamaa (born 2001)
- Olavi Ahonen (1923–2000)
- Irina Björklund (born 1973)
- Anna Easteden (born 1976)
- Samuli Edelmann (born 1968)
- Peter Franzén (born 1971)
- George Gaynes (1927–2019)
- Gina Goldberg (born 1963)
- Beat-Sofi Granqvist (1869–1960)
- Ville Haapasalo (born 1972)
- Anna-Leena Härkönen (born 1965)
- Ansa Ikonen (1913–1989)
- Anni-Kristiina Juuso (born 1979)
- Kata Kärkkäinen (born 1968)
- Krista Kosonen (born 1983)
- Marta Kristen (born 1945)
- Mikko Leppilampi (born 1978)
- Vesa-Matti Loiri (1945–2022)
- Masa Niemi (1914–1960)
- Maila "Vampira" Nurmi (1922–2008)
- Jaakko Ohtonen (born 1989)
- Kati Outinen (born 1961)
- Jasper Pääkkönen (born 1980)
- Turo Pajala (1955–2007)
- Tauno Palo (1905–1982)
- Pertti "Spede" Pasanen (1930–2001)
- Matti Pellonpää (1951–1995)
- Lasse Pöysti (1927–2019)
- Oiva Sala (1900–1980)
- Pentti Siimes (1929–2016)
- Maria Silfvan (1800–1865) – possibly Finland's first actress
- Markku Toikka (born 1955)

== Architects ==
- Aino Aalto (1894–1949)
- Alvar Aalto (1898–1976)
- Marco Casagrande (born 1971)
- Herman Gesellius (1874–1916)
- Elna Kiljander (1889–1970)
- Juha Leiviskä (1936–2023)
- Yrjö Lindegren (1900–1952)
- Armas Lindgren (1874–1929)
- Wivi Lönn (1872–1966)
- Juhani Pallasmaa (born 1936)
- Reima Pietilä (1923–1993)
- Viljo Revell (1910–1964)
- Aarno Ruusuvuori (1925–1992)
- Kerttu Rytkönen (1895–1991)
- Eero Saarinen (1910–1961)
- Eliel Saarinen (1873–1950)
- J. S. Sirén (1889–1961)
- Lars Sonck (1870–1956)
- Josef Stenbäck (1854–1929)
- Uno Ullberg (1879–1944)
- Martti Välikangas (1893–1973)

== Visual artists ==
- Erna Aaltonen (born 1951), ceramist
- Wäinö Aaltonen – sculptor (1894–1966)
- Eija-Liisa Ahtila – photographer, video artist (born 1959)
- Helena Arnell – painter (1697–1751)
- Margareta Capsia – painter (1682–1759)
- Emil Cedercreutz – sculptor (1879–1949)
- Albert Edelfelt – painter (1854–1905)
- Magnus Enckell – painter (1870–1925)
- Gunnar Finne – sculptor (1886–1952)
- Hilda Flodin – sculptor (1877–1958)
- Alina Forsman – sculptor (1845–1899)
- Akseli Gallen-Kallela – painter (1865–1931)
- Jorma Gallen-Kallela – painter (1898–1939)
- Liisa Hallamaa – ceramist (1925–2008)
- Eemil Halonen – sculptor (1875–1950)
- Pekka Halonen – painter (1865–1933)
- Edith Hammar – illustrator and cartoonist (born 1992)
- Edvin Hevonkoski – sculptor (1923–2009)
- Eila Hiltunen – sculptor (1922–2003)
- Kari Huhtamo – sculptor (1943–2023)
- Tuuli Hypén – cartoonist (born 1983)
- Tove Jansson – painter, illustrator, and cartoonist of Moomin (1914–2001)
- Viktor Jansson – sculptor (1886–1958)
- Antti Jokinen – video director in Hollywood (born 1968)
- Eero Järnefelt – painter (1863–1937)
- Ville Juurikkala – photographer (born 1980)
- Rudolf Koivu – illustrator (1890–1946)
- Mauri Kunnas (born 1950)
- Touko Laaksonen (Tom of Finland) – fetish artist (1920–1991)
- Kari T. Leppänen – cartoonist (born 1945)
- Sven Lokka – painter and writer (1924-2008)
- Otto Maja – graffiti artist (born 1987)
- Totte Mannes – painter (born 1933)
- Arno Rafael Minkkinen – photographer
- Helvi Mustonen – painter (1947–2025)
- Kalervo Palsa – painter (1947–1987)
- Tuulikki Pietilä – graphic artist (1917–2009)
- Walter Runeberg – sculptor (1838–1920)
- Sampsa – painter and street artist
- Helene Schjerfbeck – painter (1862–1946)
- Hugo Simberg – painter (1873–1917)
- Venny Soldan-Brofeldt – painter (1863–1945)
- Kaj Stenvall – painter (born 1951)
- Kari Suomalainen – painter and cartoonist (1920–1999)
- Reidar Särestöniemi – painter (1925–1981)
- Kain Tapper – sculptor (1930–2004)
- Ellen Thesleff – painter (1869–1954)
- Salla Tykkä
- Ville Vallgren – sculptor (1855–1940)
- Marja Vallila – sculptor (1950–2018)

== Businesspeople ==
- Sari Baldauf – former Nokia executive
- Wilhelm Schauman – industrialist
- Jorma Eloranta – CEO of Metso (2004-2011)
- Aatos Erkko – minister, billionaire and major owner of Sanoma
- Maija-Liisa Friman (born 1952) – board member of several companies
- Harry Harkimo – businessman in ice hockey business
- Antti Herlin – chairman of the board of KONE, the richest man in Finland with assets worth over 1 billion euros in KONE stock owned through his holding companies
- Sara Hildén (1905–1993) – businesswoman and art collector
- Fredrik Idestam – industrialist and founder of Nokia
- Kari Kairamo – former CEO of Nokia (1932–1988)
- Olli-Pekka Kallasvuo – former CEO of Nokia
- Jorma Ollila – former CEO of Nokia, Chairman of Royal Dutch Shell
- Kirsti Paakkanen – former CEO of Marimekko
- Kaj-Erik Relander – businessman and investor, former CEO of Sonera (Telia Finland)
- Jaana Tuominen – CEO of Paulig (born 1960)
- Björn Wahlroos – Chairman of Sampo
- Rudolf Walden (1878–1946) – founder of United Paper Mills
- John Wickström (1870–1959) – Founder of engine factories
- Poju Zabludowicz – billionaire, philanthropist, and owner of Tamares Group

== Computer pioneers ==
- Johan Helsingius – creator and operator of The Penet remailer
- Aapo Kyrölä – creator of Sulake
- Jarkko Oikarinen – creator of Internet Relay Chat (IRC)
- Linus Torvalds – initial creator of Linux kernel
- Michael Widenius – creator of MySQL
- Tatu Ylönen – creator of SSH

== Designers ==
- Eero Rislakki
- Eero Aarnio
- Erik Bruun
- Kaj Franck
- Maija Isola
- Valto Kokko
- Stefan Lindfors
- Vuokko Nurmesniemi
- Katja Pettersson
- Timo Sarpaneva
- Esteri Tomula
- Tapio Wirkkala

== Filmmakers ==
- Zaida Bergroth (born 1977)
- Jörn Donner (1933-2020)
- Anna Eriksson (born 1977)
- Renny Harlin (born 1959)
- Klaus Härö (born 1971)
- Jalmari Helander (born 1976)
- Erkki Karu (1887–1935)
- Dome Karukoski (born 1976)
- Aki Kaurismäki (born 1957)
- Mika Kaurismäki (born 1955)
- Ere Kokkonen (1938–2008)
- Juho Kuosmanen (born 1979)
- Edvin Laine (1905–1989)
- Glory Leppänen (1901–1979)
- Aku Louhimies (born 1968)
- Auli Mantila (born 1964)
- Taru Mäkelä (born 1959)
- Mikko Niskanen (1929–1990)
- Risto Orko (1899–2001)
- Spede Pasanen (1930–2001)
- Diana Ringo (born 1992)
- Pamela Tola (born 1981)
- Teuvo Tulio (1912–2000)
- Valentin Vaala (1909–1976)
- Johanna Vuoksenmaa (born 1965)
- Timo Vuorensola (born 1979)

== Musicians ==
=== Classical ===
- Kalevi Aho – composer
- Paavo Berglund – conductor
- Linda Brava – violinist
- Mikko Franck – conductor
- Ralf Gothóni – pianist (father of Maris)
- Ilkka Kuusisto – composer
- Pekka Kuusisto – conductor, violinist, composer
- Jaakko Kuusisto – conductor, violinist, composer
- Risto Lauriala – pianist
- Hannu Lintu – conductor
- Klaus Mäkelä – conductor, cellist
- Janne Mertanen – pianist
- Olli Mustonen – pianist, composer
- Sakari Oramo – conductor
- Selim Palmgren – composer, pianist, conductor
- Jorma Panula – conductor and conducting educator pioneer
- Einojuhani Rautavaara – composer
- Herman Rechberger – composer
- Santtu-Matias Rouvali – conductor, percussionist
- Kaija Saariaho – composer
- Esa-Pekka Salonen – conductor, composer
- Jukka-Pekka Saraste – conductor
- Jean Sibelius – composer
- Dalia Stasevska – conductor
- John Storgårds – conductor
- Elina Vähälä – violinist
- Osmo Vänskä – conductor, composer, clarinetist
- Sauli Zinovjev – composer
- Diana Ringo – composer

=== Electronic ===
- Aku Raski a.k.a. Huoratron - musician, DJ and producer
- Miika Eloranta & Janne Mansnerus – musicians, producers (as Super8 & Tab)
- Paavo Siljamäki – DJ and producer; part of a Trance music group Above & Beyond
- Jori Hulkkonen – DJ, musician, producer
- Petri Kuljuntausta – composer, musician
- Erkki Kurenniemi – musician, inventor
- Lassi Lehto a.k.a. Jimi Tenor – acid jazz musician
- Lassi Nikko a.k.a. Brothomstates a.k.a. Dune – musician
- Sasu Ripatti a.k.a. Vladislav Delay – musician, DJ
- Esa Juhani Ruoho a.k.a. Lackluster – musician
- Jaakko Salovaara a.k.a. JS16 – musician, producer
- Mika Vainio – musician, member of Pan Sonic
- Ville Virtanen a.k.a. Darude
- Ilpo Väisänen – musician, member of Pan Sonic
- Heidi Kilpeläinen – multimedia artist, singer and recording artist, known by the stage name HK119
- Diana Ringo – composer

=== Folk ===
- Islaja – acid folk singer
- Konsta Jylhä – folk musician
- Maria Kalaniemi – folk music accordion player
- Sanna Kurki-Suonio – folk music singer
- Lau Nau – acid folk singer
- Gösta Sundqvist – folk music singer, Leevi and the Leavings' singer
- Jenny Wilhelms – folk music singer

=== Metal ===
- Marko Hietala – bassist and backing vocalist of Nightwish, main vocalist and co-founding member of Tarot
- Zachary Hietala – guitarist and co-founding member of Tarot
- Sami Hinkka – bassist and lyricist of Ensiferum
- Esa Holopainen – Main songwriter, current lead guitarist, and founding member of the Finnish metal band Amorphis
- Tuomas Holopainen – composer, songwriter, keyboardplayer and founding member of Nightwish
- Jan Jämsen – ex-vocalist and current lyricist of folk metal band Finntroll
- Tomi Joutsen – lead singer of Amorphis
- Tony Kakko – vocalist, composer and songwriter of Sonata Arctica
- Jari Kainulainen – ex-bassist of Stratovarius
- Antti Boman – guitarist and vocalist of death metal band Demilich
- Perttu Kivilaakso – cellist of cello-metal band Apocalyptica
- Timo Kotipelto – lead singer of Stratovarius
- Ville Laihiala – frontman of Sentenced and Poisonblack
- Alexi Laiho – frontman and lead guitarist of Children of Bodom
- Roope Latvala – guitarist of Children of Bodom
- Jani Liimatainen – former guitarist for Sonata Arctica
- Petri Lindroos – guitarist and main vocalist of Ensiferum and formerly Norther
- Jari Mäenpää – composer, singer and guitarist of Ensiferum and Wintersun
- Jukka Nevalainen – drummer of Nightwish
- Anne Nurmi – vocalist and keyboard player of Lacrimosa
- Janne Parviainen – drummer of Ensiferum, Sinergy and Barathrum
- Tomi Putaansuu – frontman and singer of Lordi
- Jaska Raatikainen – drummer for Children of Bodom
- Sami Raatikainen – guitarist for Necrophagist
- Henkka Seppälä – bassist for Children of Bodom
- Emmi Silvennoinen – keyboardist of Ensiferum
- Jani Stefanovic – guitarist, drummer, keyboardist, and bassist for Miseration and Solution .45, formerly of Crimson Moonlight and Renascent
- Markus Toivonen – founder, guitarist, songwriter and backing vocalist of Ensiferum
- Timo Tolkki – guitarist and ex-singer of Stratovarius
- Eicca Toppinen – cellist of cello-metal band Apocalyptica
- Emppu Vuorinen – guitarist of Nightwish
- Janne Wirman – keyboard player of Children of Bodom

=== Opera ===
- Emmy Achté (1876–1924) – mezzo-soprano
- Aino Ackté (1876–1944) – soprano
- Ida Basilier-Magelssen (1846–1928) – soprano
- Kim Borg (1919–2000) – bass
- Monica Groop (born 1958) – mezzo-soprano
- Alma Fohström (1856–1936) – soprano
- Elin Fohström (1868–1949) – soprano
- Jorma Hynninen (born 1941) – baritone
- Soile Isokoski (born 1957) – soprano
- Tom Krause (1934–2013) – bass-baritone
- Karita Mattila (born 1960) – soprano
- Matti Salminen (born 1945) – bass
- Martti Talvela (1935–1989) – bass
- Tarja Turunen (born 1977) – soprano

=== Other ===
==== A–M ====
- Jonne Aaron – frontman of Negative
- Ismo Alanko – rock musician
- Jukka Ammondt – literature professor and musician who has recorded songs of Elvis Presley in Latin and Sumerian.
- Nikke Ankara – rap musician
- Mikko Aspa – lead singer of Deathspell Omega and owner of Northern Heritage label
- Kirill Babitzin (1950–2007)
- Maximilian Theodor Buch – historic academic and nationalist
- Carola – jazz and pop singer
- Elastinen – rap musician, half of the rap duo Fintelligens
- Cheek – rap musician, broke many Spotify records in Finland
- Irwin Goodman a.k.a. Antti Hammarberg (1943–1991) – protest singer
- Sara Forsberg a.k.a. SAARA – Swedish-Finnish American
- Samu Haber – singer and guitarist from Sunrise Avenue, solo singer-songwriter and tv music competition judge
- Aki Hakala – drummer of The Rasmus
- Hector
- Lasse Heikkilä – composer, songwriter, producer, vocalist and multi-instrumentalist
- Eero Heinonen – bassist of The Rasmus
- Reino Helismaa (1913–1965)
- Janita – soul, pop, and alternative singer-songwriter
- Tomi Joutsen – lead singer of Amorphis
- Markus Kaarlonen – "Captain" keyboardist and producer of rock band Poets of the Fall
- Maria Kalaniemi
- Mika Karppinen – drummer from the band HIM
- Viktor Klimenko
- Samuli Kosminen
- Sakari Kukko
- Mikko Kuustonen – singer-songwriter
- Hildá Länsman (born 1993) – Sámi pop singer
- Juice Leskinen – rock musician
- Mikko Lindström – guitarist from the band HIM
- Jyrki Linnankivi – lead singer of the 69 Eyes
- Jaska Makinen – rhythm guitarist of rock band Poets of the Fall
- Tommy Mansikka-Aho
- Jarkko Martikainen
- Andy McCoy – former guitarist of Hanoi Rocks, rock musician
- Michael Monroe – former singer of Hanoi Rocks, rock musician
- Käärijä a.k.a. Jere Mikael Pöyhönen – rap musician and Finland's representative in Eurovision Song Contest 2023

==== N–Z ====
- Sara Nunes – singer
- Sandhja
- Tuomari Nurmio
- Harri Nuutinen
- Olga Oinola (1865–1949) – President of the Finnish Women Association
- Mikko Paananen – bass player for the rock band HIM
- Hanna Pakarinen – pop singer
- Paleface – rap musician
- Maukka Perusjätkä – punk rocker
- Mika Pohjola – jazz pianist and composer
- Pekka Pohjola
- Kimmo Pohjonen
- Lauri Porra
- Janne Puurtinen – keyboard player from the band HIM
- Iiro Rantala
- Riku Rajamaa – lead guitarist and background singer from Sunrise Avenue, also active as a singer-songwriter
- Pauli Rantasalmi – guitarist of The Rasmus
- Tapio Rautavaara
- Toivo Rybak
- Marko Saaresto – lyricist, lead singer of rock band Poets of the Fall
- Jari Salminen – drummer of rock band Poets of the Fall
- Jari Sillanpää – Finnish "tango king", singer
- Sir Christus – former guitarist for the band Negative
- Aki Sirkesalo (1962–2004) – singer
- Jani "Hellboy" Snellman – bass guitarist of rock band Poets of the Fall
- Kyllikki Solanterä (1908–1965) – popular singer, vocal teacher and lyricist
- Topi Sorsakoski – schlager and rock'n'roll singer
- Gösta Sundqvist
- Jonna Tervomaa – pop singer
- Jukka Tolonen
- Antti Tuisku – pop musician,
- Olli Tukiainen – lead guitarist of rock band Poets of the Fall
- Tellu Turkka
- Tarja Turunen – former lead singer of the symphonic metal band Nightwish
- Petri Walli (1969–1995)
- Juha Watt Vainio
- Ville Valo – lead singer of HIM
- Edward Vesala (1945–1999) – jazz musician, composer, drummer
- Jussi Heikki Tapio Vuori – drummer of the 69 Eyes
- Olavi Virta – singer
- Laura Voutilainen – pop singer
- Maija Vilkkumaa – pop/rock singer
- Lauri Ylönen – lead singer of The Rasmus
- A. W. Yrjänä – rock singer, bass guitarist, songwriter, poet

== Musical groups ==
- The 69 Eyes
- Amorphis
- Apocalyptica
- Apulanta
- Blind Channel
- Bomfunk MC’s
- Children Of Bodom
- Darude
- HIM
- Lordi
- Nightwish
- Nylon Beat
- PMMP
- Poets of the Fall
- The Rasmus
- Sonata Arctica
- Stam1na
- Stratovarius

== Philosophers ==
- Timo Airaksinen
- Lili Alanen
- Anders Chydenius
- Arto Haapala
- Jaakko Hintikka
- Pekka Himanen
- Matti Häyry
- Eino Kaila
- Raili Kauppi
- S. Albert Kivinen
- Pentti Linkola
- Eeva-Liisa Manner
- Ilkka Niiniluoto
- Esa Saarinen
- J. V. Snellman
- Eero Tarasti
- Raimo Tuomela
- Thomas Wallgren
- Edward Westermarck
- Georg Henrik von Wright

== Politicians ==
- Esko Aho – prime minister 1991–1995
- Martti Ahtisaari – United Nations diplomat and mediator; Nobel Peace Prize winner; president of Finland 1994–2000
- Karl-August Fagerholm – politician (1901–1984)
- Tarja Halonen – First female president of Finland, 2000–2012
- Satu Hassi – MEP
- Heidi Hautala – MEP
- Harri Holkeri – prime minister and UN diplomat
- Ville Itälä – MEP
- Max Jakobson – UN diplomat
- Anneli Jäätteenmäki – prime minister 2003
- Kyösti Kallio – president of Finland 1937–1940 (1873–1940)
- Urho Kekkonen – president of Finland 1956–1982 (1900–1986)
- Mari Kiviniemi – prime minister 2010–2011
- Mauno Koivisto – president of Finland 1982–1994
- Aleksander von Kothen – senator
- Hertta Kuusinen – communist politician (1904–1974)
- Otto Ville Kuusinen – head of the communist Terijoki Government, later Soviet politician (1881–1964)
- Axel Lille – founder of the Swedish People's Party (1848–1921)
- Paavo Lipponen – prime minister 1995–2003, the first speaker of the Finnish Parliament 2003–2007
- Maria Lohela – speaker of the Finnish Parliament 2015–2018
- Carl Gustaf Emil Mannerheim – commander-in-chief, regent, president 1944–1946 (1867–1951)
- Sanna Marin – prime minister 2019–2023
- Martti Miettunen – prime minister 1961–1962 and 1975–1977
- Sauli Niinistö – president of Finland 2012–2024
- Juho Kusti Paasikivi – president of Finland 1946–1956 (1870–1956)
- Lauri Kristian Relander – president of Finland 1925–1931 (1883–1942)
- Elisabeth Rehn – politician
- Olli Rehn – commissioner and vice-president of the European Commission
- Heikki Ritavuori – assassinated minister (1880–1922)
- Risto Ryti – president of Finland 1940–1944 (1889–1956)
- Miina Sillanpää – minister
- Taisto Sinisalo – communist politician
- Helvi Sipilä – UN diplomat
- Juha Sipilä – prime minister 2015–2019
- Johan Vilhelm Snellman – writer and senator (1806–1881)
- Osmo Soininvaara – minister
- Kalevi Sorsa – prime minister (1930–2004)
- Kaarlo Juho Ståhlberg – president of Finland 1919–1925 (1865–1952)
- Alexander Stubb – prime minister 2014–2015, president of Finland 2024–present
- Ulf Sundqvist
- Pehr Evind Svinhufvud – regent and president of Finland 1931–1937 (1861–1944)
- Väinö Tanner – prime minister 1926–1927 (1881–1966)
- Oskari Tokoi – prime minister 1917 (1873–1963)
- Erkki Tuomioja – foreign minister (2000–2007)
- Martti Turunen – Japanese Diet member of Finnish origin 2002–2013
- Matti Vanhanen – prime minister 2003–2010
- Johannes Virolainen – prime minister in 1964–1966 (1914–2000)
- Hella Wuolijoki – parliamentarian, writer (1886–1954)

== Scientists ==
- Lars Valerian Ahlfors – mathematician, Fields Medalist 1936 (1907–1996)
- Väinö Auer – explorer, geologist, geographer (1895–1981)
- Matthias Castren – ethnologist (1813–1852)
- Anders Chydenius – classical liberal (1729–1803)
- Kari Enqvist – cosmologist
- Teppo Felin – professor at the University of Oxford
- Johan Gadolin – chemist (1760–1852)
- Ragnar Granit – medicine, Nobelist (1900–1991)
- Hilma Granqvist – anthropologist (1890–1972)
- Ilkka Hanski – Crafoord Prize winning ecologist (1953–2016)
- Bengt Holmström – economist, Nobelist (1949–)
- Kimmo Innanen – astronomer (1937–2011)
- Pehr Kalm – botanist (1716–1779)
- Teuvo Kohonen – neurocomputing pioneer (1934–2021)
- Anders Johan Lexell – mathematician, astronomer (1740–1784)
- Ernst Lindelöf – mathematician, researcher of function theory and topology (1870–1946)
- Olli Lounasmaa – physicist, researcher of low-temperature physics (1930–2002)
- Hjalmar Mellin – mathematician (1854–1933)
- Risto Näätänen – psychologist and neuroscientist (1939–2023)
- Rolf Nevanlinna – mathematician (1895–1980)
- Nils Gustaf Nordenskiöld – mineralogist (1792–1866)
- Adolf Erik Nordenskiöld – polar explorer, political refugee in Sweden (1832–1901)
- Gunnar Nordström – theoretical physicist (1881–1923)
- Aili Nurminen – meteorologist (1896–1972)
- Liisi Oterma – astronomer (1915–2001)
- Leena Palotie – gene scientist (1952–2010)
- Simo Parpola – orientalist, assyriologist
- Tuija I. Pulkkinen – space scientist (born 1962)
- Helena Ranta – pathologist, forensic dentist
- Eric Tigerstedt – inventor, Thomas Edison of Finland (1887–1925)
- Kari S. Tikka – justice and finance professor (1944–2006)
- Esko Valtaoja – astronomer
- Tatu Vanhanen – political scientist (1929–2015)
- Artturi Ilmari Virtanen – chemist, Nobelist (1895–1973)
- Vilho Väisälä – mathematician, inventor of meteorological instruments (1889–1969)
- Yrjö Väisälä – astronomer, meteorologist (1891–1971)
- Edvard Westermarck – philosopher, sociologist (1862–1939)
- Joy Wolfram – nanoscientist (1989–)
- Arvo Ylppö – pediatrician (1887–1992)

== Soldiers ==
- Aksel Airo – general (1898–1985)
- Adolf Ehrnrooth – general (1905–2004)
- Axel Heinrichs – general (1890–1965)
- Simo Häyhä (a.k.a. White Death) – first lieutenant, sharpshooter 505 confirmed sniper kills (1905–2002)
- Hannes Ignatius – lieutenant general (1871–1941)
- Aarne Juutilainen (a.k.a. Terror of Morocco) – captain (1904–1976)
- Eino Ilmari Juutilainen – pilot, twice knight of Mannerheim cross (1914–1999)
- Jorma Karhunen – pilot, aviation writer (1913–2002)
- Jussi Kekkonen – major, younger brother of president Urho Kekkonen (1910–1962)
- Aimo Koivunen – corporal (1939–1944)
- Ruben Lagus – major general (1896–1956)
- Carl Gustaf Emil Mannerheim – marshal of Finland (1867–1951)
- Vilho Petter Nenonen – general (1883–1960)
- Karl Lennart Oesch – lieutenant general (1892–1978)
- Mika Peltonen – brigadier general (born 1956)
- Jorma Sarvanto – fighter pilot, World War II ace (1912–1963)
- Waldemar Schauman – lieutenant general, politician (1844–1911)
- Ensio Siilasvuo – general (1922–2001)
- Hjalmar Siilasvuo – general (1892–1947)
- Georg Magnus Sprengtporten – general (1740–1819)
- Torsten Stålhandske – commander of Hakkapelites (1594–1644)
- Paavo Susitaival – lieutenant colonel (1896–1993)
- Lauri Sutela – general (1918–2011)
- Paavo Talvela – general (1897–1973)
- Lauri Törni (a.k.a. Larry Thorne) – captain (1919–1965)
- Rudolf Walden – general (1878–1946)
- Kurt Martti Wallenius – major general (1893–1984)
- Hans Wind – pilot, twice knight of Mannerheim cross (1919–1995)
- Harald Öhquist – lieutenant general (1891–1971)
- Hugo Österman – lieutenant general (1892–1975)
- Karl Fredrik Wilkama – general of the infantry (1876–1947)

== Sportspeople ==
=== Athletics ===
- Ashprihanal Pekka Aalto – ultramarathoner and extreme endurance athlete
- Arto Bryggare – hurdling athlete
- Sari Essayah – race walker, world champion
- Tommi Evilä – long jumper
- Arsi Harju – shot putter, Olympic champion
- Eduard Hämäläinen – decathlete
- Arto Härkönen – javelin thrower, Olympic champion
- Gunnar Höckert – runner, Olympic champion (1910–1940)
- Volmari Iso-Hollo – runner, two Olympic gold medals (1907–1969)
- Akilles Järvinen – decathlete (1905–1943)
- Matti Järvinen – javelin thrower, Olympic champion (1909–1985)
- Verner Järvinen – discus thrower, Olympic champion (1870–1941)
- Kaarlo Kangasniemi – weightlifter, Olympic champion 1968 Mexico
- Olli-Pekka Karjalainen – hammer thrower
- Veikko Karvonen – marathon runner (Boston Marathon winner 1954)
- Elias Katz – runner, Olympic champion (3,000m team steeplechase) and silver (3,000m steeplechase) (1901–1947)
- Jukka Keskisalo – runner
- Kimmo Kinnunen – javelin thrower, world champion
- Hannes Kolehmainen – runner, four Olympic gold medals (1889–1966)
- Valentin Kononen – race walker, world champion
- Tapio Korjus – javelin thrower, Olympic champion
- Teodor Koskenniemi – runner, Olympic champion (1887–1965)
- Paavo Kotila – marathon runner (Boston Marathon winner 1960)
- Harri Larva – runner, Olympic champion (1906–1980)
- Lauri Lehtinen – runner, Olympic champion (1908–1973)
- Eero Lehtonen – pentathlete, two Olympic gold medals (1898–1959)
- Heikki Liimatainen – runner, two Olympic gold medals (1894–1980)
- Tiina Lillak – javelin thrower, world champion
- Toivo Loukola – runner, Olympic champion (1902–1984)
- Taisto Mäki – long-distance runner, multiple world record holder (1910–1979)
- Jonni Myyrä – javelin thrower, two Olympic gold medals (1892–1955)
- Pauli Nevala – javelin thrower, Olympic champion
- Elmer Niklander – discus thrower and shot putter, Olympic champion (1890–1942)
- Paavo Nurmi – runner, nine Olympic gold medals (1897–1973)
- Eino Oksanen – marathon runner (Boston Marathon winner 1959, 1961,1962)
- Aki Parviainen – javelin thrower, world champion
- Tero Pitkämäki – javelin thrower, world champion
- Ville Pörhölä – shot putter, Olympic champion (1897–1964)
- Heli Rantanen – javelin thrower, Olympic champion
- Tapio Rautavaara – javelin thrower, Olympic champion (1915–1979)
- Ville Ritola – runner, five Olympic gold medals (1896–1982)
- Seppo Räty – javelin thrower, three Olympic medals, world champion
- Julius Saaristo – javelin thrower, Olympic champion (1891–1969)
- Ilmari Salminen – runner, Olympic champion (1902–1986)
- Albin Stenroos – marathon runner, Olympic champion (1889–1971)
- Olavi Suomalainen – marathon runner (Boston Marathon winner 1972)
- Armas Taipale – discus thrower, Olympic champion (1890–1976)
- Juha Tiainen – hammer thrower, Olympic champion
- Abraham Tokazier – sprinter
- Vilho Tuulos – triple jumper, Olympic champion (1895–1967)
- Pekka Vasala – runner, Olympic champion
- Lasse Virén – runner, four Olympic gold medals
- Paavo Yrjölä – decathlete, Olympic champion

=== Basketball ===
- Petteri Koponen – basketball player, first Finnish first round pick in NBA draft
- Lauri Markkanen – basketball player, currently with the NBA's Utah Jazz
- Hanno Möttölä – basketball player, first Finnish NBA player, now a coach
- Miron Ruina (born 1998) – Finnish-Israeli basketball player in the Israeli Basketball Premier League

=== Football ===
- Abiola Bamijoko
- Alexei Eremenko Jr.
- Roman Eremenko
- Mikael Forssell
- Kasper Hämäläinen
- Markus Heikkinen
- Lukáš Hrádecký
- Sami Hyypiä
- Jonatan Johansson
- Jussi Jääskeläinen
- Joonas Kolkka
- Shefki Kuqi
- Jari Litmanen
- Niklas Moisander
- Antti Niemi
- Mixu Paatelainen
- Petri Pasanen
- Juhani Peltonen
- Roni Porokara
- Aki Riihilahti
- Aulis Rytkönen
- Rasmus Schüller
- Mikko Siivikko
- Teemu Tainio
- Niilo Tammisalo
- Hannu Tihinen
- Mika Väyrynen
- Mika Ääritalo
- Teemu Pukki
- Anssi Jaakkola
- Markku Kanerva
- Joel Pohjanpalo
- Glen Kamara

=== Ice hockey ===
==== A–K ====
- Antti Aalto
- Sebastian Aho
- Sami Aittokallio
- Aleksander Barkov
- Aki Berg
- Sean Bergenheim
- Timo Blomqvist
- Niklas Bäckström
- Toni Eskelinen
- Mikko Eloranta
- Valtteri Filppula
- Mikael Granlund
- Tuomas Grönman
- Anne Haanpää
- Matti Hagman
- Niklas Hagman
- Maija Hassinen-Sullanmaa
- Riku Hahl
- Sanni Hakala
- Teemu Hartikainen
- Ilkka Heikkinen
- Miro Heiskanen
- Riku Helenius
- Anne Helin
- Raimo Helminen
- Jukka Hentunen
- Jenni Hiirikoski
- Roope Hintz
- Kim Hirschovits
- Elisa Holopainen
- Venla Hovi
- Jani Hurme
- Erik Hämäläinen
- Kirsi Hänninen
- Marianne Ihalainen
- Jarkko Immonen
- Mira Jalosuo
- Jesse Joensuu
- Jussi Jokinen
- Olli Jokinen
- Timo Jutila
- Hannu Järvenpää
- Iiro Järvi
- Valtteri Järviluoma
- Kaapo Kakko
- Tomi Kallio
- Niko Kapanen
- Sami Kapanen
- Kasperi Kapanen
- Jere Karalahti
- Michelle Karvinen
- Anni Keisala
- Esa Keskinen
- Markus Ketterer
- Satu Kiipeli
- Anna Kilponen
- Marko Kiprusoff
- Miikka Kiprusoff
- Mikko Koivu
- Saku Koivu – current IOC member
- Leo Komarov
- Petri Kontiola
- Lauri Korpikoski
- Sari Krooks
- Mira Kuisma
- Lasse Kukkonen
- Jari Kurri

==== L–Q ====
- Teemu Laakso
- Antti Laaksonen
- Erkki Laine
- Mikko Laine
- Patrik Laine
- Nelli Laitinen
- Janne Laukkanen
- Esa Lehikoinen
- Tero Lehterä
- Jere Lehtinen
- Erkki Lehtonen
- Kari Lehtonen
- Mikko Lehtonen (born 1978)
- Mikko Lehtonen (born 1987)
- Ville Leino
- Juha Lind
- Esa Lindell
- Perttu Lindgren
- Rosa Lindstedt
- Jyrki Lumme
- Mikko Luoma
- Toni Lydman
- Pentti Lund
- Lauri Marjamäki
- Sari Marjamäki (née Fisk)
- Jussi Markkanen
- Terhi Mertanen
- Antti Miettinen
- Reijo Mikkolainen
- Jarmo Myllys
- Olli Määttä
- Mikko Mäkelä
- Niina Mäkinen
- Antti Niemi
- Antti-Jussi Niemi
- Saara Niemi (née Tuominen)
- Mika Nieminen
- Petra Nieminen
- Ville Nieminen
- Janne Niinimaa
- Antero Niittymäki
- Janne Niskala
- Tanja Niskanen
- Petteri Nokelainen
- Mika Noronen
- Fredrik Norrena
- Petteri Nummelin
- Teppo Numminen
- Pasi Nurminen
- Emma Nuutinen
- Janne Öfverström
- Janne Ojanen
- Suvi Ollikainen
- Joni Ortio
- Kai Ortio
- Oskar Osala
- Marko Palo
- Oona Parviainen
- Mari Pehkonen
- Ville Peltonen
- Heidi Pelttari
- Harri Pesonen
- Janne Pesonen
- Tuomas Pihlman
- Antti Pihlström
- Joni Pitkänen
- Mariia Posa
- Jesse Puljujärvi
- Tuula Puputti
- Mika Pyörälä
- Marja-Helena Pälvilä
- Timo Pärssinen

==== R–Z ====
- Isa Rahunen
- Annina Rajahuhta
- Tiina Ranne
- Karoliina Rantamäki
- Mikko Rantanen
- Joonas Rask
- Tuukka Rask
- Katja Riipi
- Pekka Rinne
- Kimmo Rintanen
- Jani Rita
- Arto Ruotanen
- Reijo Ruotsalainen
- Christian Ruuttu
- Jarkko Ruutu
- Tuomo Ruutu
- Jussi Rynnäs
- Noora Räty
- Meeri Räisänen
- Juuso Rämö
- Karri Rämö
- Noora Räty
- Saila Saari
- Mari Saarinen
- Simo Saarinen
- Maria Saarni
- Riikka Sallinen (née Nieminen, previously Välilä)
- Anssi Salmela
- Tony Salmelainen
- Sami Salo
- Tommi Santala
- Eve Savander
- Ronja Savolainen
- Teemu Selänne
- Essi Sievers
- Hanne Sikiö
- Jenna Silvonen
- Ilkka Sinisalo
- Ville Sirén
- Petri Skriko
- Liisa-Maria Sneck
- Mika Strömberg
- Kai Suikkanen
- Ari Sulander
- Raimo Summanen
- Eveliina Suonpää
- Timo Susi
- Keijo Säilynoja
- Sara Säkkinen
- Nora Tallus
- Jukka Tammi
- Vilma Tanskanen
- Susanna Tapani
- Saija Tarkki
- Emma Terho (née Laaksonen) – current IOC member
- Teuvo Teräväinen
- Esa Tikkanen
- Nina Tikkinen
- Kimmo Timonen
- Jari Torkki
- Vesa Toskala
- Noora Tulus
- Minttu Tuominen
- Satu Tuominen
- Pekka Tuomisto
- Antti Törmänen
- Petra Vaarakallio
- Vilma Vaattovaara
- Viivi Vainikka
- Anna Vanhatalo
- Petri Varis
- Sami Vatanen
- Ella Viitasuo
- Hannu Virta
- Päivi Virta (previously Halonen)
- Jukka Virtanen
- Marjo Voutilainen
- Linda Välimäki
- Ossi Väänänen
- Petteri Wirtanen
- Juha Ylönen

=== Motorsports ===
- Mika Ahola – enduro rider (1974–2012)
- Pentti Airikkala – rally driver
- Markku Alén – rally driver
- Samuli Aro – enduro rider
- Valtteri Bottas – Formula One driver
- Toni Gardemeister – rally driver
- Marcus Grönholm – rally driver. 2 time World Champion
- Mikko Hirvonen – rally driver
- Mika Häkkinen – Formula One driver 2 time World Champion
- Mika Kallio – motorcycle racer
- Juha Kankkunen – rally driver. 4 time World Champion
- Leo Kinnunen – Formula One driver
- Heikki Kovalainen – Formula One driver
- Teuvo Länsivuori – motorcycle racer
- Jari-Matti Latvala – rally driver
- JJ Lehto – Formula One driver
- Hannu Mikkola – rally driver
- Heikki Mikkola – motocross racer
- Timo Mäkinen – rally driver
- Tommi Mäkinen – rally driver. 4 time World Champion
- Kauko Nieminen – speedway racer
- Taru Rinne – motorcycle racer
- Keke Rosberg – Formula One driver, World Champion 1982
- Harri Rovanperä – rally driver
- Kalle Rovanperä - rally driver
- Kimi Räikkönen – Formula One driver, World Champion in 2007; rally driver; NASCAR driver
- Jarno Saarinen – motorcycle racer (1945–1973)
- Juha Salminen – enduro rider
- Mika Salo – Formula One driver
- Timo Salonen – rally driver
- Kari Tiainen – enduro rider
- Henri Toivonen – rally driver (1956–1986)
- Ari Vatanen – rally driver

=== Rowing ===
- Yrjö Hietanen – rower, two Olympic gold medals
- Pertti Karppinen – rower, three Olympic gold medals
- Kurt Wires – rower, two Olympic gold medals (1919–1991)

=== Winter sports ===
- Janne Ahonen – ski jumper
- Antti Autti – snowboarder
- Eero Ettala – snowboarder, 2006 World Champion
- Veikko Hakulinen – cross-country skier, three Olympic gold medals
- Janne Happonen – ski jumper
- Heikki Hasu – Nordic combined, two Olympic gold medals
- Matti Hautamäki – ski jumper
- Antti Hyvärinen – ski jumper
- Kalevi Hämäläinen – cross-country skier
- Risto Jussilainen – ski jumper
- Marjatta Kajosmaa – cross-country skier
- Veikko Kankkonen – ski jumper
- Jouko Karjalainen – Nordic combined
- Klaes Karppinen – cross-country skier
- Kalle Keituri – ski jumper
- Harri Kirvesniemi – cross-country skier
- Marja-Liisa Kirvesniemi – cross-country skier, three Olympic gold medals
- Anssi Koivuranta – Nordic combined
- Kiira Korpi – figure skater
- Markku Koski – snowboarder and Olympic bronze medalist (Men's Snowboarding Halfpipe)
- Kai Kovaljeff – ski jumper
- Hilkka Kuntola – cross-country skier
- Risto Laakkonen – ski jumper
- Janne Lahtela – freestyle skier
- Mika Laitinen – ski jumper
- Samppa Lajunen – Olympic gold medalist (Nordic combined) and (sprint)
- Ville Larinto – ski jumper
- Janne Leskinen – alpine skier
- Hannu Manninen – Nordic combined
- Marjo Matikainen-Kallström – cross-country skier
- Juha Mieto – cross-country skier
- Olli Muotka – ski jumper
- Kaija Mustonen – speed skater
- Mika Myllylä – cross-country skier
- Eero Mäntyranta – cross-country skier, three Olympic gold medals
- Toni Nieminen – ski jumper, two Olympic gold medals
- Ari-Pekka Nikkola – ski jumper, two Olympic gold medals
- Matti Nykänen – ski jumper, four Olympic gold medals, one Olympic silver medal
- Harri Olli– ski jumper
- Kalle Palander – skier
- Peetu Piiroinen – snowboarder, one Olympic silver medal (halfpipe)
- Tanja Poutiainen – skier
- Jari Puikkonen – ski jumper
- Siiri Rantanen – cross-country skier
- Marjut Rolig (née Lukkarinen) – cross-country skier, one olympic gold- and silver medal
- Mikko Ronkainen – freestyle skier
- Janne Ryynänen – Nordic combined
- Veli Saarinen – cross-country skier
- Julius Skutnabb – speed skater
- Jani Soininen – ski jumper
- Helena Takalo – cross-country skier
- Jaakko Tallus – Nordic combined
- Clas Thunberg – speed skater, five Olympic gold medals
- Jouko Törmänen – ski jumper
- Tuomo Ylipulli – ski jumper
- Kaisa Mäkäräinen – biathlete, one-time World Champion, 6 total medals at World Championships

=== Other ===
- Paavo Aaltonen – gymnast, three Olympic gold medals (1919–1962)
- Jouko Ahola – World's strongest man champion twice
- Patrik Antonius – High-stakes poker player
- Kalle Anttila – wrestler, two Olympic gold medals (1887–1975)
- Kike Elomaa – IFBB professional bodybuilder
- Veikka Gustafsson – mountain climber
- Veikko Huhtanen – gymnast, three Olympic gold medals (1919–1976)
- Nalle Hukkataival - professional rock climber, first person to ascend a 9A grade boulder
- Robin Hull – snooker player
- Mikko Ilonen – golfer
- Mika Immonen – pool player
- Antti Kasvio – swimmer
- Minna Kauppi – orienteer, nine-time World Champion
- Marko Kemppainen – skeet shooter
- Mika Koivuniemi – ten-pin bowler
- Väinö Kokkinen – wrestler, two Olympic gold medals (1899–1967)
- Pentti Linnosvuo – sport shooter, two Olympic gold medals
- Matti Mattsson – swimmer, one World Championship bronze medal
- Jarkko Nieminen – tennis player
- Lauri "Tahko" Pihkala – inventor of Finnish baseball (1888–1981)
- Kustaa Pihlajamäki – wrestler, two Olympic gold medals (1902–1944)
- Jarno Pihlava – swimmer
- Arto Saari – pro skateboarder
- Ale Saarvala – gymnast, two Olympic gold medals
- Kasperi Salo – badminton player
- Heikki Savolainen – gymnast, two Olympic gold medals (1907–1998)
- Hanna-Maria Seppälä – swimmer, World champion
- Jani Sievinen – swimmer, one Olympic silver and many other international medals, mostly gold medals. Most decorated Finnish swimmer
- Markku Uusipaavalniemi – curler
- Anu Viheriäranta – ballet dancer
- Antti Viitikko – badminton player
- Janne Virtanen – world's strongest man champion
- Emil Väre – wrestler, two Olympic gold medals (1885–1974)
- Verner Weckman – wrestler, two Olympic gold medals (1882–1968)

== Theologians, clergymen ==
- Mikael Agricola
- Bishop Henry
- Lauri Ingman
- Markku Koivisto
- Lars Levi Læstadius
- Leo
- Kari Mäkinen
- Jukka Paarma
- Antti Rantamaa
- Paavo Ruotsalainen
- Frans Ludvig Schauman
- John Vikström

== Writers ==
- Juhani Aho – first professional writer
- Helena Anhava – prolific poet, writer, translator (1925–2018)
- Jean M. Auel – American writer of Finnish descent, born as Jean Marie Untinen
- Minna Canth – author (1844–1897)
- Bo Carpelan
- Marco Casagrande
- Jörn Donner – author and politician
- Anna Edelheim – journalist
- Elsa Enäjärvi-Haavio (1901–1951) – folklorist and cultural critic
- Seikko Eskola – historian
- Pentti Haanpää
- Aarne Haapakoski – pulp writer with pseudonym Outsider
- Paavo Haavikko
- Saima Harmaja – poet (1913–1937)
- Laila Hietamies
- Veikko Huovinen
- Antti Hyry
- Anna-Leena Härkönen
- Risto Isomäki – science fiction writer
- Tove Jansson – children's author of Moomin fame (1914–2001)
- Maria Jotuni (1880–1943)
- Markus Kajo – comedy writer (born 1957)
- Taito Kantonen
- Volter Kilpi
- Marko Kitti
- Aleksis Kivi – first significant author in Finnish (1834–1872)
- Leena Krohn
- Torsti Lehtinen – writer and philosopher
- Joel Lehtonen
- Eino Leino (1878–1926)
- Rosa Liksom
- Väinö Linna – author of The Unknown Soldier (1920–1992)
- Johannes Linnankoski
- Elias Lönnrot – compiled the Kalevala (1802–1884)
- Veijo Meri
- Barbara Catharina Mjödh
- Knud Möller
- Jukka Nevakivi
- Pertti Nieminen
- Carita Nyström (1940–2019) – Swedish-speaking writer
- Sofi Oksanen
- Arto Paasilinna
- Erno Paasilinna
- Olavi Paavolainen
- Onni Palaste – war novelist (1917–2009)
- Antti Puhakka – national romantic poet and politician (1816–1893)
- Kalle Päätalo (1919–2000)
- Susanne Ringell
- Johan Ludvig Runeberg – national poet (1804–1877)
- Pentti Saarikoski
- Frans Emil Sillanpää – Nobelist (1888–1964)
- Johanna Sinisalo
- Tommy Tabermann – also known from TV series Have I Got News For You a.k.a. Uutisvuoto
- Marton Taiga – pseudonym of Martti Löfberg
- Jari Tervo – also known from TV series Have I Got News For You a.k.a. Uutisvuoto
- Märta Tikkanen
- Zacharias Topelius – author and historian (1818–1898)
- Jouko Turkka
- Antti Tuuri
- Kaari Utrio
- Lauri Viita – poet and novelist known for extreme rhyme skill
- Mika Waltari (1908–1979)
- Kjell Westö
- Fredrika Wetterhoff (1844–1905)
- Hella Wuolijoki

== Other notables ==
- Simo Aalto – stage magician
- Kaarlo Bergbom – theatre director, founder of the Finnish National Theatre
- Ior Bock – eccentric
- Donner family
- Karl Fazer – confectionery manufacturer
- Nexar Antonio Flores – Ecuadorian-Finnish fashion stylist and makeup artist
- Janina Frostell – model, sex symbol and singer
- Tony Halme – show wrestler (stage name Ludwig Borga), politician
- Pirkko Hämäläinen, Ambassador to Austria
- Seppo Hentilä – historian
- Jukka Hilden – member of The Dudesons
- Toni Jerrman – science fiction critic
- Pepe Jürgens – sports commentator
- Vesa Kanniainen – economist and academic
- Liisa Kauppinen (born 1939) – human rights activist
- Helena Kekkonen (1926–2014) – peace activist
- Kuikka-Koponen – trickster and conjurer
- Armi Kuusela – Miss Universe 1952
- Jarno Laasala – member of The Dudesons
- Aarne Lakomaa – aircraft designer (1914–2001)
- Jarno "Jarppi"/"Jarno2" Leppälä – member of The Dudesons
- Arvi Lind – newscaster
- Fanni Luukkonen – leader of Lotta Svärd (1882–1947)
- Venla Luukkonen – Brazilian jiu-jitsu world champion
- Sophie Mannerheim – nurse (1863–1928)
- Tuomas "Tunna" Milonoff – starring in the Finnish television program Madventures
- Väinö Myllyrinne – the tallest Finn, 248 cm (1909–1963)
- Larin Paraske – poem singer
- Hannu-Pekka "HP" Parviainen – member of The Dudesons
- Arndt Pekurinen – pacifist (1905–1941)
- Anne Marie Pohtamo – Miss Universe 1975
- Riku Rantala – starring in the Finnish television program Madventures
- Krisse Salminen – comedian and talk show hostess
- Santa Claus
- Eugen Schauman – assassin who killed Nikolai Ivanovich Bobrikov (1875–1904)
- Ossian Schauman – founder of Folkhälsan
- August Schauman – publicist, politician, and founder of Hufvudstadsbladet
- Schauman family
- Tabe Slioor – socialite, reporter, photographer; founded the first gossip magazine in Finland
- Nils Torvalds – journalist
- Ole Torvalds – journalist (1916–1995)
- Teppo Turkki – futurologist
- Nils-Aslak Valkeapää – Sami activist (1943–2001)
- Folke West – traveller
- Heikki Jauhopää (died 1586) – executed for witchcraft

== See also ==
- List of Swedish-speaking Finns
- List of people by nationality
- Finland
