= Kerttu =

Female given name

Kerttu is a Finnish woman's name. It is the Finnish form of Gertrude. Notable people with this name include:

- Kerttu Karresmaa (born 2004), Finnish footballer
- Kerttu Kauniskangas (1920–1998), Finnish author
- Kerttu Kuja-Halkola (born 2007), Finnish ice hockey player
- Kerttu Niskanen (born 1988), Finnish cross-country skier
- Kerttu Nuorteva (1912–1963), Soviet WW2 spy
- Kerttu Nurminen (born 1943), Finnish designer and glass artist
- Kerttu Pehkonen (1928–2018), Finnish cross-country skier
- Kerttu Rytkönen (1895–1991), Finnish architect
- Kerttu Saalasti (1907–1995), Finnish politician
- Kerttu Tamminen (1898–1981) Finnish architect
- Kerttu Vuolab (born 1951), Finnish Sámi author and illustrator
- Kerttu-Kaarina Suosalmi (1921–2001), Finnish author
