= Kanniainen =

Kanniainen is a Finnish surname. Notable people with the surname include:

- Kyösti Kanniainen (1871–1915), Finnish journalist and politician
- Juho Kanniainen (1875–1929), Finnish farmer, lay preacher and politician
- Vesa Kanniainen (born 1948), Finnish economist
