= Nurminen =

Nurminen is a Finnish surname. Notable people with the surname include:

- Aili Nurminen, (1896–1972), Finnish meteorologist
- Ilmari Nurminen, Finnish politician
- Jari Nurminen (born 1961), Finnish racing driver
- Julius Nurminen (1887–1918), Finnish journalist and politician
- Jyrki Nurminen (born 1990), Finnish beach volleyball player
- Kai Nurminen (born 1969), Finnish ice hockey player
- Kerttu Nurminen (born 1943), Finnish designer and glass artist
- Pasi Nurminen (born 1975), Finnish ice hockey player
- Simo Nurminen (born 1949), Finnish orienteer
- Uno Nurminen (1895–1972), Finnish trade unionist, civil servant and politician
