= Eva Biaudet =

Finnish politician (born 1961)

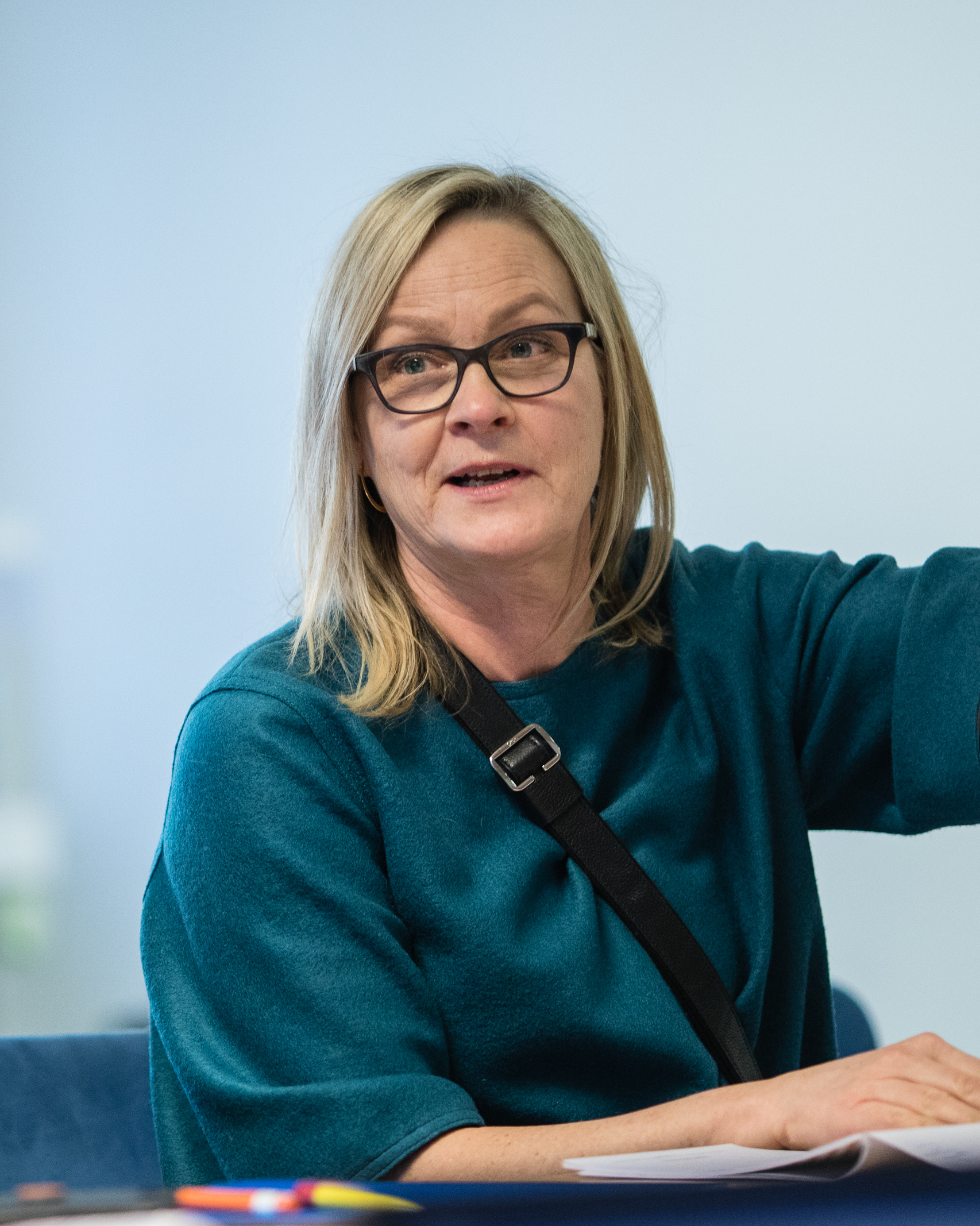

Member of the Parliament of Finland
- In office: 1991–2006; 2015–

Minister of Social Services
- In office 19 April 2002 – 17 April 2003
- Prime Minister: Paavo Lipponen
- Preceded by: Osmo Soininvaara
- Succeeded by: Liisa Hyssälä
- In office 15 April 1999 – 25 April 2000
- Prime Minister: Paavo Lipponen
- Preceded by: Position established
- Succeeded by: Osmo Soininvaara

Personal details
- Born: 27 February 1961 (age 65) Helsinki, Uusimaa, Finland
- Party: Swedish People's Party
- Education: University of Helsinki

Eva Rita Katarina Biaudet (born 27 February 1961) is a Finnish politician and Member of Parliament of Finland in the parliamentary group of the Swedish People's Party. She returned to the Finnish Parliament in the parliamentary election of April 2015. Eva Biaudet was Member of Parliament of Finland (1991–2006) and is a former Minister of Social Services (1999–2000 and 2002–2003). After the election of 2003 Biaudet did not want to continue as a cabinet minister.

Biaudet was appointed as the Ombudsman for Minorities for a term of five years starting in 2010. A complaint was made concerning her nomination because she was formally unqualified for the office, as she lacked a university degree. Biaudet had studied law, but never graduated. The complaint did not succeed, as Biaudet was granted a special permission. Her lack of a university degree caused a lot of debate and brought accusations of politics in her appointment.

2012 Eva Biaudet was the Swedish People's Party candidate in the Finnish presidential election, finishing 7th with 2.7% of votes in the first round of voting. In June 2011 the U.S. credited Biaudet for her continued work against human trafficking.

In 2015, Biaudet could not seek a continuation for her five-year term as the Ombudsman for Minorities due to her lack of a university degree, because the formal qualifications of the office had been defined by law after 2010. She was elected to the Parliament of Finland in 2015 and re-elected in 2019.

Biaudet went to the Swedish-language co-educational school Nya svenska samskolan.

== Honors ==
- Legion of Honour (France, 2008)

Political offices
New office	Minister of Health and Social Services; 1999–2000	Succeeded by Osmo Soininvaara
Preceded by Osmo Soininvaara	Minister of Health and Social Services; 2002–2003	Succeeded by Liisa Hyssälä
