= Sarkkinen =

Sarkkinen is a Finnish surname. Notable people with the surname include:

- Esco Sarkkinen (1918–1998), American football player and coach
- Hanna Sarkkinen (born 1988), Finnish politician

== See also ==
- Sakkinen
