= Sampsa =

Sampsa is a Finnish first name originating in native traditional poetry, such as the Kalevala.

== People ==
- Sampsa (street artist), a graffiti artist from Finland
- Sampsa Astala, a musician better known by his stage name Stala in Stala&SO-band, and as Kita of Lordi
- Sampsa Pellervoinen, a figure from Kalevala, a mythical person who sows all the forests of the land
