= Peltonen =

Peltonen is a Finnish occupational surname, which is derived from pelto, meaning "field" in English. Notable people with the surname include:

- Benjamin Peltonen (born 1997), Finnish singer
- Eemeli Peltonen (1994–2025), Finnish politician
- Juhani Peltonen (born 1936), Finnish footballer
- Kirsi Peltonen, Finnish mathematician
- Esa Peltonen (born 1947), Finnish professional ice hockey player
- Mika Peltonen (born 1956), Finnish Army Brigadier General
- Tuomas Peltonen (born 1977), Finnish footballer
- Tuula Peltonen (born 1962), Finnish politician
- Ville Peltonen (born 1973), Finnish professional ice hockey forward

== See also ==
- Peltonen (company), Finnish ski manufacturer
