= Pirkko Hämäläinen =

Pirkko Hämäläinen may refer to:

- Pirkko Hämäläinen (actress)
- Pirkko Hämäläinen (diplomat)
