= Universal basic income in the Nordic countries =

Universal basic income (Swedish: basinkomst or medborgarlön) has been debated in the Nordic countries since the 1970s. From 1 January 2017 to 1 January 2019 Finland conducted a basic income pilot which got international attention. There are also some political parties and some politicians and journalists in all Nordic countries who are pushing for the idea of a guaranteed income. The Green parties for example, are generally interested in universal basic income, as well as the Nordic Pirate parties.

== National debates ==
=== Sweden ===
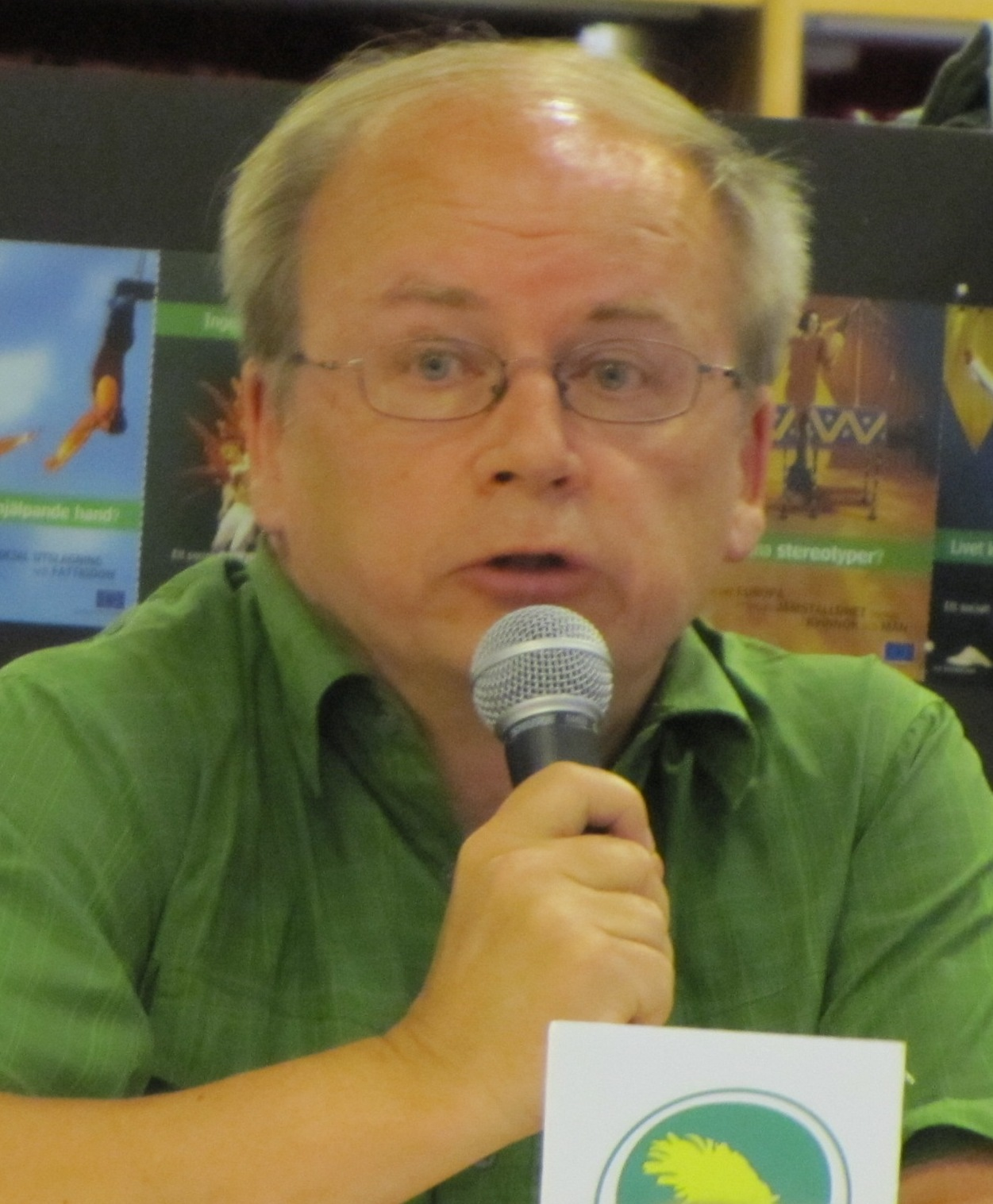
Valter Mutt, Miljöpartiet

Basic income was debated in Sweden in the 1970s and 1980s, mostly thanks to influences from abroad, such as Milton Friedman and André Gorz. The Swedish/Danish economist Gunnar Adler-Karlsson was also influential at that time. During the 1990s the ideas came back again, for example with the polemic books by Lars Ekstrand 1995 and 1996. He criticized the full employment-ideology and argued, with reference to people such as Paul Lafargue and Aristotle, but also the Danish debate, that freedom would be a much better goal. Gunnar Wetterberg, leader in the labour Union, was perhaps the most active in the other ring-side, arguing that basic income was a threat to just about everything, but mostly jobs, growth and equality. The Green Party has flirted with the basic income idea since the start of the party, but has nevertheless not pushed for it seriously politically. However, the party congress 2015 decided that the party should work for a state investigation. None of the other political parties in the parliament is for basic income, or even basic income pilots, at the moment. But the Feminist Party (Feministiskt initiativ) and the Swedish Pirate Party (Piratpartiet) are both sympathetic to the idea. Especially the Pirates, who see automation and technological development overall, as a key argument for basic income.

=== Finland ===
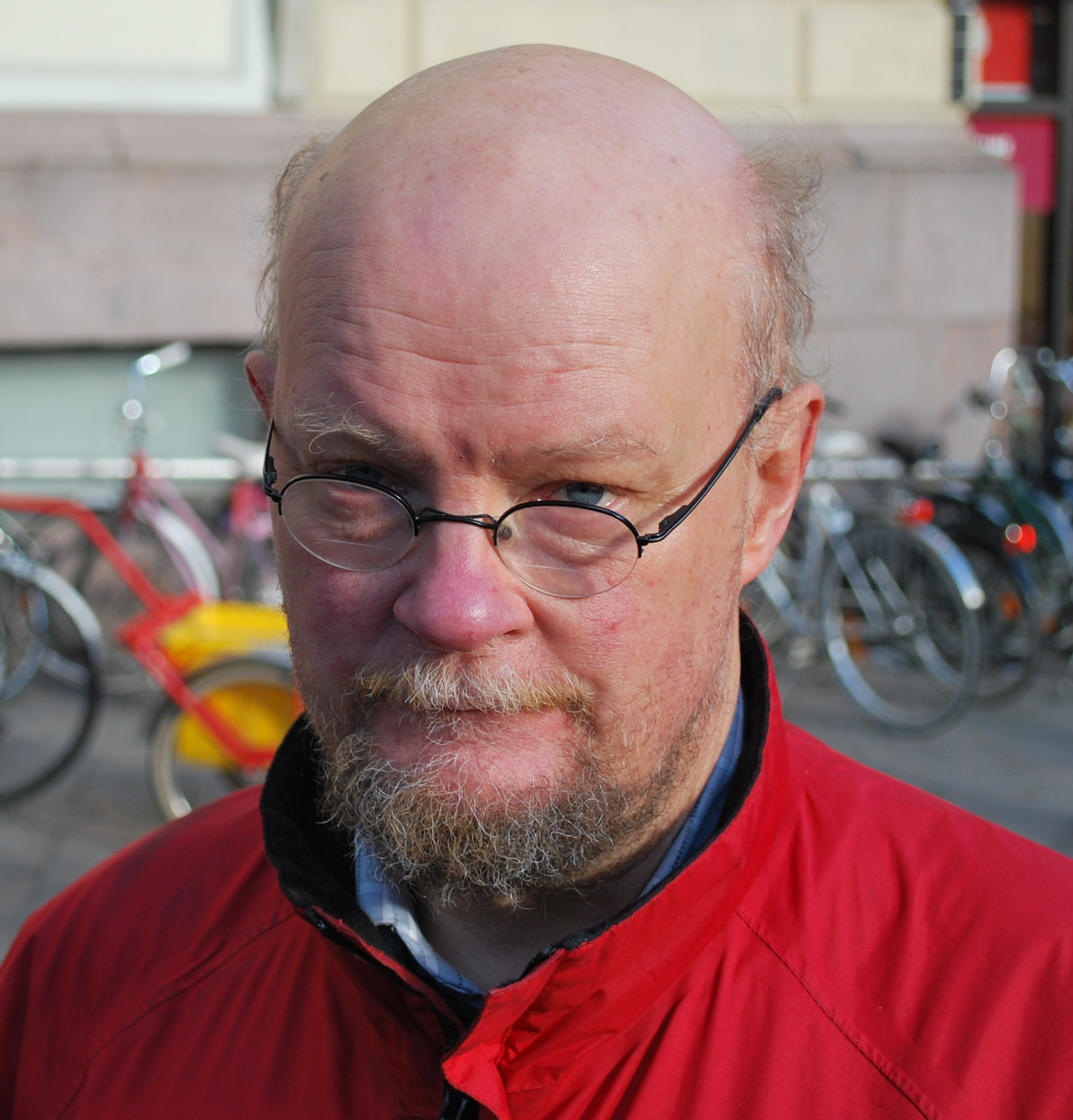
Osmo Soininvaara

Among the bigger political parties there are nowadays three main political forces for basic income in Finland, the Green League, the Left Alliance and the Centre Party. The leading advocates in Finland include Osmo Soininvaara, Green League, and Li Andersson (Left Alliance).

=== Denmark ===
The basic income-concept became known in Denmark in the late 1970s with the book Oprør fra midten. The following decades the debate continued, with some small victories for the movement, but nothing like a big break through. The Alternative political party supports a universal basic income.

=== Iceland ===
The basic income debate in Iceland in recent years is strongly linked to the recent rise of their Pirate Party, with Birgitta Jonsdottir as one of the front figures.

== History (year by year) ==
=== 1970s and 1980s ===
- 1970: Samuli Paronen, Finland, proposed basic income in a book.
- 1978: The basic income concept becomes well known in Denmark thanks to Oprør fra midten.
- 1980: The basic income idea is introduced to Finland in the book Finland in the 1980s, by Osmo Soininvaara and Osmo Lampinen.

=== 1990s ===
- 1990: Enhet, a small Swedish party, is founded.
- 1995: Lars Ekstrands Den befriade tiden is published.
- 1996: Ekstrands Arbetets död och medborgarlön, is published.

=== 2000s ===
- 2000: Erik Christensens Borgerlön – Fortaellinger om en politisk idé is published. Den nya sociala frågan, the Nordic basic income anthology where also Philippe Van Parijs contributes, also reach the public.

=== 2010s ===
- 2012: A Finnish basic income campaign starts on 28 March.
- 2014: In the months before the Swedish national election there were several articles in the press. Valter Mutt, Carl Schlyter, Annika Lillemets and Karin Jansson, Green Party, argued for basic income pilots both in cities and in rural areas. The former leader of the Centre Party in Finland, Juha Sipilä, pushed for the same in Finland.
