= Sakkinen =

Sakkinen or Säkkinen is a surname of Finnish origin. Notable people with the surname include:

- Riiko Sakkinen (born 1976), Finnish visual artist
- Sara Säkkinen (born 1998), Finnish ice hockey player
