= Valto Kokko =

Finnish artist (1933–2017)

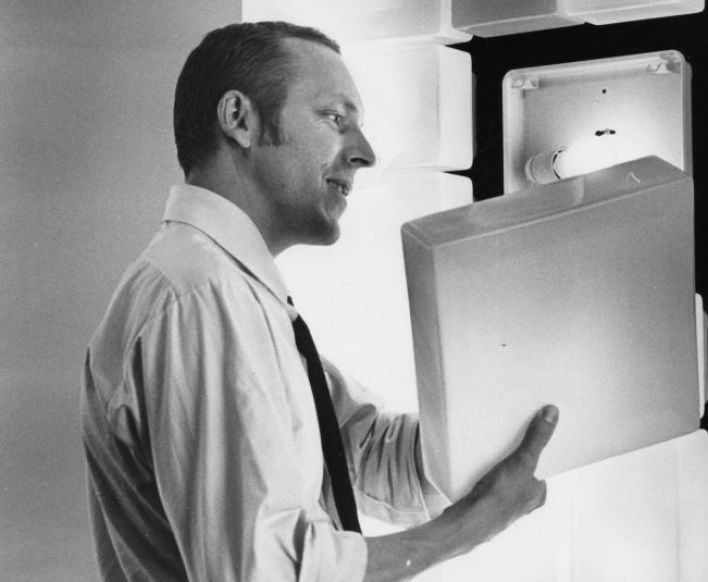
Valto Kokko

Valto Kokko (26 May 1933 – 25 May 2017) was a Finnish artist.

== Biography ==
Kokko was born on 26 May 1933. He studied at the Free Art School of Unto Pusa and the metal arts department of the Institute of Industrial Arts, in Finland, from 1958 until 1961.

In 1961, Kokko worked for Lohja OY Plastex Ab, a plastic lamp manufacturer. In 1963, he was hired by Iittala as a light fixture designer. In 1971 i-VALO, a new line of industrial lights was introduced. Kokko not only designed the entire range of i-VALO but as the new visual department manager he was also involved in advertising and exhibitions.

Kokko created his first extensive glassware set Avec in 1973. His best known set Otso is from 1978. Since 1981 Otso is part of the collection of the Museum of Modern Art in New York.

Kokko went on to create the films i-living with glass in 1979 and Vision in Glass in 1980. Both films became the industrial films of the year in Finland.

Other famous works from Kokko include Eleglans gold-plated and silver-plated ball lamps and the Saana vase.

Kokko died in Helsinki on 25 May 2017, at the age of 83.
