= Pepino, Spain =

Pepino
- municipality
- Coat of arms

- Location in Spain
- Coordinates: 40°1′53″N 4°48′12″W
- Country: Spain
- Autonomous community: Castile-La Mancha
- Province: Toledo
- Comarca: Sierra de San Vicente

Area
  - Total: 46 km^{2} (18 sq mi)
- Elevation: 454 m (1,490 ft)

Population (2025-01-01)
  - Total: 3,421
  - Density: 74/km^{2} (190/sq mi)
- Demonym: Pepinero/Pepinera
- Time zone: UTC+1 (CET)
  - Summer (DST): UTC+2 (CEST)
- Postal code: 45638

Pepino is a municipality in the province of Toledo, Castile-La Mancha, in central Spain. According to the 2017 census the municipality has a population of 2,809 inhabitants.

== Location ==
Pepino is located 9 km north of Talavera de la Reina and 84 km west of Toledo city. Historically it began to be populated in the 14th century, after the Moorish retreat from the area. Pepino was part of a shire (Señorío) of Talavera de la Reina belonging to the Archbishops of Toledo. Now it is part of the Talavera de la Reina judicial district.

This town lies in the comarca of Sierra de San Vicente, named after nearby Sierra de San Vicente range, part of the Central System.

== See also ==
- List of municipalities in Toledo
