= Aleksander von Kothen =

Finnish politician

Aleksander von Kothen (8 April 1867 – 26 March 1917) was a Finnish politician. He was a member of the Senate of Finland.
