= Valtteri Järviluoma =

Finnish ice hockey player

- Born: 29 January 1993 (age 32); Tampere, Finland
- Height: 5 ft 10 in (178 cm)
- Weight: 174 lb (79 kg; 12 st 6 lb)
- Position: Forward
- Shoots: Left
- 2. Divisioona team; Former teams: KJT Haukat; Ilves
- NHL draft: Undrafted
- Playing career: 2013–present

Valtteri Järviluoma (born 29 January 1993) is a Finnish ice hockey player. He is currently playing for KJT Haukat of the 2. Divisioona, the fourth-tier league in Finland.

Jarviluoma made his SM-liiga debut playing with Ilves during the 2012–13 SM-liiga season. He went on to play nine games for Ilves before his release in 2014.
