= Elna Kiljander =

Early Finnish female architect

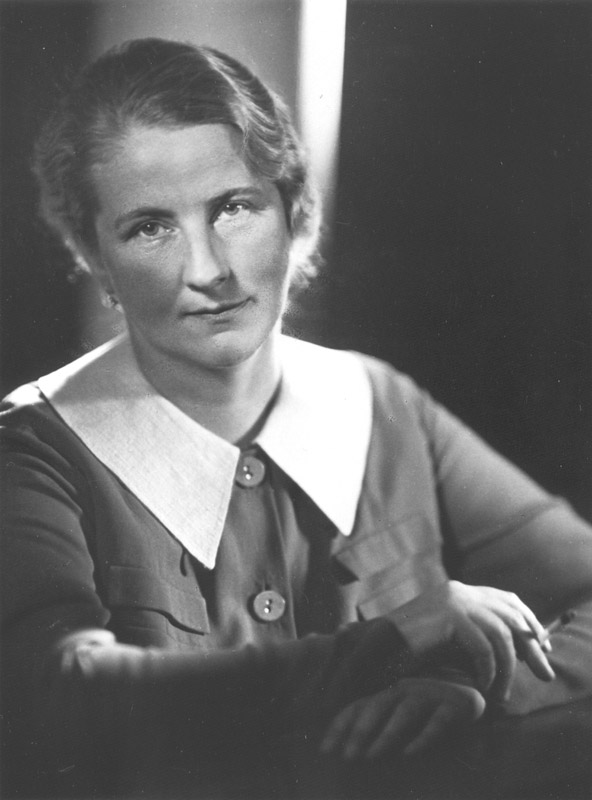
Elna Julia Sofia Kiljander

Elna Julia Sofia Kiljander (4 November 1889 – 21 March 1970) was one of Finland's earliest female architects. She is remembered not only for her model homes and kitchens but also for her furniture designs. One of her most important designs was the Functionalist Ensi-Koti home in Helsinki.

== Biography ==
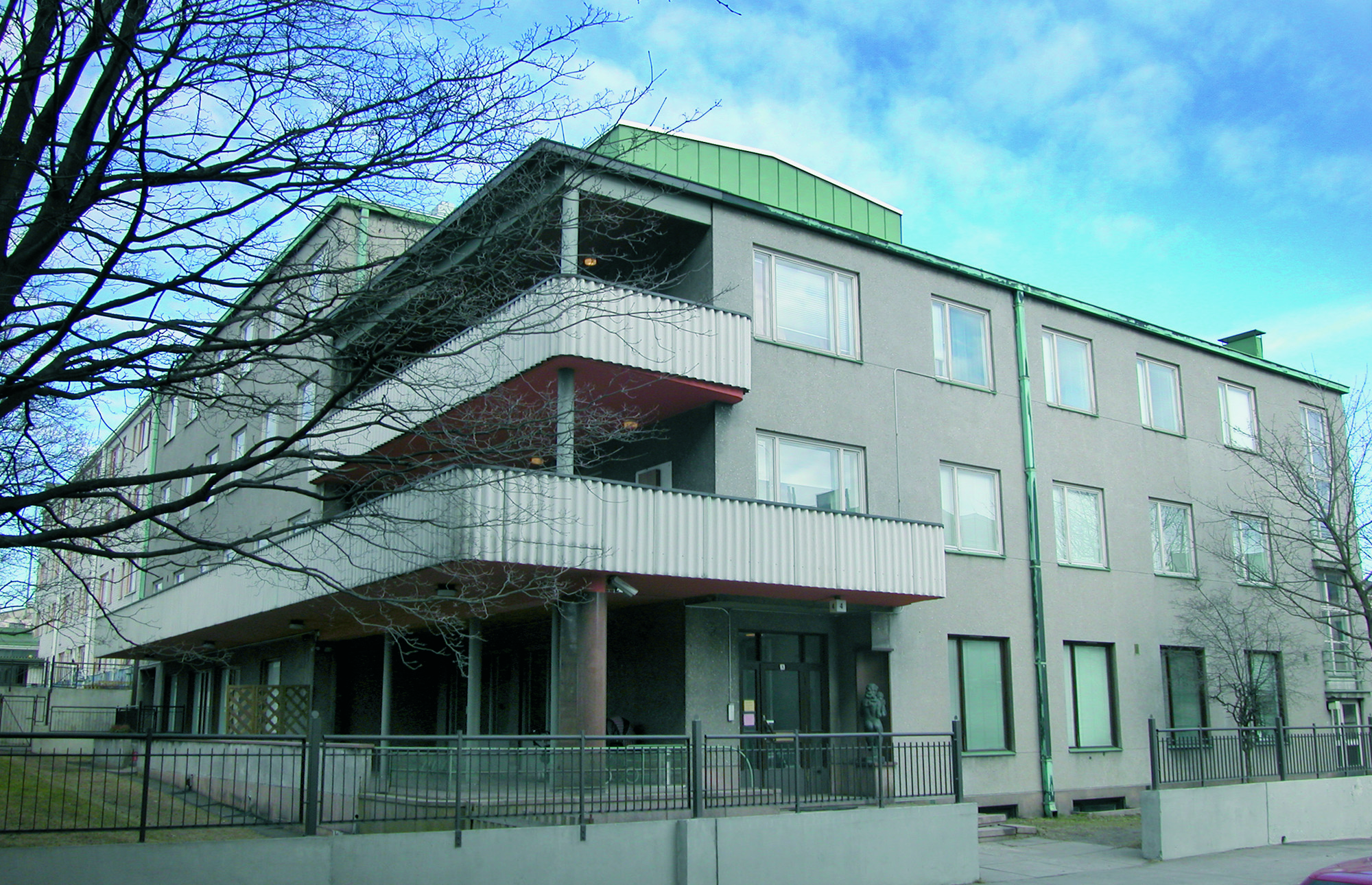
The Ensi-Koti home designed by Elna Kiljander

Born on 4 November 1889 in Sortavala, Elna Kiljander was the daughter of the music teacher Nikolai Nils Kilander and his Swedish-born wife Julia Svensson. After her father died in 1898, the family moved to Helsinki. She graduated as an architect from the Helsinki University of Technology in 1915 and went on to teach graphic design in Povenets in Russian Karelia, returning to Finland the following year.

Kiljander became interested in Functionalism when visiting the Stockholm Exhibition in 1930. She subsequently adopted the style in her housing designs as well as in the model kitchens she developed for the Martha Association. One of her most important works is the Ensi-Koti home for unmarried mothers and their children. Kiljander had herself become a single mother after a brief marriage with the sculptor Gunnar Finne from 1918 to 1926. In collaboration with the textile artist Marianne Strengell, she founded Koti-Hemmet, an interior design business where she designed furniture in a style closely resembling that adopted later by Alvar Aalto. Influenced by developments in Swedish design, her work exerted a significant impact on Finnish interior design in the 1930s. In 1949, her Koti-Hemmet firm declared bankruptcy, leading to Kiljander's retirement from architectural work.

Kiljander was a feminist, becoming a member of Architecta, the Finnish women's architecture association, from its establishment in 1942. Kiljander made an impressive contribution to the Finnish history of architecture.

Elna Kiljander died in Helsinki on 21 March 1970.
