= Juho Kanniainen =

Finnish politician

Juho Kanniainen (6 October 1875, Ii - 16 December 1929) was a Finnish farmer, lay preacher and politician. He was a member of the Parliament of Finland from 1922 to 1924, representing the Agrarian League.
