= Oiva Sala =

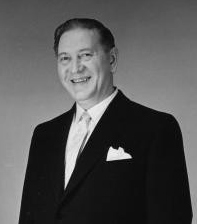

Oiva Arttur Sala (formerly Salin, October 31, 1900 - March 7, 1980) was a Finnish actor.

He had roles in 37 movies from the 1940s onwards.

He earned Order of the Lion of Finland award in 1958.

Sala was on a radioplay Knalli ja sateenvarjo just before his death.

== Partial filmography ==
- Kajastus (1930)
- Kersantilleko Emma nauroi? (1940) - Asko Nännimäinen
- Amor hoi! (1950) - Editor
- Isäpappa ja keltanokka (1950) - Miettinen, preparator
- Katarina kaunis leski (1950) - Tuomiokapitulin herra
- Rakkaus on nopeampi Piiroisen pässiäkin (1950) - Factor
- Sadan miekan mies (1951) - Nikko
- Silmät hämärässä (1952) - Sokea
- Rikollinen nainen (1952) - Pekka - vanginvartija
- Yhden yön hinta (1952) - Drunken
- Radio tulee hulluksi (1952) - Radio worker
- Lännen lokarin veli (1952) - Photographer
- Hän tuli ikkunasta (1952) - Monsieur Calle
- Niskavuoren Heta (1952) - Punakaartilainen (uncredited)
- Maailman kaunein tyttö (1953) - Editor
- Siltalan pehtoori (1953) - Hugo Mandelcrona
- Hilja, maitotyttö (1953) - 2. herra
- Laivan kannella (1954) - Kapakoitsija
- Onnelliset (1954) - 1st mister
- Minä ja mieheni morsian (1955) - Pierre
- Helunan häämatka (1955) - Sacristan
- Viisi vekkulia (1956) - Vicar Leevi Sammal
- Pikku Ilona ja hänen karitsansa (1957) - Parrakas mies
- Risti ja liekki (1957) - Mestari Petrus
- 1918 (1957) - Tuomiokapitulin jäsen
- Autuas eversti (1958) - Passenger on the train
- Pieni luutatyttö (1958) - Julius
- Lumisten metsien tyttö (1960) - Storekeeper Salkin
- Nuoruus vauhdissa (1961) - Director
- Kaasua, komisario Palmu! (1961) - Humalainen herrasmies
- Kultainen vasikka (1961) - Businessman
- Sissit (1963) - Luutnantti
- Totuus on armoton (1963) - Oitti
- Täällä Pohjantähden alla (1968) - Rovasti Wallen
