= Kerttu-Kaarina Suosalmi =

Finnish writer

Kerttu-Kaarina Suosalmi-Kardén
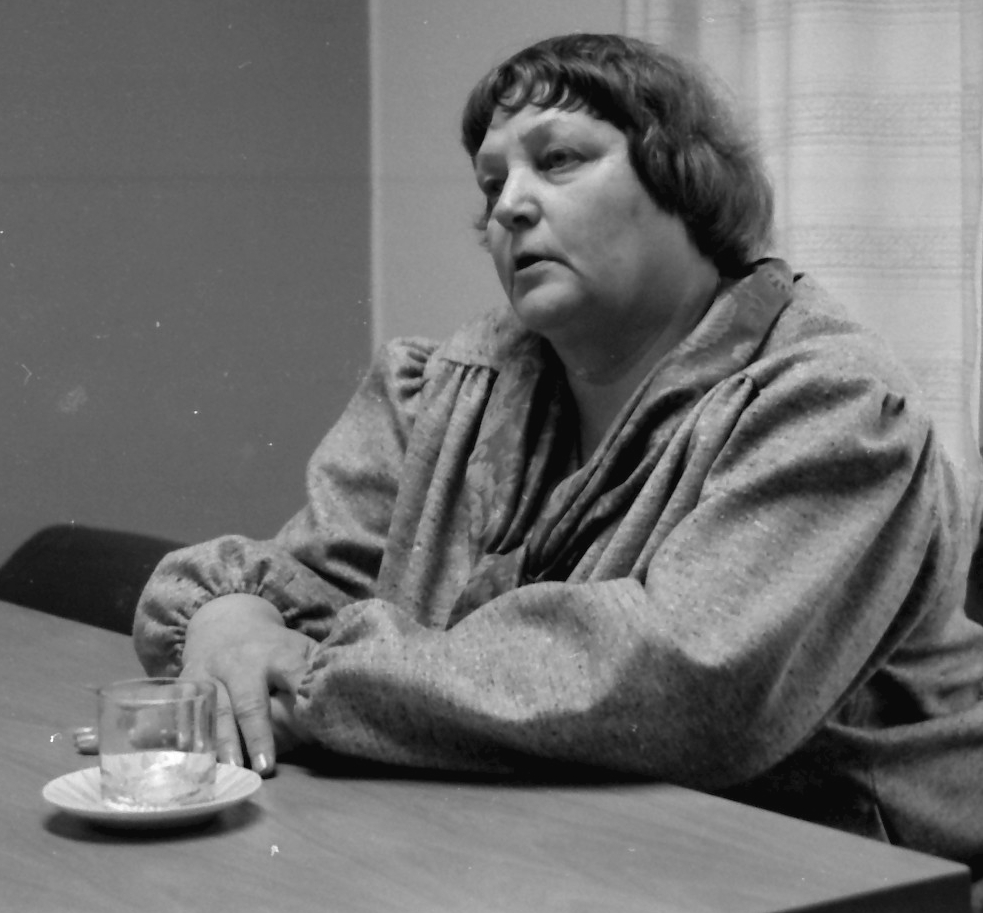
- Suosalmi in 1983
- Born: 9 September 1921; Lahti, Finland
- Died: 14 February 2001 (aged 79); Hollola, Finland
- Writing career
- Notable awards: Finnish State Prize for Literature (x 4); Aleksis Kivi Prize; Pro Finlandia medal
- Movement: Post-modern realism

Kerttu-Kaarina Suosalmi (9 September 1921 – 14 February 2001) was a Finnish author, best known for depicting the ordinary struggles of the 'everyman'.

== Works ==
Suosalmi's first two publications were poetry collections. After that, her other, over 20 works range from novels to short stories and fairytales, as well as stage plays and film scripts.

Her themes included the dark side of provincial life and of the welfare society, and the mental and physical struggles of ordinary people, often underneath the visible surface.

Her style has been described as rich and multi-layered, reminiscent of that of renaissance writers.

== Awards and recognition ==
Suosalmi won the Finnish State Prize for Literature four times, in 1970, 1977, 1983 ja 1989.

In 1976, she was awarded the Pro Finlandia medal of the Order of the Lion of Finland.

In 1993, Suosalmi received the Aleksis Kivi Prize of the Finnish Literature Society for her career achievements.

She was an honorary member of the Union of Finnish Writers.

== Personal life ==
Suosalmi qualified as a social worker in 1946. For a while she worked as a teacher, before embarking on her writing career full-time.

She was married to the painter Jorma Kardén, and the couple had one son. She died only a few weeks after her husband.
