= Kaj-Erik Relander =

Finnish businessman and investor (born 1962)

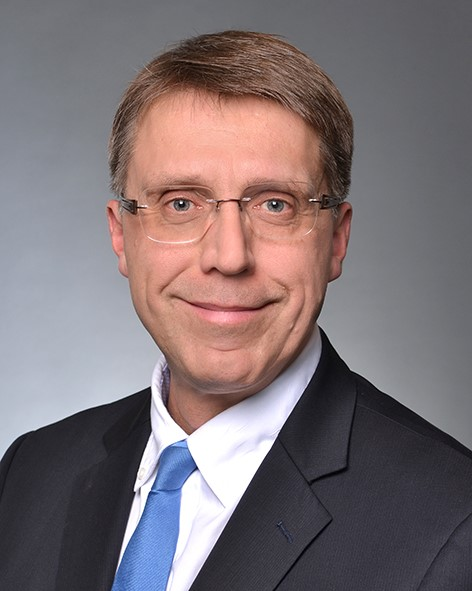
Kaj-Erik Relander, private investor and financial advisor

Kaj-Erik Relander (born 21 June 1962) is a Finnish businessman and investor. He became well-down during his short tenure as the CEO of the Finnish telecommunications company Sonera, during which the company lost over 3 billion euros as a result of unsuccessful deals in German UMTS licences, Currently he is a board member at DU - telecom operator in Dubai, UAE. Relander is a board member at BookIT Oy, which is a Finnish mobile transactions SaaS-company, member of the board at SES, a satellite operator in Luxembourg, member of the board at Starzplay Arabia, a streaming video service operating in Middle East and North Africa. Advisory board memberships include Limestone, which is a Finnish cloud based service platform for fund managers and Mustard Seed, a London-based impact investment fund and advisory services company.

Relander is a founding partner of SEQ Capital Partners, a technology and internet services investment partnership based in Zurich, Switzerland. He is working as a senior independent with Mubadala Development Company, which is the Sovereign Wealth Fund of Abu Dhabi Government. Relander holds the chairmanship of Investment Committee at Apis Partners, which is a private equity fund focusing on fintech for midmarket in Africa and Asia. Additionally he works as an independent advisor to certain family offices in Abu Dhabi and Zurich.

Relander is keen supporter of charity work and serves as a Chairman at Refugees United Foundation.

From 2009 to 2013, Relander worked as a Chief Investment Officer for Emirates Investment Authority (EIA), which is the Sovereign Wealth Fund of UAE Federal Government. From 2006 to 2009, Relander worked for the venture capital firm Accel Partners in London.

He is best known for his tenure in the Finnish telecommunications company Sonera, where he was CEO for six months in 2001 before forced to resign after the company lost billions of euros due to unsuccessful deals in UMTS licenses. In 2002, Sonera merged with the Swedish telecommunications company Telia.

In 2005, Relander was convicted by a Finnish court of having violated communications privacy laws between 1997 and 2001, with the court finding he had ordered an unlawful review of employee phone logs in order to determine who had leaked confidential company information to media. More than 80 Sonera employees, including several board members, had been cited as plaintiffs in the case, in which six senior Sonera executives were charged.
