= Maija-Liisa Friman =

Finnish business executive (born 1952)

Maija-Liisa Friman (born 1952) is a Finnish business executive who has served on the boards of several Finnish companies. In recent years, the Finnish weekly magazine Talouselämä has listed her as one of the most powerful Finnish women in business.

== Biography ==
Friman attended the Helsinki University of Technology where she graduated in technology and chemical engineering in 1978. Since the mid-1980s, she has been involved in the areas of production, customer service and general management. As of September 2015, she is chair of the waste management company Ekokem and vice-chair of Neste, an oil refining company. She is a board member of Finnair, where she also sits on the audit committee, and a member of the board of the iron ore specialist, LKAB. Since 2009, she has actively contributed to Boardman, a Finnish executive management support company.

Over the years Friman has served as an executive in the public and private sectors. She has held senior positions at Metso Minerals, Empower, SYK, Finnish Industry Investment, Finish Medical Foundation, Valmet Technologies, Helsinki Deaconess Institute Foundation, Helsinki University of Technology, Ilmarinen Mutual Pension Insurance, Aspocomp, Vattenfall, Gyproc, Kemira, Talvivaara Mining, Metso, TeliaSonera, Sponda and Rautaruukki.
