= Knud Möller =

Finnish journalist (1919–1993)

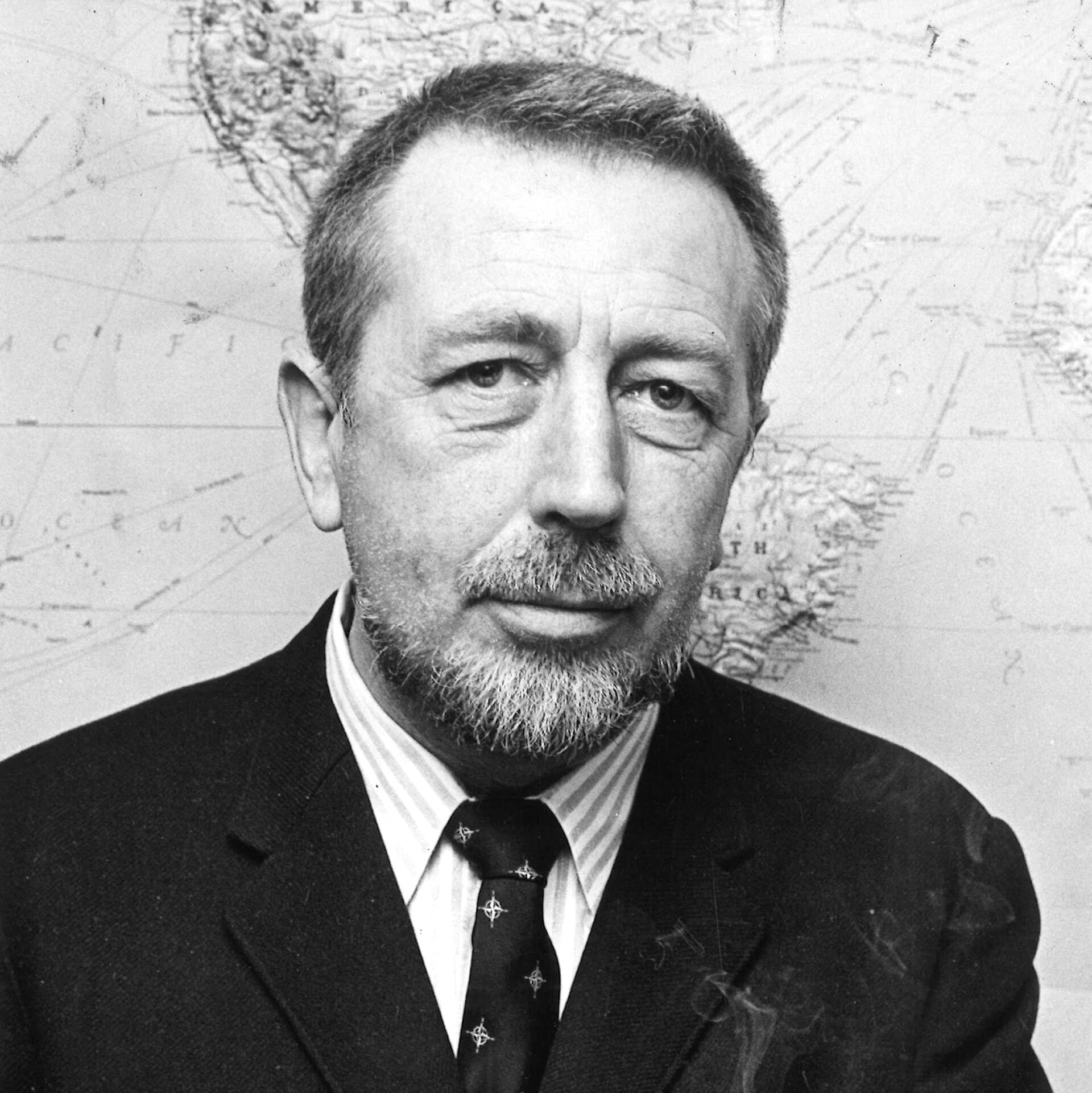
Knud Möller in the 1970s

Knud Albert Möller (17 January 1919 – 23 April 1993 Helsinki) was a Finnish Yle radio correspondent until 1983. Möller worked as a correspondent in the front during the Continuation War. After the war he was a long-time correspondent in Copenhagen.

== Background ==
Möller was born in Helsinki to Danish parents. His mother Agnes Hansine Caroline Möller (née Birn) was born in Helsingør in 1890 and father Kaj Adam Gottlieb Möller was born in 1882 in Copenhagen. His mother's family were originally from Mecklenburg, German Empire and immigrated to Denmark in 1854. Knud's father Kaj was studying catering in Saint Petersburg during the end of the 19th century.

Kaj Möller returned to Denmark in 1907 and married Agnes Birn. They moved to Saint Petersburg where he worked as a chef in a hotel. During the Russian Revolution in 1917 they moved to Helsinki.

Knud was born there in 1919 and lived in his youth in Käkisalmi and Viipuri.

== Career ==
Möller worked as a journalist in 1939 when he graduated from high school. Möller was born as Danish citizen and did not take a Finnish citizenship until in the 1970s. He took part in the Winter War as one of about 1,200 Danish volunteers.

During the war, he was also a journalist in Sweden and Denmark. When television became part of mass media in Finland in the 1960s, Yle hired him as a correspondent because of his very good language skills and knowing international subjects.

Möller worked as a correspondent in Paris from 1966 to 1969 and in East Berlin from 1974 to 1978. Möller retired in 1983. After this he worked as a freelancer in Radio Ykkönen.

During the Conference on Security and Co-operation in Europe which was held in Helsinki in 1975, Möller interrupted the Soviet press occasion mentioning that there were spoken five languages in the city of Viipuri (which Finland had lost to the Soviet Union after the war) and now only one.

Möller was fluent in many languages and as age of five he spoke five languages including his mother tongue Danish, Finnish, Swedish, Norwegian, German, English, French, Spanish and Russian.
