= Gunnar Finne =

Finnish sculptor

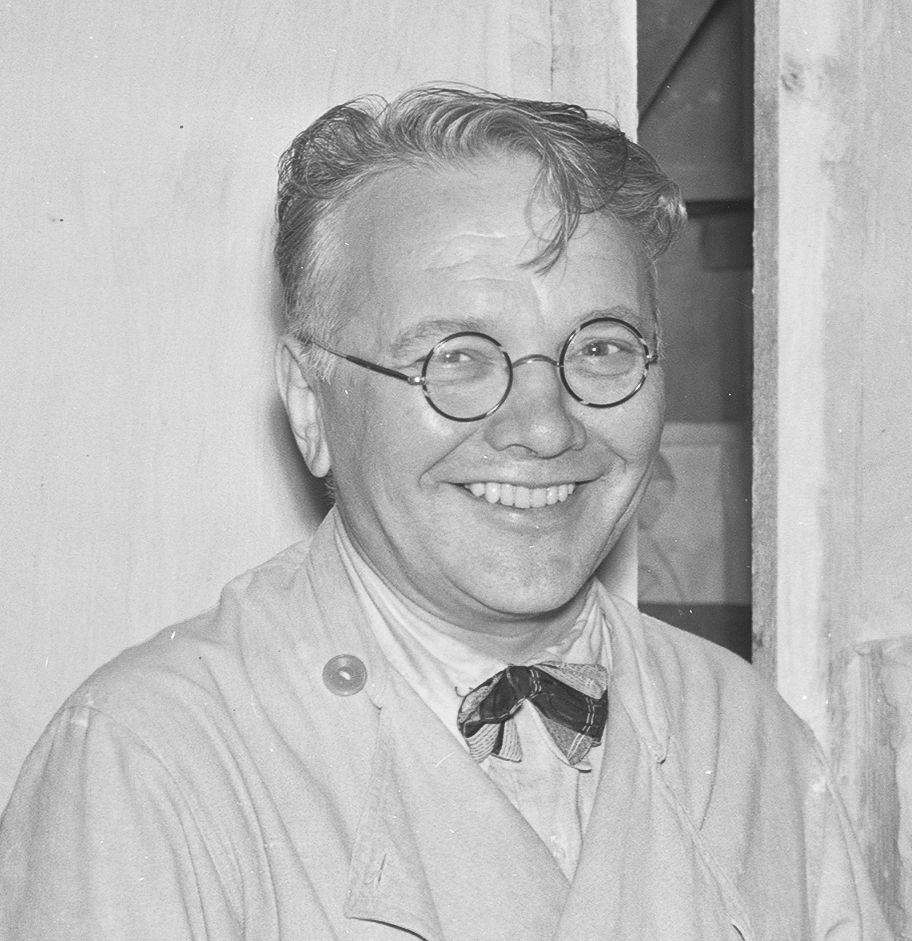
Gunnar Finne in 1939.

Johan Gunnar Finne (4 April 1886 – 17 September 1952) was a Finnish sculptor. The architect Elna Kiljander became a single mother after a brief marriage with Finne from 1918 to 1926.

Finne's best-known work is the memorial for the author Zachris Topelius in Helsinki. Finne entered the memorial competition arranged in 1928 with an entry titled "Fact and Fable" and won the competition. The finished bronze sculpture was unveiled in 1932 in the Esplanadi Park in central Helsinki.

His other works include war heroes statues in Hollola (1941), Karkkila (1948) and Jyväskylä (1922).

Finne was awarded the Pro Finlandia medal in 1951.
