= Taito Kantonen =

American academic and theologian (1900–1993)

- Born: Taito A. Kantonen; 24 April 1900; Karstula, Finland
- Died: 26 April 1993 (aged 93); Springfield, Ohio, U.S.
- Education: Harvard University

Taito A. Kantonen (24 April 1900 – 26 April 1993) was an American academic and theologian.

== Early life and education ==
Kantonen was born in Karstula, Finland, the son of David and Elli Kantonen. At the age of three, he moved to the United States, where he later attended Harvard University and received a degree in theology.

== Career ==
Kantonen was a professor of systematic theology in Hamma Divinity School (now Trinity Lutheran Seminary) from 1932 to 1968. He received an honorary doctorate in theology from the University of Helsinki in 1955. Kantonen wrote many books, including Man in the Eyes of God.

== Death ==
Kantonen died in Springfield, Ohio on 26 April 1993, two days after his 93rd birthday.
