= Mikko Siivikko =

Finnish footballer (born 1986)

Mikko Siivikko (born 8 June 1986) is a Finnish former professional football goalkeeper who played for AC Oulu, Kajaanin Haka, Oullun Palloseura, and most recently Oulun Työväen Palloilijat.
