= Jukka Nevakivi =

Finnish historian (1931–2024)

Jukka Taneli Nevakivi (8 October 1931 – 15 January 2024) was a Finnish historian.

== Life and career ==
Jukka Nevakivi was born in Pudasjärvi on 8 October 1931. He studied at the University of London, completing his Ph.D. in 1963. Nevakivi was a journalist between 1954 and 1963 for Kaleva and Suomen Kuvalehti. Between 1963 and 1979 he served in the Finnish foreign département in Budapest, Cairo and Paris. In 1980-95 he was professor in political history at Helsinki University.

He published Britain, France, and the Middle East, 1914-1920 in 1968, highlighting the development of Anglo-French relations in the Middle East during the peace settlement of 1919. He also wrote extensively about dramatic events in the Finnish republic's history. Amongst his publications are Muurmannin legioona (1970), The appeal that was never made (1976), which is about the Western allies during the Finnish Winter War, and Ystävistä vihollisiksi (1976), about Finland in British politics after the Winter War. He also wrote some studies about the years after the Second World War, including Zdanov Suomessa (1995) and Miten Kekkonen pääsi valtaan ja Suomi suomettui (1996). In 2000 he wrote another book about the relationship between the Western allies and Finland during the Winter War, Apu jota ei annettu.

Nevakivi died on 15 January 2024, at the age of 92.

== Sources ==
- Uppslagsverket Finland, 3 (2005)
