= Riiko Sakkinen =

Finnish visual artist (born 1976)

Riiko Sakkinen (born in 1976, Helsinki) is a visual artist. He currently lives in Pepino, Toledo, Spain.

== Biography ==
Sakkinen is the founder of Turbo Realism; an art movement that uses critical irony, provocation and intervention as means of addressing sociopolitical and economic issues of the modern capitalist world through visual arts. Turbo Realism aims to pinpoint the irony within commercial and political structures and actions through reconstructing familiar imagery and multilingual vocabulary into a new combination of refined and truthful meaning beyond their original commercial use. The result is often a painting or a drawing, containing slogan-like statements, that seems joyful and ordinary at the surface but has an ironic intention of creating a feeling that something is indeed horribly wrong with the world. Sakkinen has stated his view on art through the words of Pablo Picasso: ”The art is not made to decorate rooms. It is an offensive weapon in the defence against the enemy.”

In addition to his works on canvas and paper, Sakkinen has actively created installations, interventions and happenings as well as designed objects that combine multiple media. He has held numerous solo and group shows in Europe and The United States and his works are included in the permanent collection of The Museum of Modern Art, New York, Amos Anderson Art Museum and Kiasma Museum of Contemporary Art, Helsinki. Among his most recent activity is the Rikhardinkatu Public Library intervention in Helsinki, Finland called ”Riiko Sakkinen's Favorite Books”.

== Riiko Sakkinen's Favorite Books ==
On 11 February 2013, Sakkinen hid 200 five euro notes between pages of personally chosen anonymous books and notified of the event in his blog. This attracted extensive local media coverage and public interest. The intervention lasts an indefinite amount of time - until every numbered and autographed bill is found. The artist personally has stated, that this work is ”an homage to libraries, literature, books and reading”.
