= Pepe Jürgens =

Pepe Jürgens is a Finnish sports commentator and artist. He commentates Veikkausliiga's matches for Nelonen Sport. Jürgens has also hosted a sports programme for Nelonen called Urheiluaamu (trans. A sports morning) and commentated sport events for now a defunct Finnish radio channel Sport FM Jürgens is very famous and (debatably) popular in Finland. He was a champion racewalker in upper secondary school and was considered for preliminary Olympic training. His racewalking career ended due to a training accident involving his racewalking teammates and a water vole where he tore his Achilles tendon and bruised his orbital bone. In sport, Jürgens is often the subject of humour, amongst other things, because of his curly hair at the back of his head.
