= Osmo Soininvaara =

Finnish politician and writer

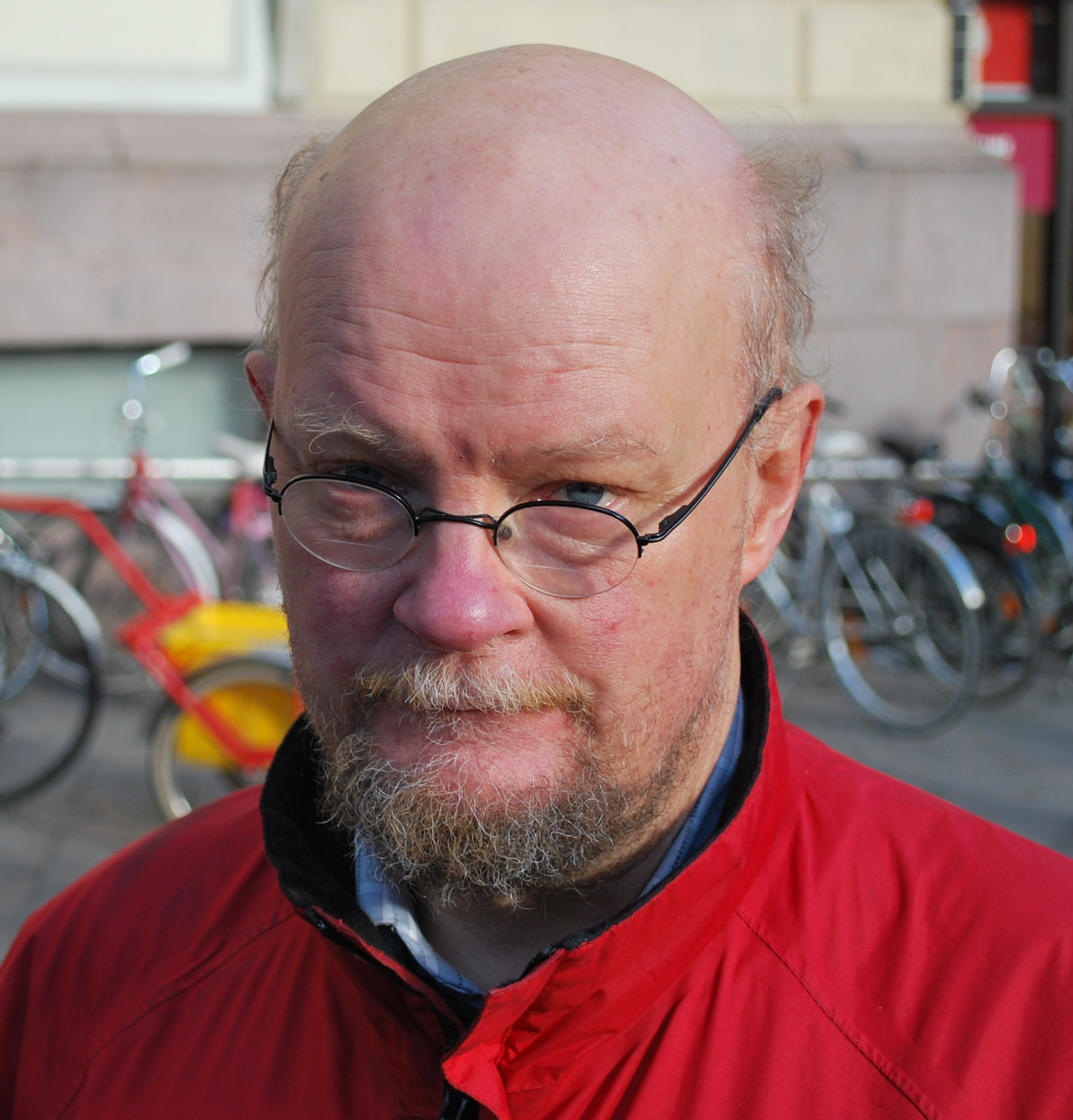
- Soininvaara in October 2008

Member of the Parliament of Finland
- In office: 1987–1991; 1995–2007; 2011–2015

Minister of Social Services
- In office 14 April 2000 – 19 April 2002
- Prime Minister: Paavo Lipponen

Personal details
- Born: 2 September 1951 (age 75) Helsinki, Finland
- Party: Green League

Osmo Heikki Kristian Soininvaara (born 2 September 1951 in Helsinki) is a Finnish politician and writer, former party leader and cabinet member.

== Personal life ==
Soininvaara has a licentiate degree in statistics.

Soininvaara is married to Anna-Maria Soininvaara and they have three children.

== Political life ==
Soininvaara was elected in Helsinki city council in 1985 and has served in various positions of trust in the city administration since then. He was elected in Eduskunta in 1987 and again in 1995 and was a member of parliament until 2007, when he chose not to stand for re-election. After a break he was elected to the parliament again in 2011, serving until 2015.

He served as Minister of Social Services in Paavo Lipponen's second cabinet between 14 April 2000 and 19 April 2002. He was the leader of the Finnish Green League party from 2001 to 2005.

== See also ==
- Universal basic income in the Nordic countries

Party political offices
Preceded by Satu Hassi	Chairperson of the Green League; 2001–2005	Succeeded by Tarja Cronberg
