= Otto Maja =

Finnish street artist

- Born: 1987 (age 38–39); Helsinki, Finland
- Known for: Graphic Design, drawing, street art

Otto Maja (born 1987) is a Finnish street artist living and working in Helsinki. He is known for translating the visual language cultivated on the streets into illustrations, paintings and drawings. His works have been exhibited in several locations around Finland, most recently in Pori Art Museum together with such internationally renowned street artists as Blu and Invader.

== History ==
Otto Maja's mural in Pori (2013).

At the age of twelve Maja's interest towards drawing was triggered by his babysitter's boyfriend, a graffiti artist. In the years that followed, Maja learned how to master urban canvases, developing a good sense of space which is reflected in his illustrations and drawings. Between 1998 and 2008, Helsinki had a zero tolerance policy in regards to street art, enforced with private security contractors. In this atmosphere many artists, including Maja, needed to develop both stealth and methods to create pieces quickly - stickers, stencils and paste-ups.

After years of battling with the authorities, Maja decided to leave Helsinki to study graphic design at a folk high school in Anjalankoski, ending up teaching it for another year at the same institute. After living and working in the countryside of Jurva for some years, Maja returned to Helsinki. Throughout the years, he has held several successful exhibitions all around Finland, for example in Seinäjoki, Helsinki, Pori and Kouvola . In the field of graphic design, he is known for designing flyers for clubs and other events.

In order to promote Finnish street art, Maja set up the Nimi Collective in 2010. It continues to regularly exhibit the works of Finnish street artists online. In 2012 Nimi collective grew into an art agency called Omanimi that continues to produce commissioned artworks. In the summer of 2013, Maja painted the biggest mural by a Finnish artist, in Pori, Finland.

== Exhibitions ==
- 2008 Ystävästä, Kouvola's Head library
- 2009 Vapaalinja, Mbar, Helsinki
- 2009 Lasipalatsi Design Markets, Lasipalatsi, Helsinki
- 2010 Naamakerroin, Still Standing, Seinäjoki
- 2010 Street n Beat, Stache 1, Seinäjoki
- 2011 Wildlife, Lasipalatsi, Helsinki
- 2011 Rikoskumppani, Geezers the shop, Helsinki
- 2011 For the Name of Mosquitoes, Cafe Talo, Helsinki
- 2012 Street Art - The next Generation, Pori Art Museum, Pori
- 2012 Behind the Curtain, Make your mark, Helsinki
- 2012 Two pens, Gallery Bertta, Kotka
- 2012 Street Art - The Next Generation, Kunsthallen Brandts, Odense
- 2013 Omanimi Opening - Nimikollektiv, Omanimi, Helsinki
- 2013 Charta, Omanimi, Helsinki
- 2013 Reunion of Blind People, 931, Tampere
- 2013 The Art of Slaughter, group exhibition, Teurastamo, Helsinki
- 2013 This is FIECEL!, group exhibition with Emmi Mustonen, Sanomatalo, Helsinki
- 2013 Resident Artist, Flow Festival
- 2015 Better is ruining the good 1/3, Rupla, Helsinki
- 2015 Better is ruining the good 2/3, Mothership Of Work (Artist residency)
- 2016 Better is ruining the good 3/3, Galleria Tiuku (exhibition of the year)
- 2020 Bad Human, Gallery Helsinki Urban Art
