= Abiola Bamijoko =

Macedonian footballer (born 2005)

Personal information
- Date of birth: 14 March 2005 (age 21)
- Place of birth: Helsinki, Finland
- Height: 1.94 m (6 ft 4 in)
- Position: Centre-back

Team information
- Current team: Tallinna Kalev
- Number: 45

Youth career
- 2014–2022: HJK
- 2018–2019: → PK-35 (loan)
- 2021: → Puotinkylän Valtti (loan)
- 2022: PPJ
- 2022–2023: Sampdoria
- 2024: Sønderjyske

Senior career*
Years	Team	Apps	(Gls)
2023–2024	HIFK	10	(0)
2024	Junkeren	6	(0)
2025	AFC Eskilstuna	11	(0)
2025–	Tallinna Kalev	8	(0)

International career^{‡}
2022	North Macedonia U17	2	(0)
2022–2023	North Macedonia U18	6	(0)
2023	North Macedonia U19	1	(0)
- * Club domestic league appearances and goals as of 17 November 2025 ‡ National team caps and goals as of 11 October 2023

Abiola "Abi" Bamijoko (Macedonian: Абиола "Аби" Бамијоко; born 14 March 2005) is a professional footballer who plays as a centre-back for Estonian Meistriliiga club Tallinna Kalev. Born in Finland, he represents North Macedonia internationally.

== Career ==
Bamijoko was born in Helsinki, Finland, to a Nigerian father and a mother of Macedonian and Turkish descent from Resen. He speaks Finnish, Macedonian, Serbian, English, and Italian. Bamijoko began his football career at a young age in Finland, joining a youth team HJK at the age of 6. He was called up to the North Macedonia Youth Team after turning 16. Bamijoko's started in a U-17 game in May 2022 against Austria, which helped cement his place in Macedonian youth team. His career then took him to Italy, where he joined Italian club Sampdoria's U18 squad. This stint in Italy was a transformative period for Bamijoko, where he was able to develop further as a player. In 2023, he joined to the Finnish club Helsinki IFK for the 2023 season.

== Personal life ==
Beyond football, Bamijoko embraces his multicultural background, drawing from his Nigerian, Macedonian, Turkish, and Finnish heritage.
