= Teppo Turkki =

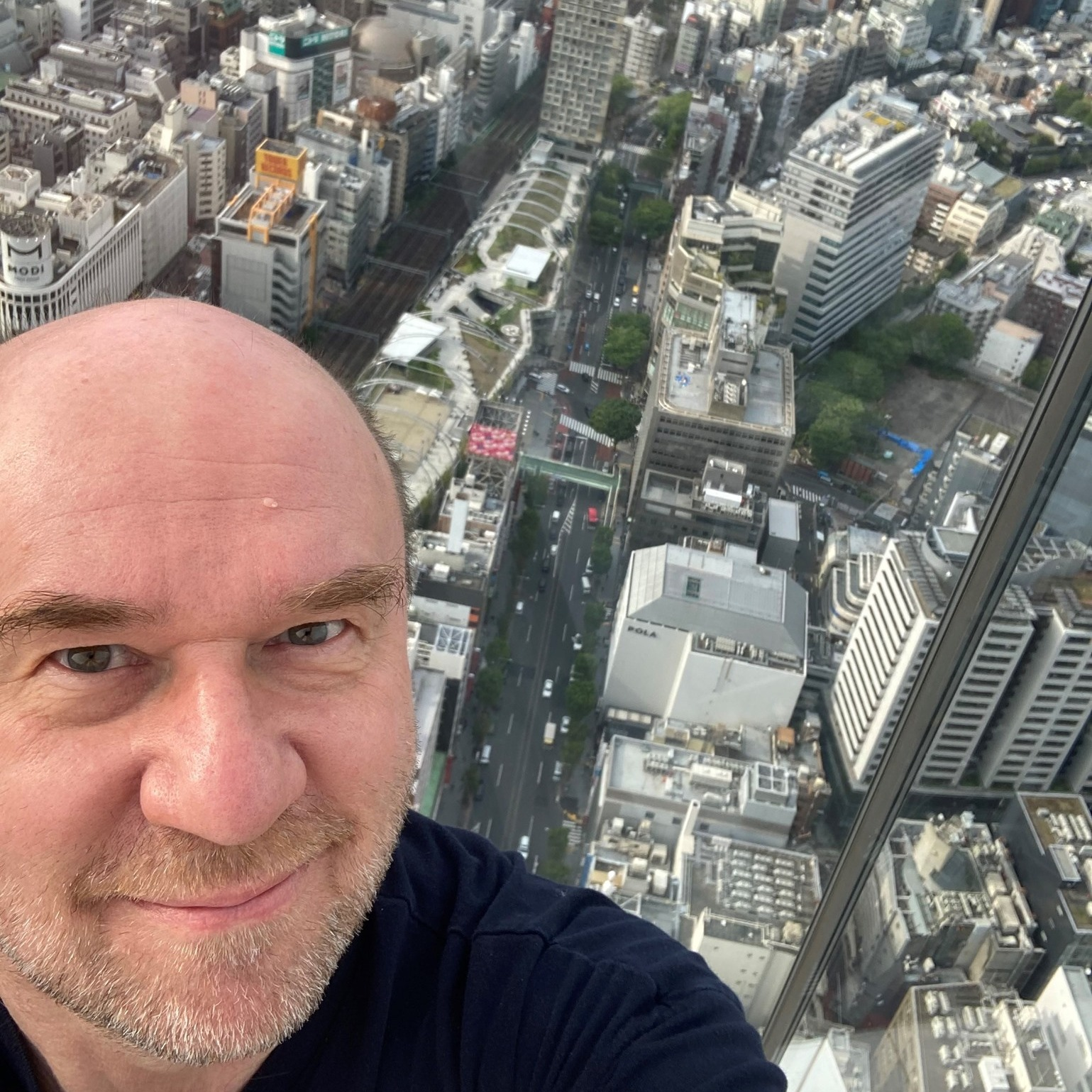
Teppo Turkki

Teppo Turkki (born 29 October 1958), a native of Finland has been working with his visions and insights into the future of many aspects of information society, culture, media and our daily lives. He is also a specialist for development of ICT, culture industries and economics and change in the societies in East Asia, especially in Japan and Korea. He works as the head of the Finland’s Trade and Innovation Office Finpro. In this post, he is effectively the de facto representative of Finland in Taiwan.

== Career ==
Teppo Turkki initially worked as a researcher in SITRA (1996–1998), then worked as an Executive Adviser for the CEO from Elisa Corporation, a leading nationwide communications group in Finland (1998–2003). In this position he learned how the digital culture may influence the creation of individual identities and the establishment of diverse groups. Earlier he worked as director of the audiovisual journalism programme in the Department of Film and Television, at the University of Art and Design in Helsinki.

He was a visiting scholar in Waseda University (2003–05) in Tokyo. Turkki is also a Research Fellow for the Centre for Global Communications at the International University of Japan (2005–07). Turkki currently serves as an expert in many committees of the Ministries of Finland, including: Advisory Committee of Creative Industries, Ministry of Employment and Trade, Council of Research, SITRA The Finnish National Fund for Research and Development, Finnish National Commission for UNESCO, Chairman of the Committee for Communication and Media, Cultural Forum of Council of State, Advisory Committee of Information Technology, Ministry of Education, Member of the Board of Governors, Finnish Broadcasting Company.

His last post in Finland was as a director of the Institute for Art, Development and Education for art universities of Finland (2005–2008).

== Publications ==
Turkki wrote a book about Japan, Kahdeksan pilven takaa – Japanin murros ja uusi nousu, EDITA (2005), and a book about digital culture titled Minuus Mediassa- Uusia Identiteettejä Metsästämässä (1998).

== Other activities ==
Although Turkki has been politically nonpartisan, he was influential in the alternative movements such as the Koijärvi Movement during the 1980s, which eventually resulted in the formation of the Green League.

Turkki was one of the founders of Finland's first local radio station, Radio City, and has worked as a journalist and columnist in Finland's leading media providers. He has also directed and written several documentary programmes and extensive serials for TV and radio. He is a founder Kan Sei Consulting Ltd, where he currently works as an executive director and researcher.
