= Seppo Hentilä =

Finnish historian

Seppo Juhani Hentilä (10 April 1948 in Oulu), is a Finnish historian.

Hentilä was 1980–98 docent in political history at Helsinki University and became 1998 professor in the subject of matter. He has studied the DDR-Finnish relations and Finnish athletics history. Amongst his productions can be found Suomen työläisurheilun historia (3 parts, 1982–87), Kaksi Saksaa ja Suomi (2003) and several academic textbooks.

In 2007 to 2008 Hentilä was a visiting professor in the Berlin's Humboldt University. Hentilä has also written about the Swedish working class movement and social democracy: Den svenska arbetarklassen och reformismens genombrott inom SAP före 1914: arbetarklassens ställning, strategi och ideologi (1979). This study is also translated to English.
