= Sampsa (street artist) =

Finnish street artist

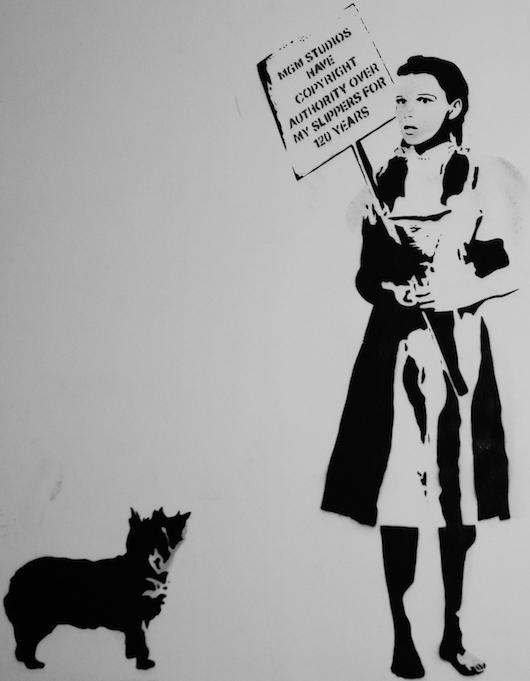
- A Sampsa stencil critiqueing the Copyright Term Extension Act
- Born: 1979 (age 46–47)
- Education: TUAS
- Known for: Graffiti; Street art Satire; Social commentary
- Website: Sampsa Sipilä on Instagram

Sampsa is a pseudonymous Finnish street artist, political activist, and painter, whose known works have appeared in Helsinki, Palermo, New Orleans, and Paris. Referred to as the 'Finnish Banksy', his works have at times been mistaken for Banksy's. Sampsa's work is distinguished for its focus on political activism, launching citizen's initiatives as an integral component of his work. He has also innovated in the creation of removable street art, painting on tiles and canvases made of industrial fabrics, and mounting them on the street. Sampsa's first known public artworks emerged in Helsinki, and coincided with his starting a Finnish popular movement for a more fair copyright law.

== Career ==
=== 2012 ===
==== Common Sense in Copyright ====
Sampsa's work first emerged in Helsinki, Finland, with some of the first pieces attacking the Lex Karpela amendment, which increased the severity of punishments for copyright infringement in Finland.

Coinciding with the appearance of the street art, Sampsa started an initiative for the repeal of Lex Karpela, named Common Sense in Copyright. Sampsa worked with the Finnish Electronic Frontier Foundation on the initiative, which successfully obtained the 50,000 votes required to cause the Finnish Parliament to consider the proposed law, using the new Finnish Open Ministry.

"We’ve begun working closely with European Digital Rights members globally to ensure that when the vote hits the floor in 2014, the pressure is still on, so copyright law will be changed forever."

Artwork by Sampsa joined works by well-known Finnish artists Jani Leinonen and Riiko Sakkinen in a gallery exhibition spreading awareness of the campaign. The exhibition's title, Exhibition 49,999, came from the need for 50,000 signatures to activate a parliamentary response. The campaign also organized a website blackout day, 23 April 2013, to publicize the citizens' initiative, inspired by the 2011 Wikipedia SOPA blackout campaign. This campaign led to Finland becoming "the first country in the world in which Parliament will vote on a 'fairer' copyright law that has been crowdsourced by the public", and has been described as 'the first time street art catalyzed a change in law'.

==== Other 2012 works ====
In a 2012 interview with Finnish magazine Voima, Sampsa toured his recent Helsinki artworks and explained their context. He explained a piece titled Spineless SAFA, depicting the Finnish Association of Architects as pigs, lending to speculation that he might have been trained as an architect. Sampsa said of the piece, "Helsinki's zoning of Töölo Lake is one of our generation's largest blunders.".

In another piece, titled Vaino, Sampsa conflates Diego Fernández de Cevallos, a wealthy Mexican politician and lawyer kidnapped in 2010, with Väinämöinen, a central character in Finnish folklore. Sampsa said of the piece:

"Three years of investigation into SOK and Kesko's illegal communications show they raised food prices substantially faster than inflation. Why won't the authorities address these central trading abuses? ... What is the price of our lives? How much longer will large central corporations be allowed to rip us off?"

Another piece, Wheres a Zabludowicz When U Need One, criticizes the Finnish and EU art establishment, calling out a wealthy art collector by name:

"While Finland's richest citizen, Poju Zabludowicz ... is a major art collector, his works include only a few Finnish artists. At the same time, as he hoovers the London galleries, native art collectors and the local culture are dying, due to lack of community support. Even JP Morgan, the Rockefellers, and the Vanderbilts supported the local culture through philanthropy."

=== 2013 ===
==== Paris ====
===== HAPODI =====
In 2013, Sampsa works began appearing in Paris, many of them targeting the HADOPI law "promoting the distribution and protection of creative works on the internet". In an interview, Sampsa derided the law as hypocritical:

"In Finland, as in France, the TTVK (Finnish HADOPI) and HADOPI are hypocritical laws, created for the benefit of the few. Data exchange scares the entertainment industry because it allows artists to connect directly with the consumer. The money spent on these laws, with the costs of sending warning letters by mail, could be invested in something else, such as university media research laboratories, to create a platform for sharing with direct compensation for the artists. ... The evidence is in: in France, HADOPI is doomed to disappear."

In 2014, Paris city workers removed the text from a large anti-HADOPI Sampsa stencil in the Butte aux Cailles neighborhood, but left the graphical artwork intact. Sampsa responded by repainting the political text.

La Quadrature du Net, a French digital rights advocacy group opposing HADOPI, has linked to Sampsa's Common Sense in Copyright Campaign.

===== Obsolescence is King =====
A Paris series titled Obsolescence is King depicts Steve Jobs as a clown king of obsolescence, attended to by 3rd world child laborers mining conflict minerals for use in gadgets, and a 1st world child praying for the latest iPhone model. In a 2013 interview, Sampsa said the series "is about defacing Jobs as an icon—to point out that his legend should be his role in designing planned obsolescence" into gadgets designed to be replaced often, driving child labor and environmental destruction in places such as Bangka Island. UNICEF featured an article about the campaign, and a large image of a Sampsa work satirizing Steve Jobs, in an online magazine about Child Labor.

===== Other Paris works =====
A Sept. 29th 2013 tweet from the feminist group Femen, reporting that the Russian president Vladimir Putin had been sighted in the rue Geoffroy-l'Angevin, was determined to be describing a new Sampsa piece. Putin also appears in “Little Brother Is Watching You,” one of Sampsa's street tiles.

==== Russia ====
For his works supporting the cause of Pussy Riot, Sampsa was invited to participate in an exhibition of contemporary activist street art in St. Petersburg. A Sampsa piece featuring Vladimir Putin as a dwarf with the text “Little Brother is watching you”, slated for display in the Museum of Modern Art and Design in Omsk, Siberia, was censored by the United Russia Party, by being removed from the museum walls. Where the piece would have been displayed, the message "It was Putin" appeared instead.

==== United States ====
A Sampsa piece depicting President Obama as a robot with devil horns appeared in Los Angeles, on La Brea. A Sampsa piece depicting a prisoner in ball and chains labelled with media company logos appeared in New Orleans. After initially being attributed to Banksy, it was recognized as a Sampsa, and protected by clear plastic.

==== Italy ====
Sampsa pieces promoting resistance to the high-speed rail line currently being constructed in the Italian Alps appeared in Palermo, Sicily.

==== Egypt ====
Sampsa began a collaboration with Egyptian street artist Ganzeer.

=== 2014 ===
==== Sisi War Crimes ====
Sampsa continued his collaboration with Egyptian street artist Ganzeer, creating pieces in Paris and Brooklyn, NY in protest against Egyptian presidential frontrunner Abdel Fattah el-Sisi. The pieces tie-in with recent works by street artists Ganzeer and Captain Borderline, and the painter Molly Crabapple, all of which incorporate the slogan "Sisi War Crimes". The Egyptian government classified the street artists 'terrorists' and associated them with the Muslim Brotherhood.

== Technique ==
Most of Sampsa's works have been stencils, however he has also become known for making 'removable street art' painted in-studio on canvases, tile, metal, and other media, and then mounted on the street. These works can then be removed and taken home without damaging the mounting surface. Regarding this technique, Sampsa has said:

"Artists who paint on churches and statues make it twice as difficult for the rest of us ... The aim is that the political agitation will continue, both on the streets and on the walls of homes. Judging from the signs, some of my works have been removed carefully and kept intact. I hope they found good homes."

== Street art and activism ==
Sampsa's work has been published in a scholarly work, Le street art au tournant by Prof. Christophe Genin, which argues that street art is now "at a crossroads between illegality and the collective imagination." Sampsa's work has become associated with political causes not directly affiliated with the artist. Occupy Monsanto published a Sampsa image on its homepage; within hours it hit 178 shares, with approx. 50,000 viewers. Tzortzis Rallis, one of the co-founders of The Occupied Times of London design team, studied 'Sampsa' for his residency in Finland. Journalists have used images of Sampsa's works in articles on HADOPI.
