= Pirkko Hämäläinen (diplomat) =

Finnish diplomat

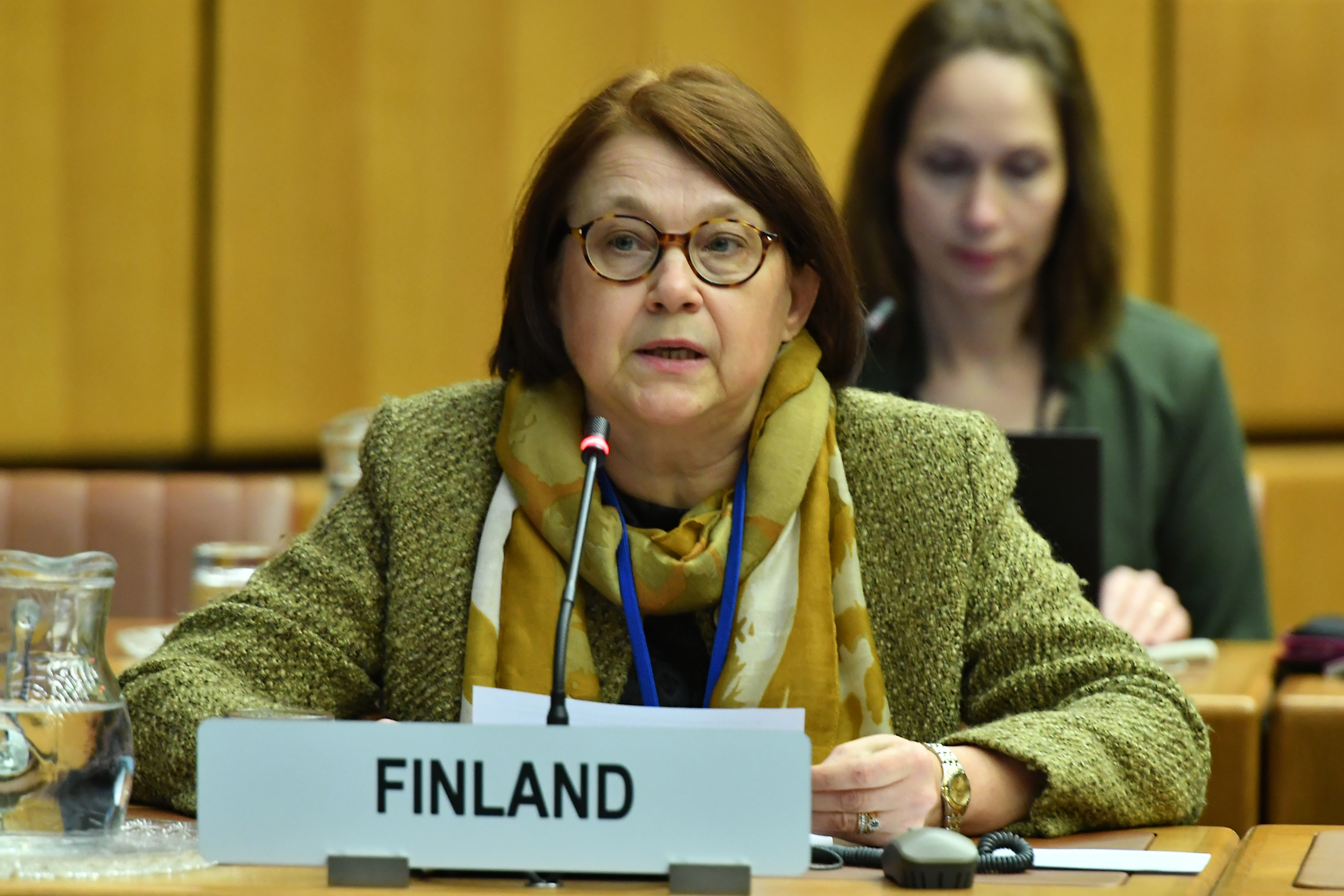
- Born: September 26, 1961 (age 64); Juankoski

Pirkko Mirjami Hämäläinen (born September 26, 1961) is a diplomat. She has been serving as Finnish ambassador to Turkey since 2023.

== Life ==
Hämäläinen was born in Juankoski in 1961. She completed her master's degree in 1988 and the following year she joined the Finnish diplomatic service. She was in New York at the United Nations in 1989. She then served in Reykjavik, Vienna, Tallinn (Estonia 2005–2009). In 2012 she was in Riga as she became her country's Ambassador to Latvia. She was there until 2014 when she became an under secretary of state. She was involved in 2014 when parliament was asked to amend the legislation that dealt with Finnish embassies. At the time a Finnish embassy with an ambassador had to deliver a range of services. It was proposed that it be changed so that an embassy could consist of just one person. She served in that role looking after "internal and external services" until the end of 2018.

On the first day of 2019 she became the Finnish Ambassador to Austria and the Permanent Representative of Finland to the International Organizations in Vienna including the United Nations. She replaced Hannu Kyröläinen. Pirkko Hämäläinen was appointed by the Finnish President Sauli Niinistö as Ambassador to the Finnish Embassy in Ankara as of 1 September 2023.

Diplomatic posts
Preceded by Ari Mäki	Ambassadors of Finland to Turkey; 2023–present	Incumbent
Preceded by Hannu Kyröläinen	Ambassadors of Finland to Austria; 2019–2023	Succeeded by Nina Vaskunlahti
