= Aili Nurminen =

Finnish meteorologist

Aili Linnea Nurminen
- Born: 16 July 1896; Pori, Finland
- Died: 27 November 1972 (aged 76); Barcelona, Spain
- Education: University of Helsinki
- Occupation: Aeronautical meteorologist

Aili Linnea Nurminen (16 July 1896, Pori – 27 November 1972, Barcelona) was a Finnish meteorologist who specialized in fog and cloud conditions and was a pioneer of the country's aviation meteorology efforts. She worked for the Finnish Meteorological Institute from 1926 to 1963.

== Life and work ==
Born into the family of Juho Frans Nurminen, a tailor from Pori, Finland, Aili Nurminen graduated from Pori Girls' High School in 1918 and then studied at the University of Helsinki, where she graduated with a Bachelor of Arts in 1927. Nurminen went on o complete her master's degree and worked at the Central Institute of Meteorology as an acting assistant until she was appointed in December 1936 to the post of aeronautical meteorologist at the special aeronautical weather station at Malmi Airport in Helsinki. The new aeronautical weather service was needed, among other things, for the more accurate weather forecasts required by the new night flight operations at Malmi Airport.

Nurminen took an active role in developing the fledgling field of Finnish aviation meteorology. On a study trip to Sweden and Germany in 1936, she learned lessons that were applied not only by the Finnish Meteorological Institute but also by the Finnish Air Force. New observation equipment was purchased for Malmi from Germany, and Nurminen learned to use it even though she was working in a world previously dominated by men.

In 1937, Parliament provided funding for the post of aeronautical meteorologist, and in 1938, Nurminen became Finland's first chief meteorologist. Thanks to Nurminen, teletypewriters were introduced at Finnish air weather stations as early as 1939 (the Post and Telegraph Company did not open its own teletypewriter service until after World War II in 1946).

During Finland's Winter War with the Soviet Union (1939-1940), Nurminen worked as a meteorologist at Vaasa Airport, and during the following Continuation War from 1941 to 1942, she worked at Pori Airport, where there was a large German base at the time. Nurminen was considered so skilled that, for example, she was contacted from Stockholm, Sweden, in bad weather to ask whether aircraft could be sent safely to Finland.

In 1950, she was described as having conducted "special studies in cloud and fog conditions" when she toured weather facilities in the United States for six months and conferred with fellow aeronautical meteorologists.

In 1955, Nurminen earned her PhD and became the "first woman in the world to obtain a doctorate in meteorology." She is also considered to be the country's first internationally acclaimed female researcher in technical sciences.

In 1959, she was elected Woman of the Year by the Finnish Business and Officials Association.

Nurminen died at the age of 76 while on holiday in Barcelona. In her honor, the Finnish Cultural Foundation created the Aili Nurminen Fund to support doctoral research by the country's women scientists in the fields of physics and meteorology.

== Selected publications ==
In addition to her doctoral thesis, Nurminen published more than 30 scientific papers.

- Nurminen, A. (1936). Sichtschätzung am Flughafen in Helsinki. Suomalaisen Tiedeakatemian Kustantama.
- Nurminen, A. (1950). A study of fog, with special reference to southern Finland. University of Helsinki. (dissertation)
- Nurminen, A. (1951). Wind Convergence as a Factor in Persistent Radiation Fog. Bulletin of the American Meteorological Society, 32(2), 72–73. JSTOR 26242282
- Nurminen, A. (1954). Precipitation of ice needles as a factor causing disappearance of fog. Geophysica, Helsinki, 4 (4): 226–230.
- Nurminen, A. (1956). Meteorological conditions at Helsinki airport in 1947-53.
- Nurminen, A. (1957). Variations in the Difference between the Dew Point of the Air and the Water Temperature before Sea Fog. Ilmatieteellinen keskuslaitos.
- Nurminen, A. (1957). Finnish Meteorological Office, Helsinki. Geophysica, 6, 36.
