= Kerttu Nurminen =

Finnish designer and glass artist

- Born: Kerttu Rantanen; 8 March 1943 (age 83); Lahti, Finland
- Education: Taideteollinen oppilaitos
- Known for: Glass art; industrial design in glass and ceramic

Kerttu Nurminen (née Rantanen; born 8 March 1943) is a Finnish industrial designer of glass and ceramics.

Nurminen studied ceramics at the School of Industrial Design (Taideteollinen oppilaitos) in Helsinki (now part of the Aalto University School of Arts, Design and Architecture), in 1966–1970; however, she prefers glass over ceramic as material. Among her teachers was Kaj Franck, who was attached to the Nuutajärvi glass works at the time.

Soon after graduating, Nurminen was recruited by Franck to join the design team at Nuutajärvi, where she remained for her entire 35-year-career, working alongside the likes of Franck and Oiva Toikka, eventually ending up alone as the company's last full-time salaried designer.

She has designed a wide range of products, from mass-produced tableware to unique artworks, especially in glass. Although many of her designs are widely known, some even 'household names', she herself always avoided publicity and is not a 'celebrity designer' unlike many of her contemporaries. Among her best-known designs is the Mondo range of glasses and carafs, which has been described as a "modern design classic". Her art pieces often draw inspiration from nature. Many of her designs employ complex design methods such as the 'graal' technique.

Nurminen has exhibited actively both home and abroad since the early 1970s. Her works are also included in the permanent collections of several museums, including the Design Museum of Finland, National Museum of Norway, the Victoria and Albert Museum of London, and New York's Museum of Modern Art.
