= Mika Peltonen =

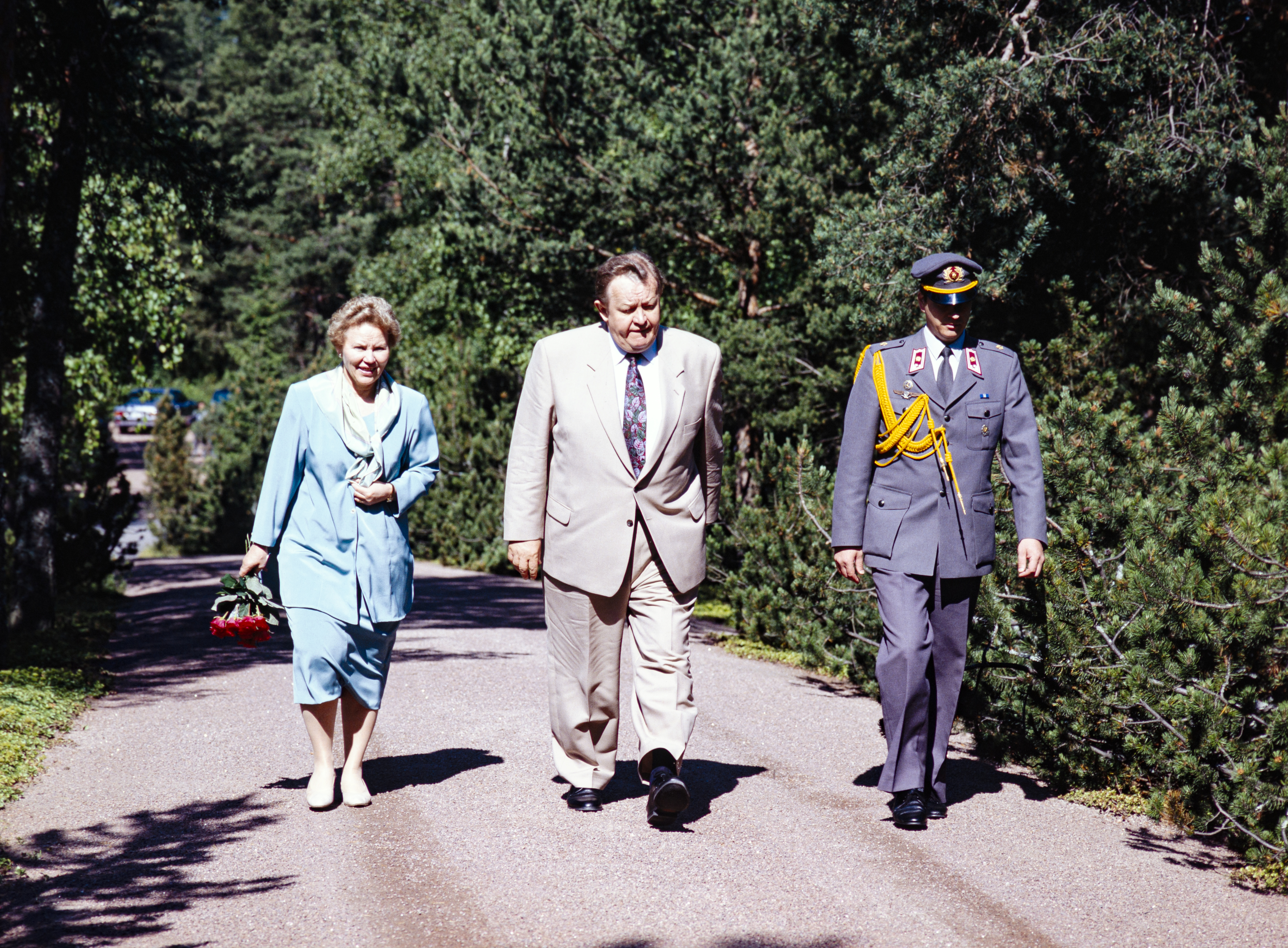
- Mika Peltonen (right) in 1994 as aide-de-camp for president Martti Ahtisaari
- Occupation: Lieutenant General

Lieutenant General Mika Peltonen was the Chief of Operations in the Finnish Defense Forces.

General Peltonen was born on 23 January 1956 in Tampere, Finland. He was a foreign exchange student taking part in the Youth For Understanding exchange program. He lived in Glendale, California where he attended and graduated from Herbert Hoover High School. He graduated from high school in Finland in 1976 and the Finnish Military Academy in 1980.

General Peltonen has had a career in the Finnish Military. He has served as Aide-de-Camp to three successive Finnish Presidents, taught at the Finnish Military Academy, been Commander of the Multinational Task Force North of EUFOR in 2005, had command of an infantry brigade, Inspector on Finnish Infantry, Finnish Defense forces Chief of Planning and is currently serving as Chief of Operations.
