= Vesa Kanniainen =

Finnish economist

Vesa Lennart Kanniainen (born March 13, 1948, in Rovaniemi) is a professor of economics at the University of Helsinki.

== Biography ==
Vesa Kanniainen studied at the London School of Economics from 1972 to 1973, working within macroeconomic theory and monetary economics, topics that he was also teaching as Visiting Assistant Professor at Brown University and Washington State University from 1977 to 1979. Most of his academic life, he has been working at the University of Helsinki. In research, he subsequently moved to dynamic investment models, including tax effects, and he started to teach corporate finance. Later, he has given some courses at Uppsala University, LMU Munich and at the University of Hamburg. He is a research fellow at CESifo in Munich.

== Academic work ==
His most highly cited paper:

Kanniainen, V., & Keuschnigg, C. (2003). The optimal portfolio of start-up firms in venture capital finance. Journal of Corporate Finance, 9(5), 521-534.

has been cited 325 times according to Google Scholar.

His second most cited paper:

Kanniainen, V., & Keuschnigg, C. (2004). Start-up investment with scarce venture capital support. Journal of Banking & Finance, 28(8), 1935-1959.

has been cited 255 times.

== Other works ==
He also writes and publishes short stories and poems:

- Vaaroja Vapautta Viettelyksiä, VK World 2004, Yliopistopaino ISBN 952-99428-0-X, Helsinki 2004.
- Jos voisin mä elämäni lauluksi laulaa. Nuoren miehen runoja ajalta, jolloin Suomi syntyi, poems by Juho Oskari Rautio (1885–1969), editing and preface Vesa Kanniainen, Yliopistopaino ISBN 952-91-3257-3, Helsinki 2001.
