= Kerttu Rytkönen =

Finnish architect (1895-1991)

- Born: 1 June 1895; Pielavesi
- Died: 22 April 1991 (aged 95); Helsinki
- Occupation: Architect
- Buildings: Salus hospital

Kerttu Rytkönen (1 June 1895, Pielavesi – 22 April 1991, Helsinki) was a Finnish architect and one of Finland's most famous female architects.

== Works ==
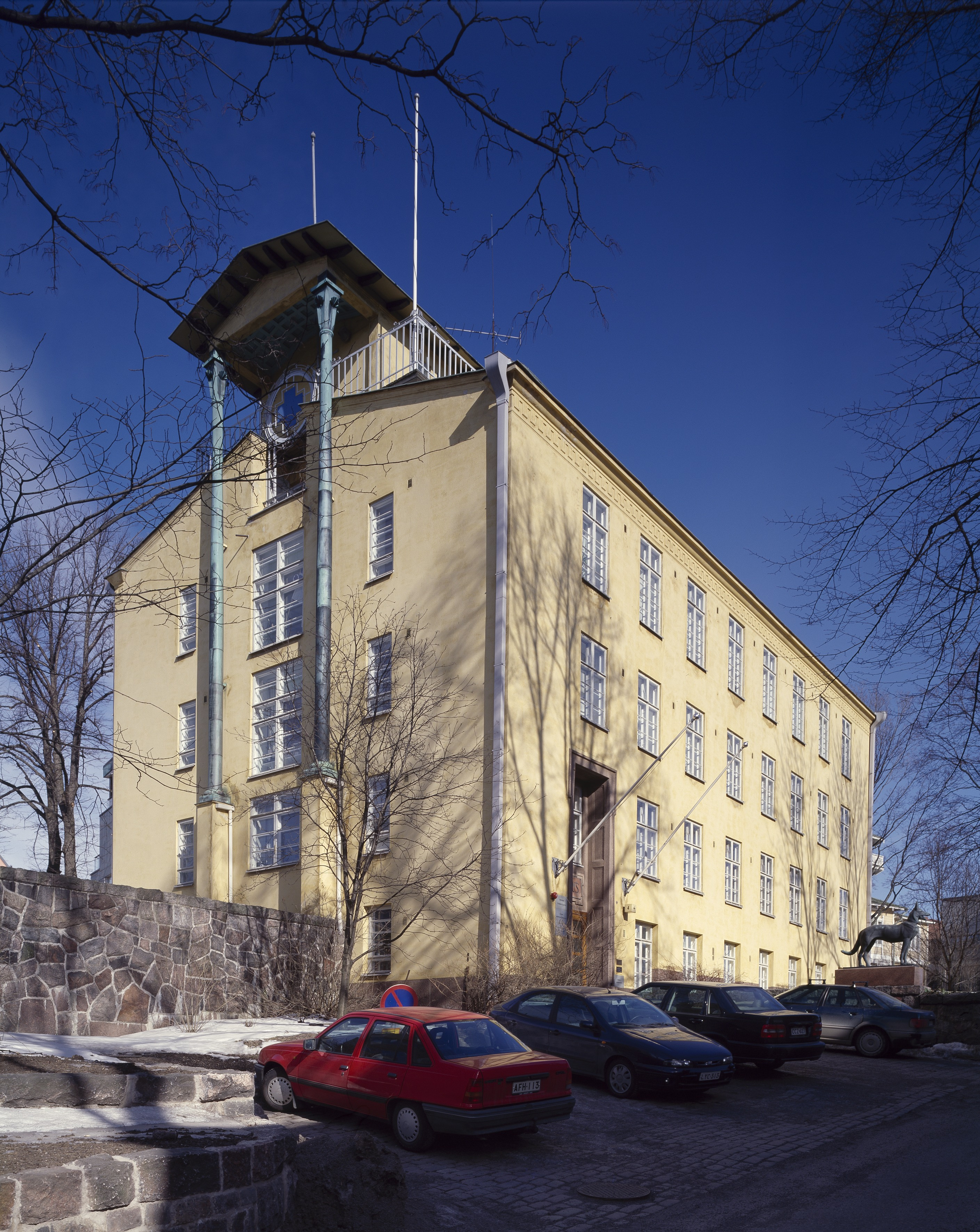
Salus hospital building in 2001.

Kerttu Rytkönen attended high school in Kuopio in 1914 and graduated as an architect in 1921. During her studies, she worked as a drafting person in the office of architect Eliel Saarinen.

Rytkönen's designed the Salus hospital at Kalliollinantie 4 in Helsinki's Kaivopuisto and it reflects Nordic classicism of the 1920s. This neoclassical building was finished in 1929. She designed the hospital at the request of her sisters, Ida and Maria Rytkönen who became the nurses and caretakers of the Salus hospital, which specialized in gynecological diseases, but also treated other patients.

In 1944, Ida and Maria donated the Salus building, and the operations within it, to the Wihuri Foundation. Hospital operations in the building continued until 1983, and after that the Wihuri Research Institute, which specialized in basic research into cardiovascular diseases, operated in the building until 2013. Over the next year, the building was completely renovated, and it houses the Jenny and Antti Wihuri Foundation and some other organizations such as the Finnish Sea Rescue Society and the Reijo Rautauoma Foundation.
