= Ihamuotila =

Ihamuotila is a Finnish surname. Notable people with this name include:

- Jaakko Ihamuotila (1939–2023), Finnish business executive
- Janne Ihamuotila (1868–1929), Finnish politician
- Risto Ihamuotila (born 1938), Finnish academic
- Veikko Ihamuotila (1911–1979), Finnish agricultural leader and government minister
