= Viikki Campus =

Campus area of the University of Helsinki, Finland

Coordinates: 60.226708°N 25.015215°E

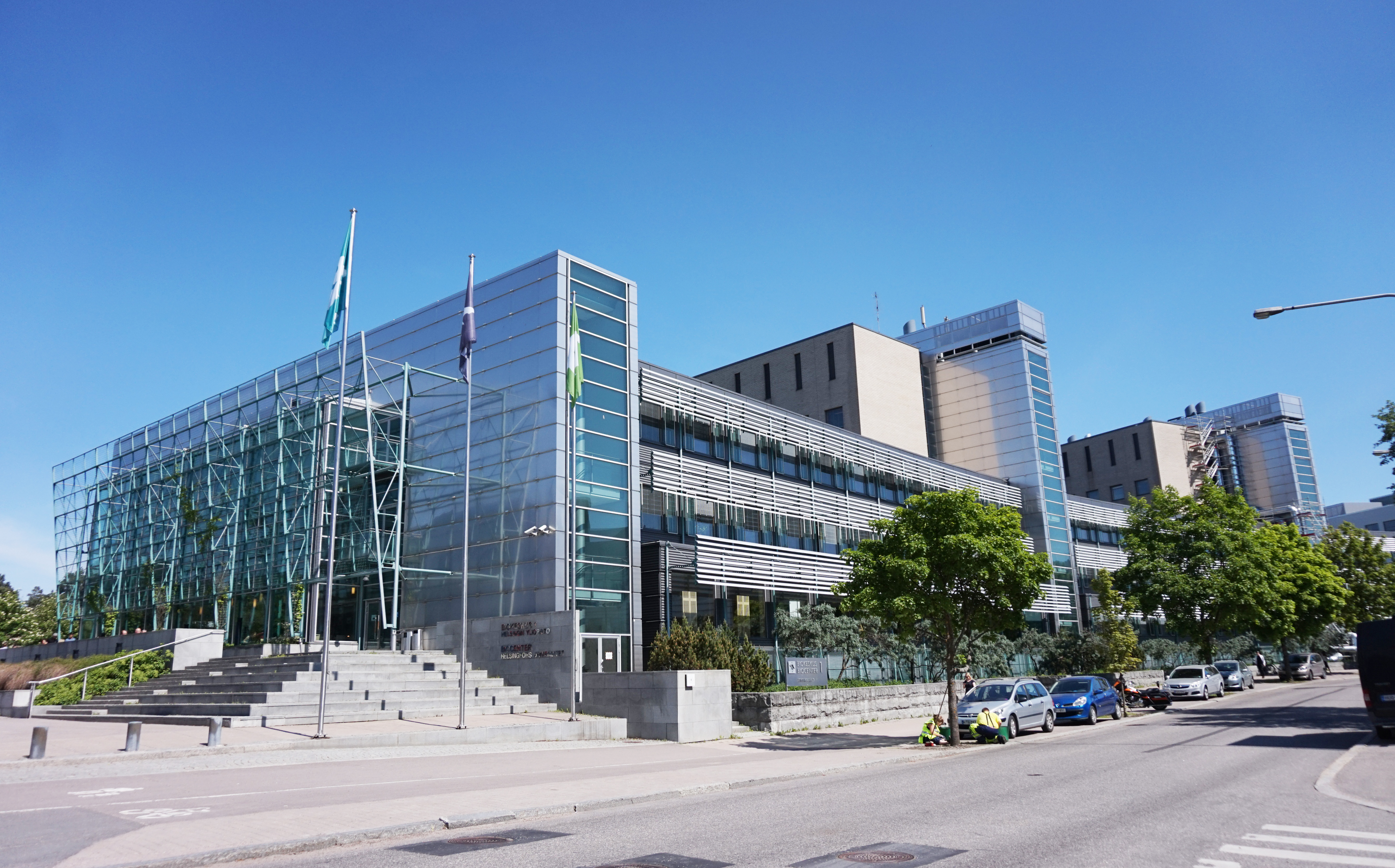
Part of the Biocenter complex

The Viikki Campus (Finnish: Viikin kampus, Swedish: Campus Vik) is a campus area of the University of Helsinki in Finland, focusing on biological sciences. It comprises following units:

- Faculty of Agriculture and Forestry
- Faculty of Biosciences
- Faculty of Pharmacy
- Faculty of Veterinary Medicine
- Institute of Biotechnology
- Viikki Science Library

Besides these units of the University of Helsinki, the campus area also hosts the Helsinki Science Park and the Finnish Food Safety Authority.

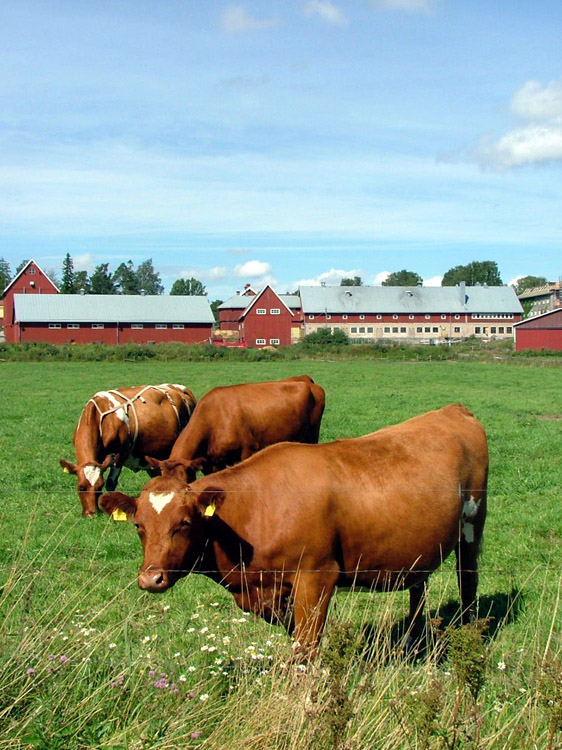
The Viikki Campus incorporates the Viikki teaching farm

The campus is located in the rapidly developing area of Viikki in Helsinki, about 10 km from the city center. It is closely associated with the Helsinki Business Park. The nearby arboretum, nature conservation area of Vanhankaupunginlahti and the experimental farm form a rare haven of countryside and wildlife at the heart of the capital city area.

At the center of the campus lies the Viikki Info Center, which is unique in Finland, as it hosts both the local municipal public library and a scientific library serving the Viikki Campus.

== History ==
Viikki area was a relatively wealthy agricultural village already in the Middle Ages. In conjunction of the founding of the City of Helsinki in 1555, the village of Viikki was formed as a crown storage manor (Swedish: ladugård) responsible for supplying the Vantaankoski Crown Manor, a local administrative center, with crops and fodder. While the crown manor at Vantaankoski was destroyed already in 1571 by Russians, the Viikki storage manor remained in state ownership. Subsequently it served a residence of different officers and the provincial governors.

The manor was allocated in 1931 to the University of Helsinki for use as an experimental and teaching farm. However, the University took the area in to its actual use only in 1946, after the Second World War. At this time, the area was clearly countryside outside the city. In 1960s, the Departments of Agriculture, Food Sciences, Domestic Sciences and Environmental Sciences received new buildings in the area, and student dormitories were also built for the students of the Faculty of Agriculture and Forestry.

The campus was built into its present size from the year 1993 onwards. Then, a decision was made to concentrate the Faculty of Agriculture and Forestry and all life sciences to the Viikki Campus, resulting in major construction activities. All departments of Forestry moved into the campus area in 2002, and the Departments, later Faculties of Biosciences and Pharmacy moved in Biocenter building complex at the same time. As part of the centralization of Helsinki bioscience activities, the Finnish Food Safety Authority moved into the area in 2006.

== See also ==
- City Centre Campus
- Kumpula Campus
- Meilahti Campus
- University of Helsinki
