= Riitta Jallinoja =

Finnish sociologist (born 1943)

- Born: Riitta Haantie; 1943 (age 82–83); Finland
- Occupation: sociologist
- Years active: 1984-present

Riitta Jallinoja (née Haantie; born 1943) is a Finnish sociologist, who was appointed Finland's first family sociology professor at the University of Helsinki in 2002. She is known, among other things, for studying the role of women, the family and modern life.

== Biography ==
Jallinoja completed her PhD in sociology at the University of Helsinki in 1983, with a dissertation entitled "Suomalaisen naisasialiikkeen taistelukaudet" (Finnish women's movement fighting seasons). Jallinoja has published several books on the subject of the changing dynamics of the family and participated in numerous international research projects in the field of family sociology.

Jallinoja has been acknowledged in the national scientific publication, as well as being presented with the JV Snellman and Elsa Enäjärvi-Haavio Awards. She is currently the Vice Dean of Faculty of Social Sciences.

Her husband is an architect Reijo Jallinoja.

Jallinoja elected to the Finnish Academy of Science and a member in 2001.

== Selected works ==
- Pasila, Helsinki. Asukastutkimus (in Finnish). Helsinki: Kaupunkisuunnitteluvirasto. Asemakaavaosasto. Ryhmä PA. 1969.
- Lasten päivähoitotutkimus: Suosituksia lasten päivähoidon järjestämiseksi ja selvitys siitä, mitä mahdollisuuksia opiskelijoilla on järjestää suositusten mukainen päivähoito (in Finnish). Helsinki: Suomen ylioppilaskuntien liitto. 1970.
- Tutkimus lasten päivähoidon kehityspiirteistä Suomessa (in Finnish). Helsinki: Helsingin yliopisto, sosiologian laitos. 1976.
- The Finnish woman: 60 years of Finnish independence. Helsinki: Ministry for Foreign Affairs Press Bureau. 1978.
- State intervention and privatization of family life. Helsinki: University of Helsinki. 1983.
- Suomalaisen naisasialiikkeen taistelukaudet: naisasialiike naisten elämäntilanteen muutoksen ja yhteiskunnallis-aatteellisen murroksen heijastajana (in Finnish). Porvoo: Söderström. 1983.
- Johdatus perhesosiologiaan (in Finnish). Helsinki: WSOY. 1985.
- Moderni elämä (in Finnish). Helsinki: SKS. 1991.
- Moderni säädyllisyys: aviosuhteen vapaudet ja sidokset (in Finnish). Helsinki: Gaudeamus. 1997.
- Opiskelijatutkimus: pilottitutkimus sosiologian opiskelijoiden opintojen esteistä (in Finnish). Helsinki: Helsingin yliopiston sosiologian laitos. 2000.
- Perheen vastaisku: familistista käännettä jäljittämässä (in Finnish). Helsinki: Gaudeamus. 2006.
- Families and kinship in contemporary Europe: rules and practices of relatedness. New York: Palgrave Macmillan. 2011.
