= Kettunen =

Kettunen is a Finnish surname, most prevalent in North Karelia. Notable people with the surname include:

- Kettunen, a finnicized name of the family Alopaeus
- Eino Kettunen (1894–1964), Finnish composer
- Lauri Kettunen (1885–1963), Finnish linguist
- Lauri Kettunen (1905–1941), Finnish fencer and modern pentathlete
- Pauli Kettunen (born 1953), Finnish historian
- Outi Kettunen (born 1978), Finnish biathlete
- Elina Kettunen (born 1981), Finnish figure skater
- Tuomas Kettunen (born 1988), Finnish politician
