= Nils Oker-Blom =

Finnish physician, professor and archiater

Arkkiatri Nils Oker-Blom
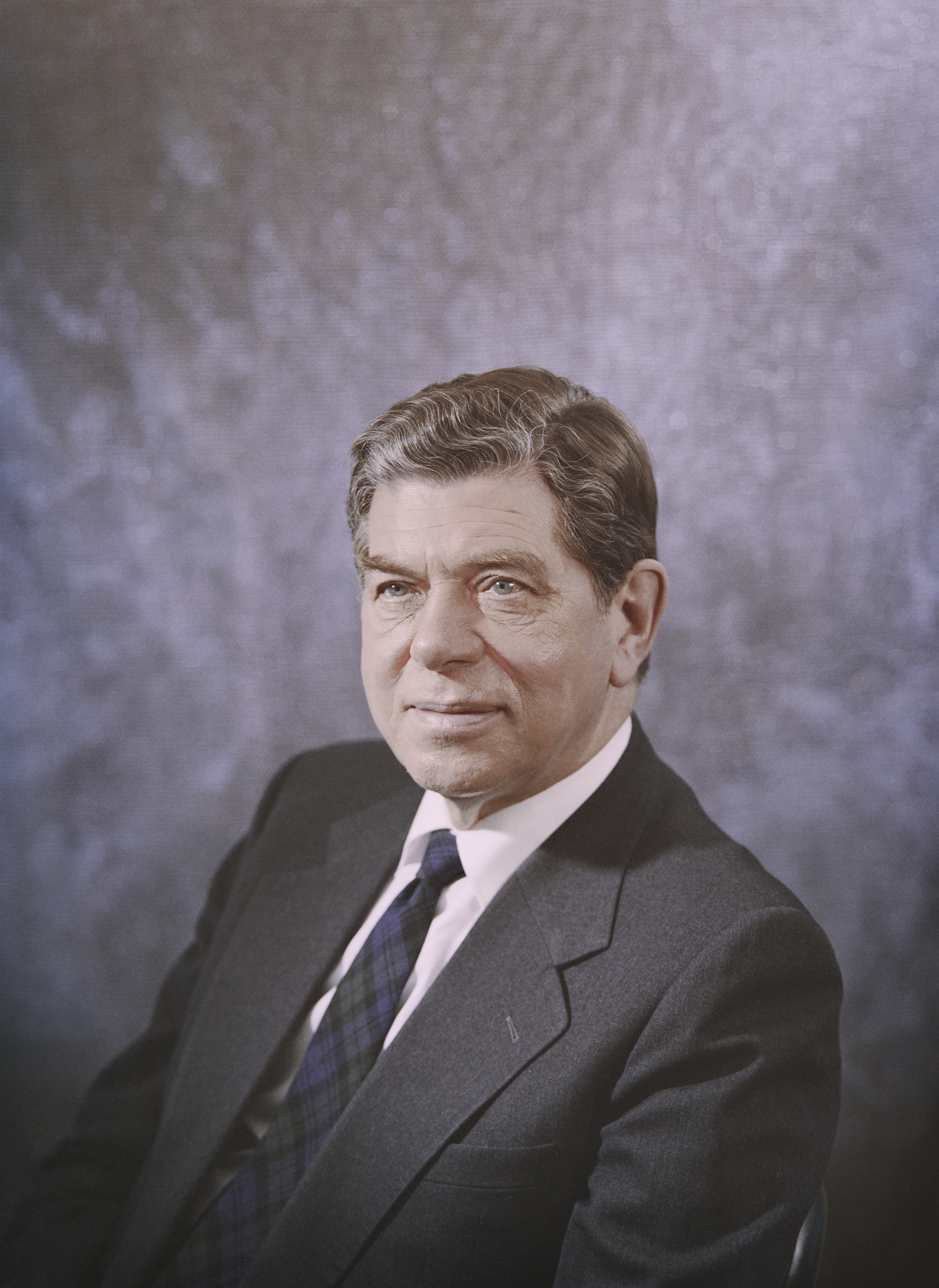
- Oker-Blom pictured in 1982
- Born: 5 August 1919; Helsinki, Finland
- Died: 16 January 1995 (aged 75); Helsinki
- Known for: Rector and Chancellor, University of Helsinki

Academic work
- Discipline: Physician
- Sub-discipline: Virologist

Nils Christian Edgar Oker-Blom (5 August 1919 – 16 January 1995) was a Finnish physician and virologist, who also served as the rector and, later, chancellor of the University of Helsinki.

Oker-Blom graduated from medical school in 1938, obtained a Licenciate of medicine degree in 1947, and Doctorate in 1948.

He began his career at the University of Helsinki in 1950 as an associate professor (Dosentti) of bacteriology and serology. In 1957, he was made a full professor of virology, as the first holder of such post in Finland, and is considered the father of Finnish virology.

Oker-Blom served as the Dean of the Faculty of Medicine in 1968–69, as the rector of the university in 1978–1983, and finally as its chancellor in 1983–88.

He is known for his research on arboviruses, especially tick-borne encephalitis.

In 1992, Oker-Blom was granted the title of Arkkiatri (Archiater), the highest honour given to a physician in Finland, which can only be held by one person at a time. He was also granted the honorary title of Akateemikko (Academician).

The Oker-Blom family has been ennobled since 1866.

In 1944, Oker-Blom married Constance Victorine née Nordenswan; the couple had three children.
