= Jaakko Ihamuotila =

Finnish business executive (1939–2023)

Vuorineuvos Jaakko Ihamuotila
- Born: 15 November 1939; Helsinki, Finland
- Died: 13 October 2023 (aged 83); Helsinki, Finland
- Occupation: Business executive
- Known for: CEO of Valmet; President and Chairman of Neste
- Spouse: Tuula née Turja
- Children: 3
- Parents: Veikko Ihamuotila (father); Anna-Liisa Kouki (mother)
- Relatives: Risto Ihamuotila (brother)

Jaakko Ihamuotila (15 November 1939 – 13 October 2023) was a Finnish business executive known for his senior roles in some of Finland's largest corporations, including as the CEO of Valmet and long-serving President and Chairman of Neste. He has been described as one of the most influential business leaders of his time in Finland.

== Early life and education ==
Jaakko Ihamuotila was born as the second of four children to Veikko Ihamuotila, an agriculture sector influencer and ex-Minister of Agriculture and Forestry, and his wife Anna-Liisa.

Ihamuotila studied engineering at the Helsinki University of Technology, graduating in 1964 with a Diplomi-insinööri (MSc in Technology) degree in physics. He has said he was inspired already as a teenager to go into technology, by the opening of the world's first full-scale nuclear power plant for electricity generation, Calder Hall (now part of Sellafield), in the UK in 1956.

== Career ==
Ihamuotila's early career included research and engineering positions at Canadian General Electric in Toronto, Imatran Voima and the Helsinki University of Technology. He then moved to Valmet, and its various group companies, where he held a series of management roles, including a seat on the group's main Board of Directors from 1973.

In 1973, Ihamuotila was appointed CEO of Valmet, in which role he served until 1979. In 1979 he was appointed to the Board of Neste, the national oil company of Finland, and from 1980 onwards he served there also in an executive role as the company's president and Chairman, until 2000. During his tenure, Neste was ranked on the Fortune Global 500 list. After Neste and Imatran Voima merged to form Fortum, Ihamuotila continued to serve for a while in a non-executive Board role. In the early 2000s, Ihamuotila was among the founders, and one-time chairman, of the Millennium Technology Prize.

== Honours ==
In 1990, Ihamuotila was awarded the highest civilian honorary title of Vuorineuvos by President Mauno Koivisto. Ihamuotila was also conferred several honorary doctorates, including by his alma mater, the Helsinki University of Technology (now Aalto University).

== Personal life and death ==
Ihamuotila was married to Tuula (née Turja; daughter of Ilmari Turja), and they had three children.

His older brother, Professor Risto Ihamuotila, is an academic who served for many years as the Chancellor of the University of Helsinki.

Jaakko Ihamuotila died on 13 October 2023, at the age of 83.
