= Lauri Carlson =

Finnish linguist (born 1952)

- Born: 1952 (age 73–74)
- Education: Massachusetts Institute of Technology (PhD, 1982)
- Occupation: Linguist
- Employer: University of Helsinki

Lauri Henrik Carlson (born 1952) is a Finnish linguist and professor at the University of Helsinki. He is known for work in discourse and dialogue modelling, formal semantics, machine translation (especially controlled-language MT), multilingual terminology, and the semantic web. He is the author of the widely cited monograph Dialogue Games: An Approach to Discourse Analysis and a contributor to computational grammar formalisms such as Regular Unification Grammar (RUG).

A Festschrift published for his 60th birthday in 2012 (Shall We Play the Festschrift Game?) documents his influence across translation studies, terminology, and language technology; the volume also notes his instrumental role in creating the initial version of the Finnish WordNet.

== Education ==
Carlson earned his PhD in linguistics at the MIT in 1982. His dissertation, Dialogue Games: An Approach to Discourse Analysis, laid the foundation for his later book of the same name.

== Career and research ==
At the University of Helsinki, Carlson has taught and supervised in linguistics and translation and has been affiliated with projects in language technology and terminology. His university profile lists research and teaching in formal semantics of natural language, dialogue modelling, controlled-language machine translation, multilingual terminology and the semantic web.

In computational linguistics, Carlson proposed Regular Unification Grammar (RUG) and presented it at COLING 1988. He also co-authored work on graph-unification approaches to machine translation, including the COLING 1990 paper Independent Transfer Using Graph Unification (with Maria Vilkuna).

Carlson has led and participated in several terminology and translation-technology initiatives. He and collaborators developed the TermFactory platform for collaborative, ontology-based terminology work in projects funded by Tekes and others. He has been active around the Helsinki Term Bank (Tieteen termipankki), for example presenting with colleagues on federating terminological and ontological resources.

Carlson's University of Helsinki project record also includes leadership or roles in translation-technology projects such as MOLTO – Multilingual On-Line Translation (2010–2014) and Translation Studies and Terminology (TraST) (2013–2016).

== Selected works ==
Books

- Carlson, Lauri. Dialogue Games: An Approach to Discourse Analysis. Dordrecht: D. Reidel, 1983; reprint, Springer, 2012.

Articles and chapters

- Carlson, Lauri. "Aspect and Quantification." In Tense and Aspect (Syntax and Semantics, vol. 14), ed. Philip J. Tedeschi & Annie Zaenen, 31–64. New York: Academic Press, 1981.
- Carlson, Lauri. "RUG: Regular Unification Grammar." In Proceedings of COLING 1988. ACL, 1988.
- Carlson, Lauri & Maria Vilkuna. "Independent Transfer Using Graph Unification." In COLING 1990, Volume 3. ACL, 1990.
- Niemi, Jyrki & Carlson, Lauri. "Towards modeling the semantics of calendar expressions as extended regular expressions." In Proceedings of NODALIDA 2005, 2006.

== Recognition ==
- Shall We Play the Festschrift Game? Essays on the Occasion of Lauri Carlson's 60th Birthday (Springer, 2012). The volume records his contributions to Finnish language technology and terminology; one chapter notes he was "instrumental" in creating the initial Finnish WordNet.

== See also ==
- Computational linguistics
- Terminology
- Machine translation
- WordNet
