= Meilahti Campus =

Coordinates: 60°11′25″N 24°54′25″E

The Meilahti Campus (Finnish: Meilahden kampus, Swedish: Campus Mejlans) is a campus area of the University of Helsinki in Finland. It is home to the University's Faculty of Medicine, and the Helsinki Institute of Life Science (HiLIFE). The HiLIFE instiutie was established in 2017.

== See also ==
- City Centre Campus
- Kumpula Campus
- University of Helsinki
- Viikki Campus
