= City Centre Campus =

Coordinates: 60.170347°N 24.950498°E

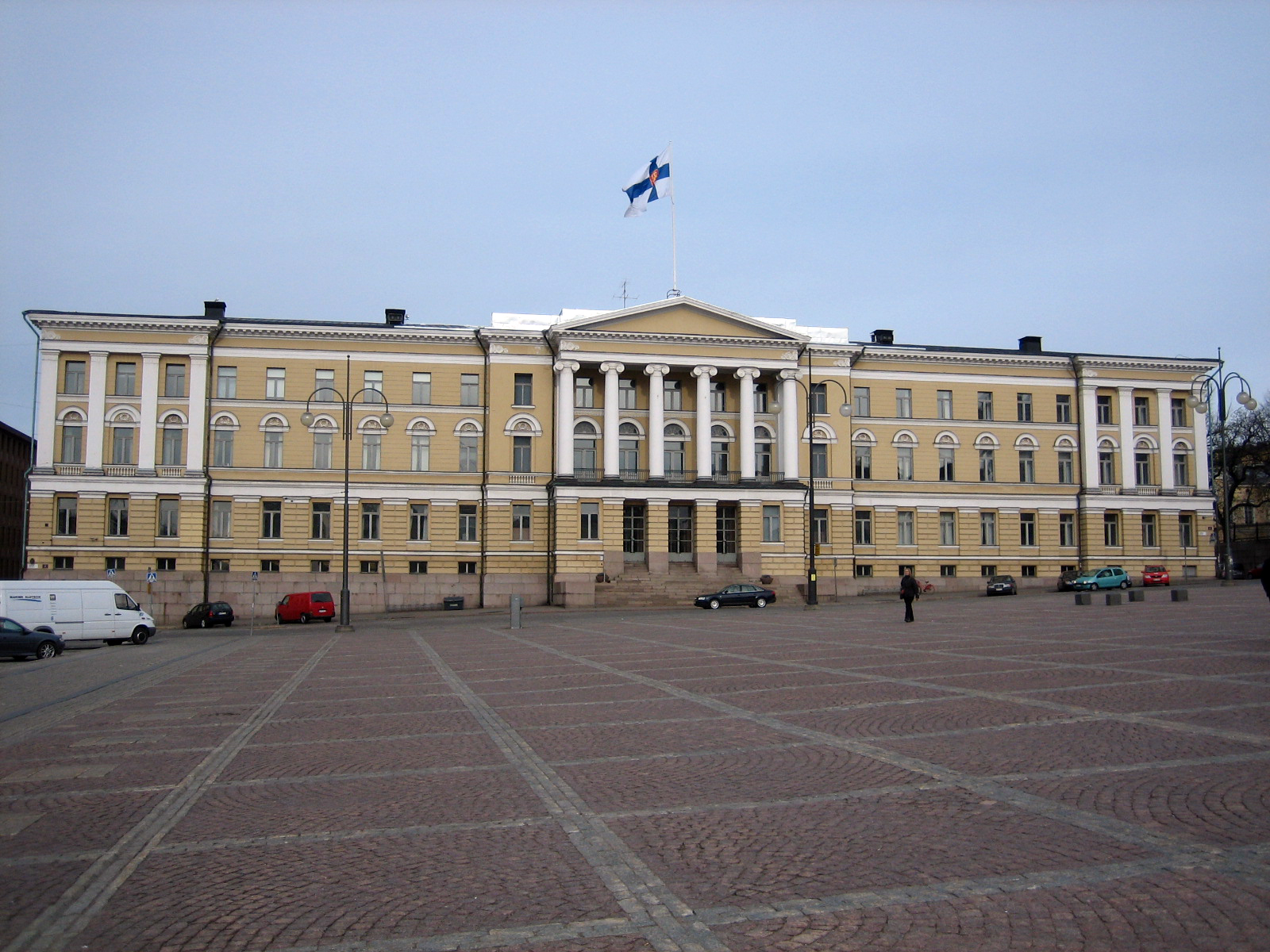
Main building of the University of Helsinki, part of the city centre campus.

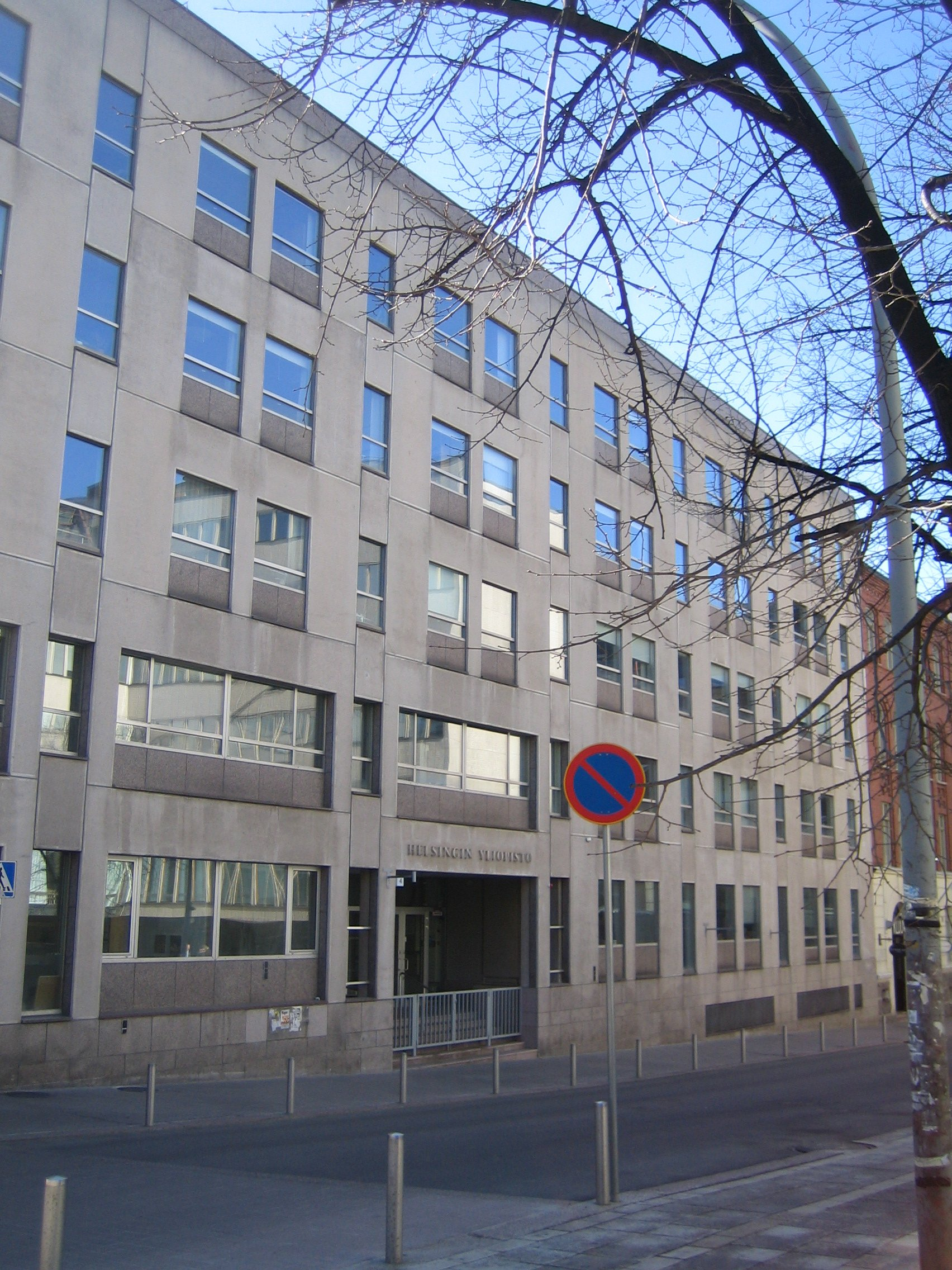
Administration building.

The City Centre Campus (Finnish: Keskustakampus, Swedish: Centrumcampus) is one of the four campus areas of the University of Helsinki. It is located at the historic centre of Helsinki. The campus houses the following faculties:

- Faculty of Arts
- Faculty of Behavioural Sciences
- Faculty of Law
- Faculty of Social Sciences
- Faculty of Theology

In addition, the university central administration and several independent research institutes.

== See also ==
- Kumpula Campus
- Meilahti Campus
- University of Helsinki
- Viikki Campus
