= Laura Harmaja =

Finnish economist (1881–1954)

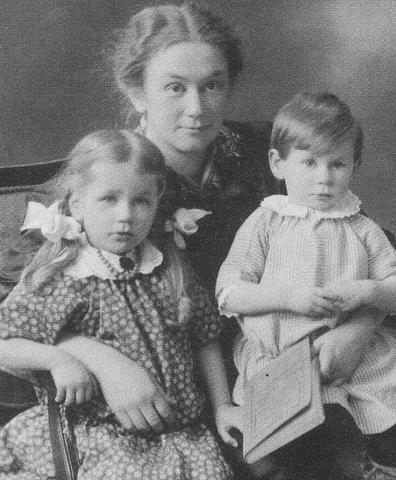
- Harmaja with her two children
- Born: Laura Maria Genetz; September 16, 1881; Hämeenlinna, Finland
- Died: January 18, 1954 (aged 72); Helsinki, Finland
- Occupations: Economist, writer
- Spouse: Leo Harmaja

Laura Maria Harmaja (née Genetz; September 16, 1881 – January 18, 1954) was a Finnish economist. Harmaja wrote books published in Finland as well as in Germany and the United States.

== Biography ==
Harmaja studied at the University of Helsinki, graduating with a bachelor's degree in 1905 and a master's degree in 1907.

Harmaja worked as a teacher at the Finnish Business School 1913–1916 and 1920–1923, the Helsinki School of Merchant Commerce 1915–1918, the Finnish Postgraduate School 1914–1923 and the Helsinki School of Economics (later the Home Economics Teacher School) 1915–1951. Harmaja taught at the University of Helsinki's as a professor of home economics from 1947 to 1950.

Harmaja was a member of the editorial board of Kotiliesi magazine from 1922 to 1954, vice-president of the Finnish National Association of Women and the Finnish Women's Association, and chair of the board of the Finnish School of Education and the Finnish Household Center.
