= Liisa Ahtee =

Finnish pharmacologist

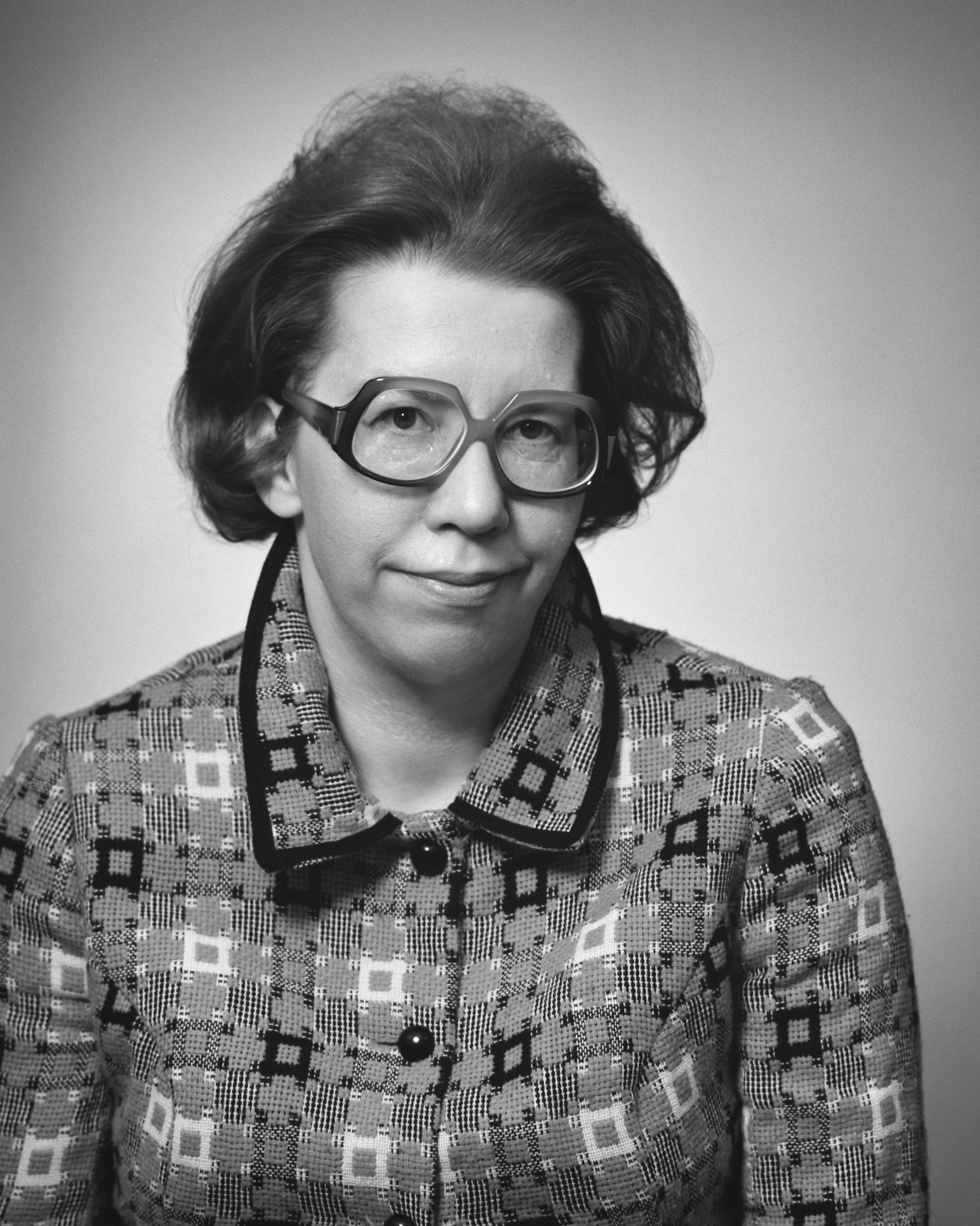
- Ahtee in 1975
- Born: 2 October 1937; Turku, Finland
- Occupations: pharmacologist, professor
- Years active: 1975–present

Liisa Marjatta Ahtee (born 2 October 1937) is a Finnish pharmacologist and professor emeritus. She served as pharmacology and biological medicine standardization chair at the University of Helsinki from 1975 to 2002.

== Biography ==
Ahtee was born on 2 October 1937 in Turku to Aaro Veli Vilho and Lyyli Iida Kyllikki Ahtee. Ahtee graduated as a medical doctor in 1962 and defended her Ph.D. in Pharmacology at the University of Helsinki in 1967. From 1967 to 1969 she conducted scientific research at the American Red Cross Institute of Animal Physiology of Cambridge and from 1970–1971 at the Royal College of Surgeons in London before returning to Finland. In 1975 Ahtee was appointed as a professor and chair at the University of Helsinki in pharmacology and biological medical standardization divisions. In 1977 she conducted research at the University of Gothenburg in Sweden and in Paris in 1980.

Ahtee's research specialization is neuropharmacology, concentrating on the effects of drugs and drug addiction on the central nervous system neurotransmitters. She has written hundreds of articles on her research findings and is considered an international expert. In addition to writing, Ahtee has been the editor of several international science journals, including Naunyn-Schmiedeberg's Archives of Pharmacology.

In 1999, she was the Albert Wuokko Award recipient, an annual prize given to distinguished pharmaceutical scientists of Finland and in 2003, she was awarded an honorary doctorate from Tartu University.

Even after her retirement as a professor, Ahtee continued her research completing a three-year project in 2010 on the "brain opioidergic systems and neurobehavioral sensitization in addiction to alcohol".
