= Veikko Ihamuotila =

Finnish politician (1911–1979)

Ministeri Veikko Ihamuotila
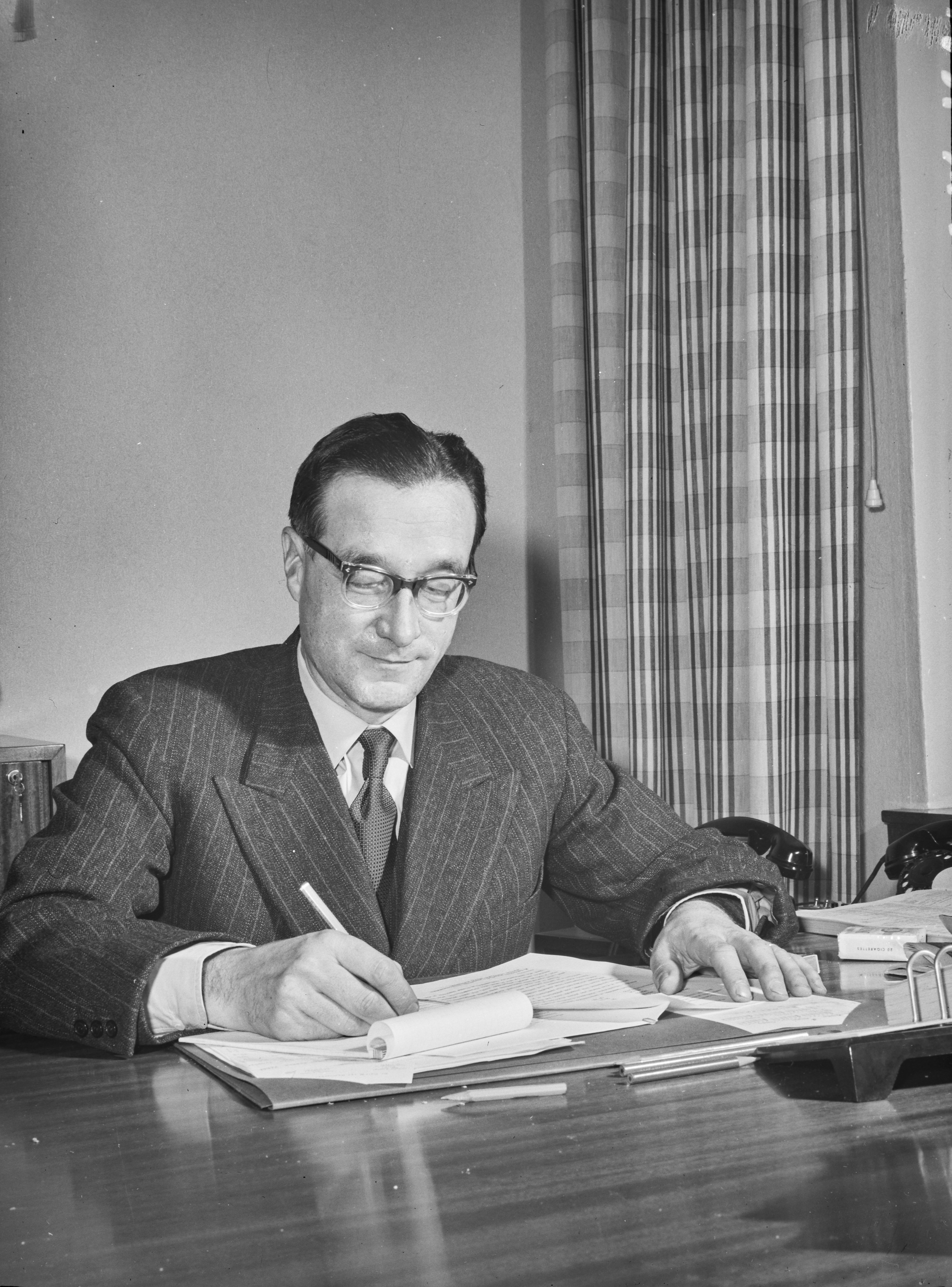
- Ihamuotila in 1955
- Born: 17 February 1911; Helsinki, Grand Duchy of Finland
- Died: 2 February 1979 (aged 67); Helsinki, Finland
- Occupation: Agronomist

Veikko Ihamuotila (17 February 1911 — 2 February 1979) was an influential Finnish agriculture sector leader, administrator and one-time government minister.

== Early life and education ==
Veikko Ihamuotila was born as the only child of Artturi and Hilda (née Kantala) Ihamuotila, owners of the Hista manor house in Espoo. His father died young, and in 1932, at the age of only 21, Veikko Ihamuotila took over the running of the manor and its associated farm.

He studied agronomy, graduating with a degree in Agriculture and Forestry and qualifying as Agronomi in 1935.

== Career ==
After a brief spell in the academia, Ihamuotila worked for many years as a manager and board member in the civil engineering and agricultural construction company Pellonraivaus Oy and its successors, which over time merged with several other engineering businesses eventually to form today's YIT corporation.

In 1947, Ihamuotila was appointed to the board of the Finnish Central Union of Agricultural Producers and Forest Owners (Maa- ja metsätaloustuottajain Keskusliitto, commonly known by its Finnish initialism 'MTK'), which he later chaired for over twenty years from 1954 to 1975. During his tenure, MTK gained influence and became a major force in Finnish politics and economic and regional policy-making.

Ihamuotila also held leadership positions at several agricultural and forestry companies and other organisations.

In the late 1960s he served as a board member and vice chairman of the International Federation of Agricultural Producers.

In 1975, Ihamuotila was appointed the Minister of Agriculture and Forestry in the Liinamaa caretaker government, a position he held for approximately six months.

== Honours ==
In 1976, Ihamuotila was granted the honorary title of Ministeri by President Urho Kekkonen.

In 1977, he was conferred an Honorary Doctorate in Agriculture and Forestry.

== Family ==
Ihamuotila had four children. The eldest, Risto (b. 1938), is an academic who eventually became the Chancellor of the University of Helsinki. Another son, Jaakko (b. 1939), went into corporate life, serving for many years as the CEO of Valmet and Neste.
