= Risto Ihamuotila =

Finnish academic

- Born: 15 May 1938 (age 88); Helsinki, Finland
- Parent(s): Veikko Ihamuotila (father), Anna Liisa née Kouki (mother)
- Relatives: Jaakko Ihamuotila (brother)

Academic background
- Education: University of Helsinki
- Thesis: Viljelijöiden työtulojen taso kirjanpitotiloilla 1956-1965 (1968)

Academic work
- Discipline: Natural sciences
- Sub-discipline: Agriculture and forestry
- Institutions: University of Helsinki, Cornell University
- Main interests: Agricultural economics

Risto Ihamuotila (born 15 May 1938) is a retired Finnish academic and ex-Chancellor of the University of Helsinki.

== Early life and education ==
Risto Veikko Artturi Ihamuotila was born as the first of four children to Veikko and Anna Liisa (née Kouki) Ihamuotila. His younger brother is the business executive, Vuorineuvos Jaakko Ihamuotila.

Risto Ihamuotila studied agriculture and forestry at the University of Helsinki, gaining his first degree in 1962, followed by Licentiate in 1965 and Doctorate in 1968. His 1968 doctoral thesis was on the subject of income levels of Finnish farmers in the 1950-1960s.

== Career ==
Ihamuotila held various research positions in agriculture and forestry at the University of Helsinki in the 1960s and early 1970s. He also served as assistant professor at Cornell University in 1969–1970.

In 1973, Ihamuotila was appointed Professor of agricultural policy at the University of Helsinki; aged 34, he was at the time the youngest full professor of the university. Afterwards he held several advisory and board positions in Finnish and Nordic academic and agricultural research organisations.

Ihamuotila served as the Dean of the faculty of agriculture and forestry from 1979, and as the Rector of the university in 1992–1996, before being promoted to the Chancellor of the University of Helsinki in 1996, which position he held until his retirement in 2003.

His legacy as the head of the university includes the establishment of the Biomedicum Helsinki research centre and Viikin tiedepuisto science park, among others.

He was also a member of the Council of the United Nations University from 1995 to 2001.

== Personal life ==
Risto Ihamuotila is married to the textile designer Kristiina née Malmivuo; they have three children, including Mika Ihamuotila, the ex-owner of Marimekko. They have farmed the family's Hista manor house in Espoo since the 1960s.

His main personal interest is botany: he has collected, photographed and catalogued over 1,000 plants, and written two guide books on Finnish flora. He is also a keen amateur weather observer, with journals recording weather details going back 50 years.
