= Pauli Kettunen =

Finnish historian

Pauli Tapio Kettunen (born 1953) is a professor of Political History in the Social Science Faculty of University of Helsinki. He has mainly written on the history of the Cold War, Nordic welfare societies, labour movements, conceptual history, and globalisation. Professor Kettunen was a board member of the Finnish Literature Society, the Finnish Historical Society (chair 2001–2008), and is currently the editor of the series Studia Fennica Historica.

== Selected works ==
=== Monographs ===
- 1994 – Suojelu, suoritus, subjekti: Työsuojelu teollistuvan Suomen yhteiskunnallisissa ajattelu- ja toimintatavoissa [Protection, Performance, and Subject: Labour Protection and the Social Modes of Thought and Action in Finland, c. 1880-1950]. Historiallisia Tutkimuksia 189. Suomen Historiallinen Seura, Helsinki.
- 1997 – Työjärjestys. Tutkielmia työn ja tiedon poliittisesta historiasta [The order of work. Studies in the political history of work and knowledge]. Tutkijaliitto, Helsinki.
- 2001 – Kansallinen työ: Suomalaisen suorituskyvyn vaalimisesta [National work. Studies on efforts for Finnish performance capacity]. Yliopistopaino, Helsinki.
- 2002 – Från arbetarfrågan till personalpolitik [From labour question to human resource management]. In Antti Kuusterä (ed.), Ett storföretag och dess omvandling. Parteks hundraåriga historia. Partek Oyj Abp, Helsinki. pp 265–384.
- 2008 – Globalisaatio ja kansallinen me. Kansallisen katseen historiallinen kritiikki [Globalisation and the national "we". A historical critique of national gaze]. Vastapaino, Tampere.

=== Edited books ===
- Kettunen, P; Eskola, H. (eds.). Models, Modernity and the Myrdals. Renvall Institute Publications 8. (University of Helsinki 1997).
- Kettunen, P; et al. (eds). Global Redefining of Working Life - A New Nordic Agenda for Competence and Participation? Nord, 12, Nordic Council of Ministers (Copenhagen 1998)
- Aunesluoma, J; Kettunen, P. (eds). The Cold War and the Politics of History. (Edita, Helsinki 2008).

=== Articles ===
- Kettunen, P. Le modèle nordique et le consensus sur la compétitivité en Finlande (2006), Revue internationale de politique comparée, 13:3. pp. 447–467.
- Kettunen, P. Corporate citizenship and social partnership. In Landgrén, L-F;Hautamäki, P. (eds). People, Citizen, Nation. (Renvall Institute, Helsinki 2005). pp 28–49.
- Kettunen, P. The Nordic Welfare State in Finland(2001), Scandinavian Journal of History, 26:3. pp 225–247.
- Kettunen, P. Yhteiskunta - Society in Finnish (2000), Finnish Yearbook of Political Thought, 4. pp 159–197.
- Kettunen, P. A Return to the Figure of the Free Nordic Peasant(1999), Acta Sociologica, 42:3. pp 259–269.
- Kettunen, P. The Society of Virtuous Circles (1997). In Kettunen, P; Eskola, H. (eds). Models, Modernity and the Myrdals. (See Above).
- Kettunen, P;Turunen, I. The Middle Class, Knowledge and the Idea of the Third Factor (1994), Scandinavian Journal of History, 1, pp 63–86.
