= Elsa Enäjärvi-Haavio =

Finnish folklorist

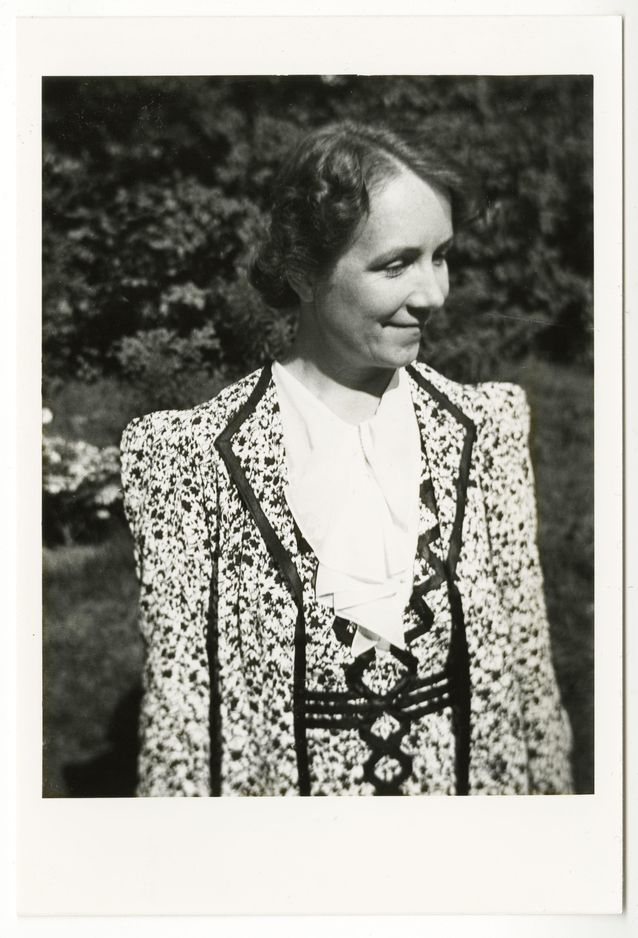
Elsa Enäjärvi-Haavio

Elsa Elina Enäjärvi-Haavio, also Elsa Eklund, (1901–1951) was a Finnish folklorist who carried out extensive research into folk poetry in the 1930s. As a result, in 1947 she was appointed docent of Finnish and folk poetics at the University of Helsinki. She was an influential member of many organizations, including the Finnish Federation of University Women, for which she represented Finland at the 30th anniversary of the International Federation of University Women in Switzerland.

== Biography ==
Born on 14 October 1901 in Vihti, Elsa Elina Eklund was the daughter of the farmer Kustaa Edvard Eklund and his wife Elin Vilhelmina née Andberg. She was the eldest of six children. When she was six, she moved with her family to Helsinki, where they opened a dairy shop. After completing her school education in 1919, she became a student of Finnish and Scandinavian history at the University of Helsinki, one of the first in independent Finland. Her fellow student Martti Haavio fell in love with her, as evidenced in the poems he wrote about her in his album Nuoret runoilijat (Young poets, 1924) and later works. They married in 1929 and had five children together.

From 1921, Elsa (who changed her name to Enäjärvi in 1922) published literary reviews in magazines and newspapers. After graduating in 1923, she wrote some 300 articles, including pieces on folklore and the history of literature. Making numerous trips to Estonia and Sweden, she researched and collected folk poetry and folk stories, publishing her findings in articles translated into Swedish, German, French, Estonian and English. In 1932, she became the first Finnish woman to earn a doctorate with a dissertation on The Game of Rich and Poor, based on findings during a trip to London where she studied collections of folk games at the British Museum. Her husband earned his doctorate the same year.

Enäjärvi-Haavio continued her research into folk poetry in the 1930s, becoming the first woman to be elected a deputy member the prestigious Kalevala Society in 1932 and a working member in 1947. The University of Helsinki appointed her as a docent in 1947 while her husband was appointed a full professor in 1949. She was active in many organizations, including the Finnish Federation of University Women and the Finnish Cultural Foundation. She sat on the city council of Helsinki, representing the National Coalition Party.

Elsa Enäjärvi-Haavio died of cancer in Helsinki on 24 January 1951, aged 49.
