= Finnish Food Safety Authority =

Finnish government agency

- Elintarviketurvallisuusvirasto, Livsmedelssäkerhetsverket

Agency overview
- Formed: 2006
- Jurisdiction: Finland
- Headquarters: Mustialankatu 3, Viikki, Helsinki
- Employees: 650
- Agency executive: Matti Aho, Director general
- Parent department: Ministry of Agriculture and Forestry
- Website: www.evira.fi

Finnish Food Safety Authority (Evira, Finnish: Elintarviketurvallisuusvirasto, Swedish Livsmedelssäkerhetsverket) is a centralised body operating under the Ministry of Agriculture and Forestry in Finland. Its statutory purpose is to ensure food safety, promote animal health and welfare, and develop the prerequisites for plant and animal production, and plant health.

The authority was founded in 2006, and its first director general was Jaana Husu-Kallio. Since 2012, the director general is Matti Aho. After staff reductions in 2015, the authority has roughly 650 employees.

The main office is in Viikki, Helsinki, but the authority has also regional offices in Joensuu, Kuopio, Lappeenranta, Loimaa, Oulu, Seinäjoki and Turku.
