= University of Helsinki =

University in Helsinki, Finland

Coordinates: 60°10′10″N 24°56′55″E

- Helsingin yliopisto Helsingfors universitet
- Coat of arms of the University of Helsinki
- Latin: Regia Academia Aboensis
- Former names: Royal Academy of Turku; Imperial Alexander University in Finland
- Motto: Finnish: Tieteen voimalla – maailman parhaaksi
- Motto in English: With the power of knowledge – for the world Helsingfors universitet
- Type: Public
- Established: 26 March 1640; 386 years ago
- Founder: Queen Christina of Sweden
- Affiliations: Europaeum; LERU; UArctic; Una Europa; Unica; Utrecht Network
- Endowment: € c. 2 billion
- Chancellor: Kaarle Hämeri
- Rector: Sari Lindblom
- Academic staff: 5,200 (2024)
- Administrative staff: 3,596
- Total staff: 8,796 (2024)
- Students: 31,871 (total, 2024)
- Undergraduates: 15,619 (2024)
- Postgraduates: 11,143 (2024)
- Doctoral students: 5,079 (2024)
- Location: Helsinki, Finland
- Campus: Urban area
- Language: Finnish, Swedish
- Website: www.helsinki.fi/en
- Location of the University of Helsinki in Finland

The University of Helsinki (Finnish: Helsingin yliopisto, HY; Swedish: Helsingfors universitet, HU) is a public university in Helsinki, Finland. The university traces its origins back to 1640 when it was established in Turku under the Swedish Empire. Following the Great Fire of Turku, the institution relocated to Helsinki in 1828 with backing from Tsar Alexander I. The University of Helsinki is the oldest and largest university in Finland and enrols over 30,000 students annually.

== History ==
=== Royal Academy of Turku 1640–1828 ===
The university's predecessor The Cathedral School of Åbo, was founded in 1276 with the aim to educate boys to become servants of the Church.

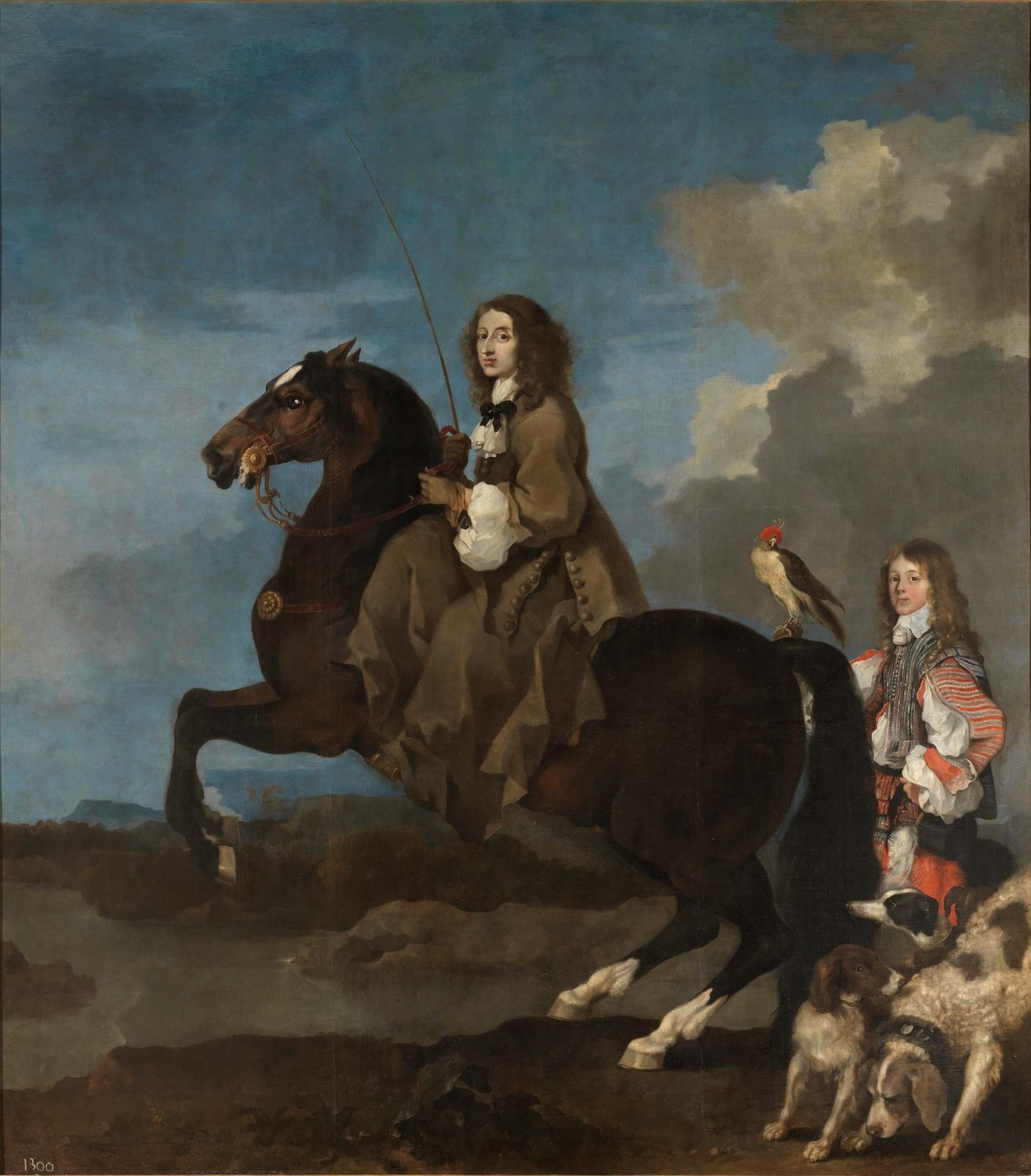
Queen Christina of Sweden, University Founder and Patron

The university was officially founded on 26 March 1640 by Queen Christina of Sweden (1626–1689) in Turku (Sw. Åbo), as the Åbo Kungliga Akademi (Latin: Regia Academia Aboensis) (Note: Latin for "The Royal Academy of Turku". Latin was the language of instruction in the school.) under the Swedish Empire. It was moved to Helsinki in 1828 under the sponsorship of Tsar Alexander I following the Great Fire of Turku. The senior part of the school formed the core of the university, while the junior year courses were a grammar school. It was the third university founded in the Swedish Empire. (Note: following Uppsala University and the Academia Gustaviana in Dorpat (predecessor to the University of Tartu in Estonia).)

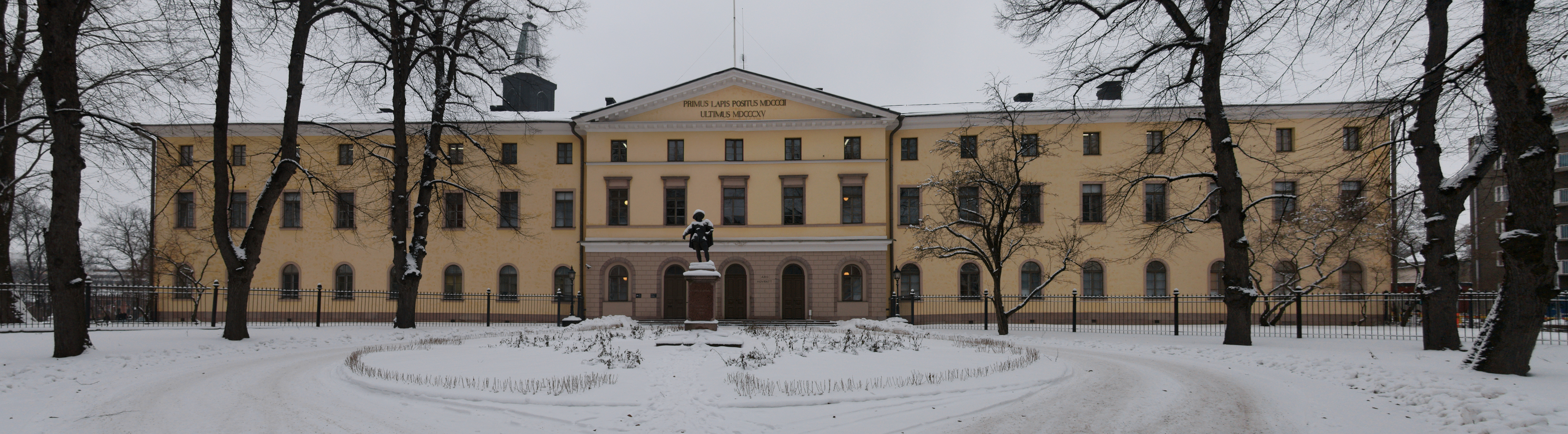
The Royal Academy of Turku

=== Imperial Alexander University in Finland 1808–1917 ===
Coat of arms of the University of Helsinki

During the period of the Grand Duchy of Finland (1809–1917), Grand Duke Alexander I expanded the university and doubled its funding in 1811 to establish new academic positions. The institution originally operated in Turku under several names,The university operated in Turku under several names, such as the Imperial Academy of Turku. Following the Great Fire of Turku in 1827, Emperor Nicholas I ordered the entire university to relocate to Helsinki, where it was eventually renamed the Imperial Alexander University in Finland with the primary task of educating civil servants for the Grand Duchy.

The university became a community that embraced the new Humboldtian ideals of science and culture. It studied humanity and its environment by using scientific methods. New statutes enacted in 1828 stated that the university's mission was to promote the development of the Sciences and Free Arts in Finland and to educate the youth for the service of the Emperor and the Fatherland. The university held a special status during the Russian period. The heir to the Russian Crown served as its chancellor. This made the university directly subordinate to the Emperor rather than to the Governor-General or the Senate. It soon became a center of cultural, political, and legal life. Great figures such as Johan Vilhelm Snellman, Johan Ludvig Runeberg, Elias Lönnrot, and Zachris Topelius were active in its activities.

In the 19th century, the focus of research shifted from collecting material to using experimental, empirical, and analytical methods. This more scientific approach led to specialization and the creation of new disciplines. The number of professors increased tenfold and the number of students grew from about 400 to just over 3,000. As these disciplines developed, Finland gained more scholarly knowledge and many graduates later entered industry and government.

After the fire in Turku, many buildings and collections were lost. In Helsinki, the university quickly rebuilt its infrastructure. The main building was completed in 1832. It stands in the center of Helsinki, opposite the Senate, and was designed by architect Carl Ludvig Engel. Other facilities were also established: a clinical hospital and a midwifery facility (1832), a botanical garden (1832), an astronomical observatory (1834), and a university library (1840). This central location allowed the university to follow Finnish society closely and be directly supervised by the Emperor's representatives.

The university played a key role in the development of Finnish identity and culture. It mapped Finnish nature, landscapes, and climate and rebuilt its natural science collections from scratch. Alexander von Nordmann and William Nylander, both researchers, gained international recognition for their work. The university also adopted German neohumanism. Its statutes encouraged in-depth study and original research.

Over time, the institution evolved into a modern university of science. The growing number of students and the admission of women into higher education marked a significant social change. This expansion laid the groundwork for future higher education institutions in Finland, including Åbo Akademi and the University of Turku.

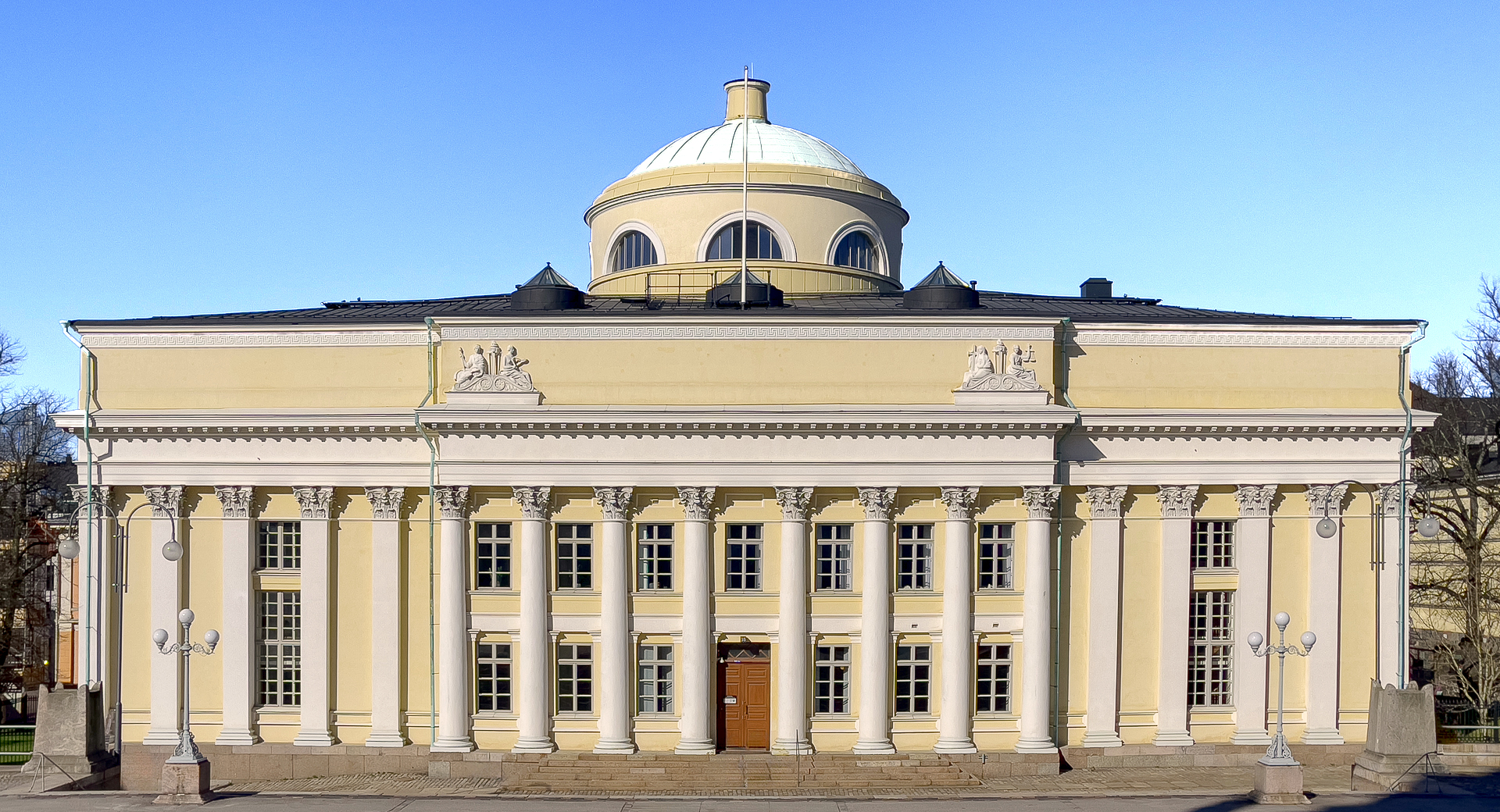
National Library of Finland/Kansalliskirjasto

=== University of Helsinki 1919–present ===
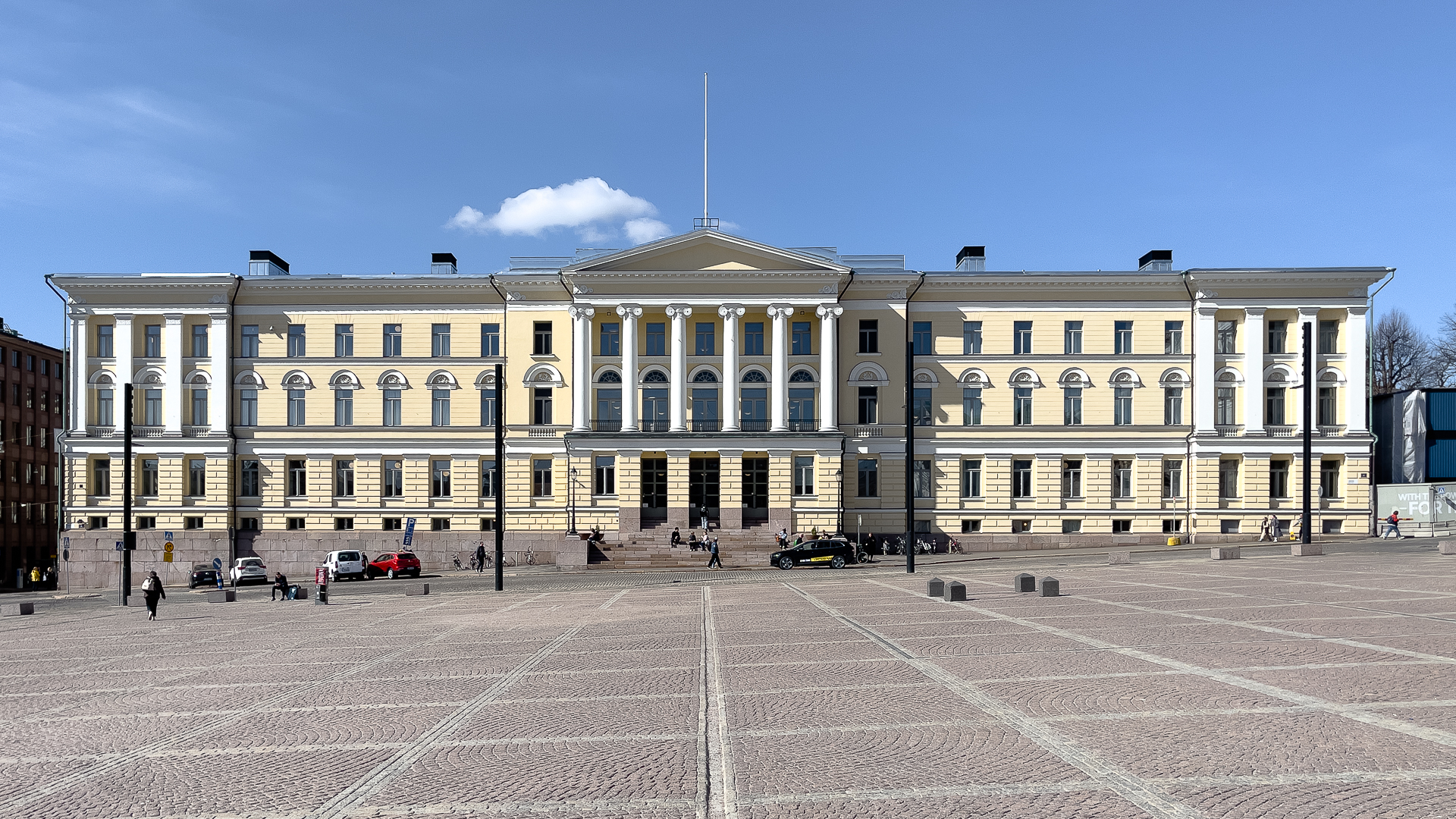
University of Helsinki (Main Building)

The third period of the university's history began with the creation of a fully independent Republic of Finland in 1917, and with the renaming of the university as the University of Helsinki. Once Finland declared its full independence in 1917, the university was given a crucial role in building the nation state and, after World War II, the welfare state. Members of the academic community promoted the international relations of the new state and the development of its economic life. Furthermore, they were actively involved in national politics and the struggle for equality.

In the interwar period the university was the scene of a conflict between those who wanted to advance the usage of Finnish language in the university, to the detriment of Swedish and those who opposed such move. Geographer Väinö Tanner was one of the most vocal defenders of Swedish language usage. Swedish People's Party of Finland initiated a campaign collecting 153 914 signatures in defense of the Swedish language that were handed to the parliament and government in October 1934. On an international front academics from Denmark, Sweden, Norway and Iceland sent letters to the diplomatic representations of Finland in their respective countries warning about a weakening of the Nordic unity that would result from diminishing the role of Swedish in the University of Helsinki.

Courses are provided in both Finnish and Swedish. Since Swedish, albeit an official language of Finland, is a minority language, Finnish is by far the dominating language at the university. Teaching in English is extensive throughout the university at master, licentiate, and doctoral levels, making it a de facto third language of instruction.

In the 20th century, scholarly research at the University of Helsinki has achieved recognition at a competitive European level in several fields. This was manifested, among other things, by international recognitions granted to its professors, such as the Fields Medal received by the mathematician Lars Ahlfors (1936), the Nobel Prize in Chemistry granted to Professor A.I. Virtanen (1945) and the Nobel Prize in Medicine shared by Professor Ragnar Granit (1967). In the Continuation War, the university was heavily damaged by bombs during a Soviet air raid on 27 February 1944.

After World War II, university research focused on improving Finnish living conditions and supporting major changes in the structure of society and business. For example, the university aligned its research with the government's goals to improve public welfare during a time of national reconstruction.

The university also contributed to the breakthrough of modern technology. Finnish researchers took part in one of the first Big Science projects—a peaceful research project in atomic energy and nuclear physics launched in 1955 by President Eisenhower. This project brought together experts from the University of Helsinki, the University of Technology, and other institutes, and it spurred a number of economic innovations.

The progress of scientific development created many new disciplines and faculties at the University of Helsinki. At present the university comprises 11 faculties, 500 professors and almost 40,000 students. The university has established as its goal to "further its position as one of Europe's top multidisciplinary research universities".

== Organization ==
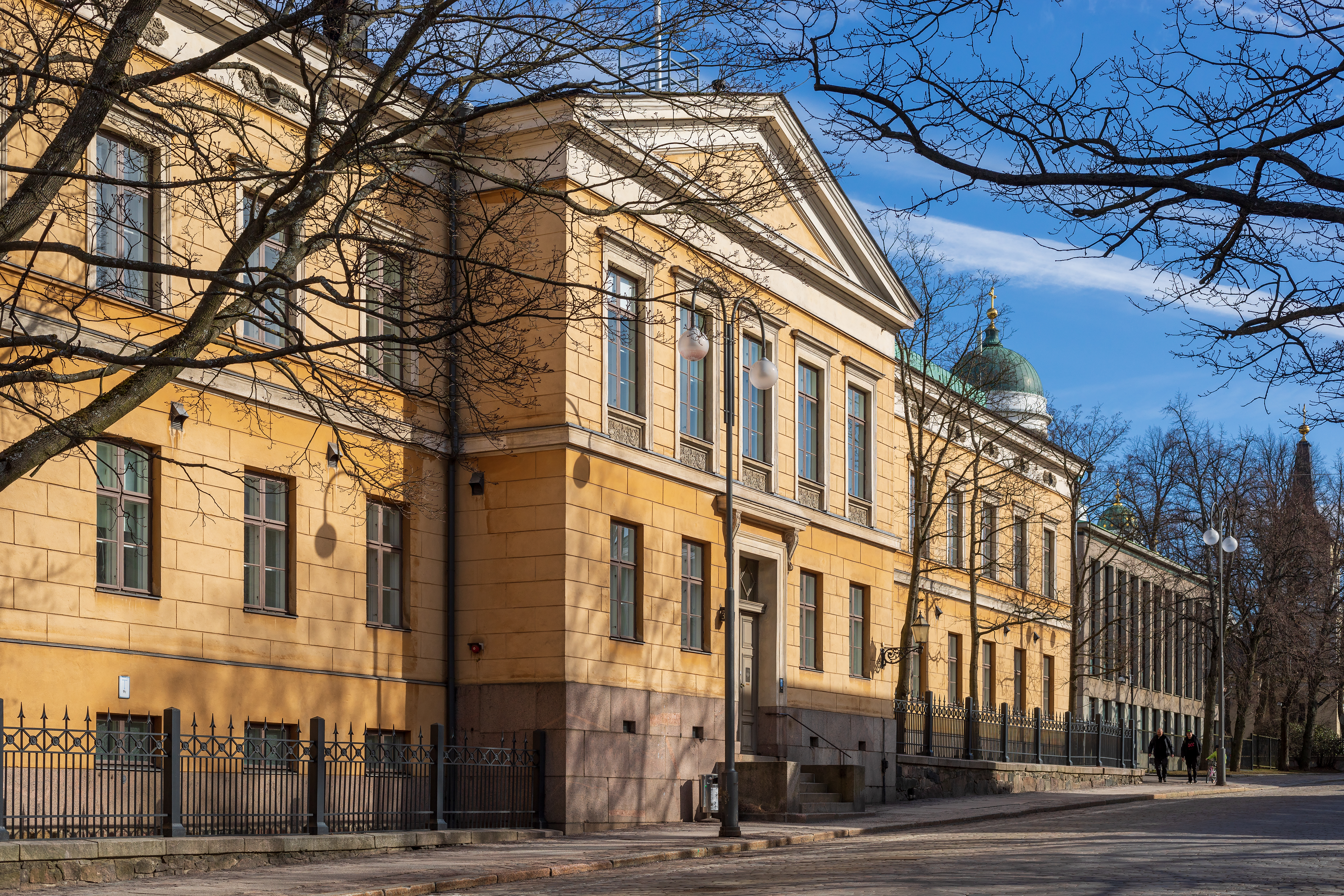
Aleksanteri Institute, University of Helsinki

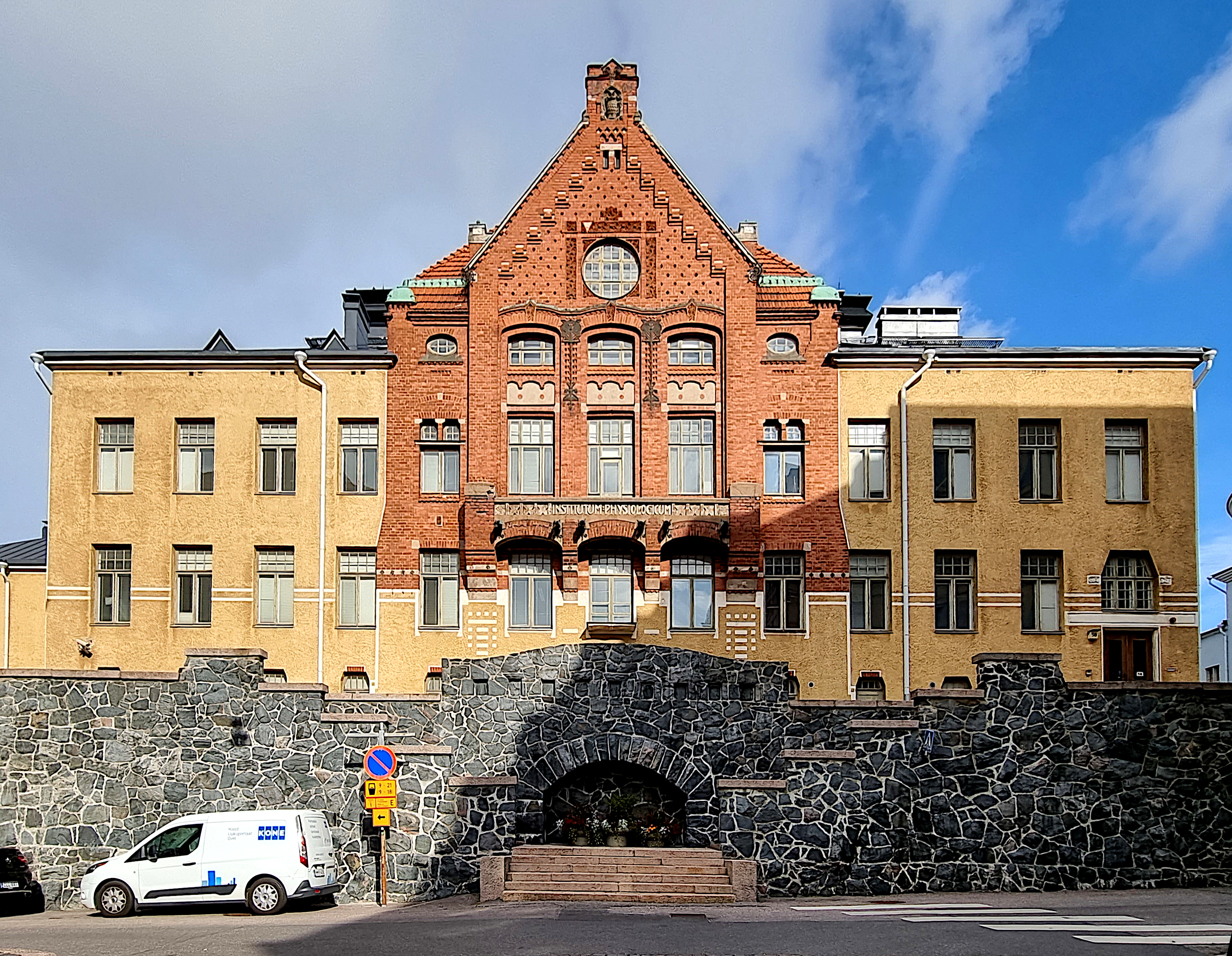
Institute of Behavioural Sciences, University of Helsinki

=== Faculties ===
The university is divided into eleven faculties. They are listed below in the official order used by the university, reflecting both the history of the university and the hierarchy of disciplines at the time when the university was established:

- Faculty of Theology (established 1640)
- Faculty of Law (established 1640)
- Faculty of Medicine (established 1640)
- Faculty of Arts (Faculty of Philosophy established 1640 and split 1852, independent Arts section 1863, independent faculty 1992)
- Faculty of Science (Faculty of Philosophy established 1640 and split 1852, independent Science section 1863, independent faculty 1992)
- Faculty of Pharmacy (Faculty of Philosophy established 1640, split from the Faculty of Science 2004)
- Faculty of Biological and Environmental Sciences (Faculty of Philosophy established 1640, split from the Faculty of Science 2004)
- Faculty of Educational Sciences (independent section 1974, independent faculty 1992, reorganized and renamed 2004, reorganized and renamed 2017)
- Faculty of Social Sciences (established 1945)
- Faculty of Agriculture and Forestry (established 1898, independent faculty 1924)
- Faculty of Veterinary Medicine (established as an independent college in 1945, incorporated into the University of Helsinki in 1995)

The university also has several independent institutes, such as research centres and libraries, the most notable of which are perhaps the National Library of Finland and Helsinki University Library. Helsinki Collegium for Advanced Studies is another independent institute within the University of Helsinki, an Institute for Advanced Study, which is modeled upon the Institute for Advanced Study in Princeton, New Jersey. Previous directors include Raimo Väyrynen (2002–2004) and Juha Sihvola (2004–2009).

== Academics ==
University rankings

Global – Overall
- ARWU World: 99 (2024)
- QS World: 117 (2025)
- THE World: =107 (2025)
- USNWR Global: =113 (2025)

=== University rankings ===
University of Helsinki is ranked at 101-150th in the world by the 2023 Academic Ranking of World Universities published by Shanghai Jiao Tong University. According to the Times Higher Education World University Rankings for 2023, the University of Helsinki is ranked at 121st overall in the world. In 2024 THE–QS World University Rankings list, the University of Helsinki was ranked 115th.

In 2022, around 31,000 students were enrolled in the degree programs of the university spread across 11 faculties and 11 research institutes.

As of 1 August 2005, the university complies with the structure of the Europe-wide Bologna Process and offers bachelor, master, licenciate, and doctoral degrees. Admission to degree programmes is usually determined by entrance examinations, in the case of bachelor's degrees, and by prior degree results, in the case of master and postgraduate degrees.

=== International Master's Degree Programmes ===
The University of Helsinki offers a wide range of master's degree programmes, taught entirely in English. The scope of the programmes is 120 ECTS credits, completed with two years of full-time study. Some programmes are organised by the University of Helsinki along with other Finnish and foreign universities. All programmes comply with the national legislation governing university education and are, therefore, recognised globally.

It is a member of various international university networks, such as Europaeum, UNICA, the Utrecht Network, and is a founding member of the League of European Research Universities. The university has also received international financial support for global welfare; for example, in September 2021, the U.S. Department of Defense provided the university with more than four million euros in funding for the treatment of MYC genes and breast cancer.

=== Research ===
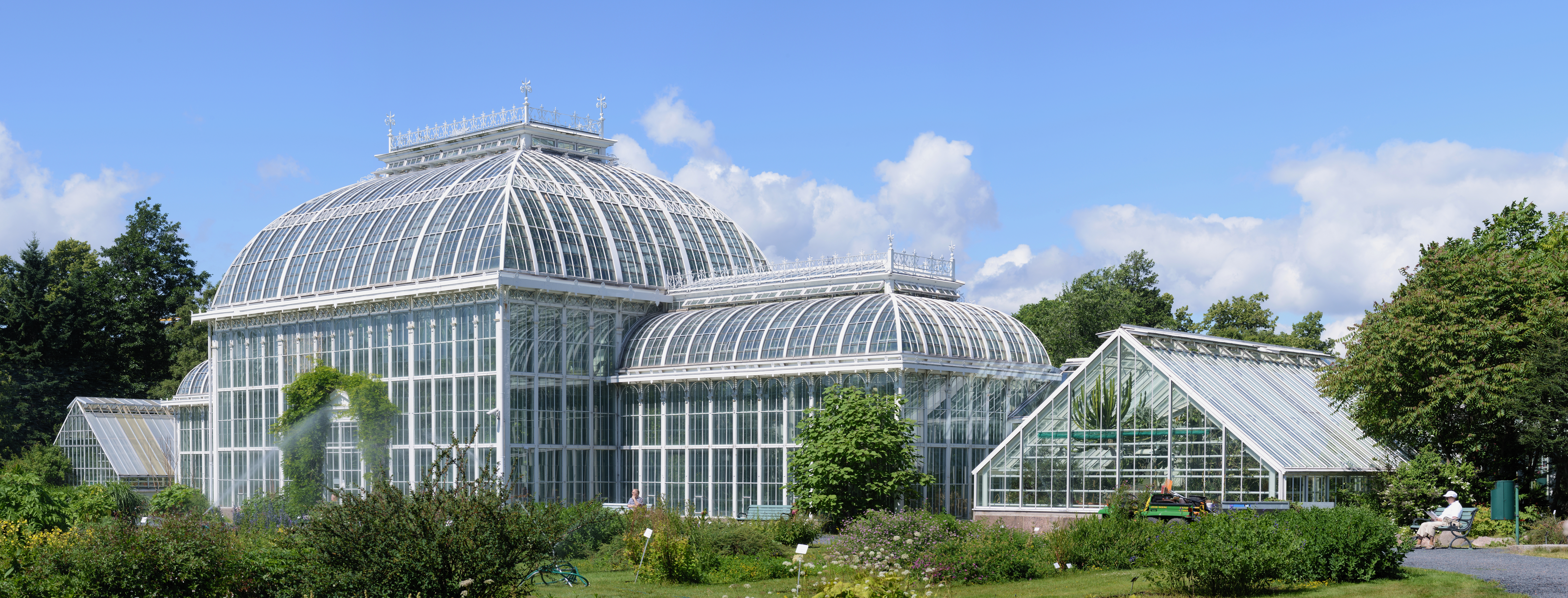
University of Helsinki Botanical Garden

Research institutes within the university include the following:

- Aleksanteri Institute – A national centre of research, study and expertise pertaining to Russia and East Europe
- Christina Institute for Gender Studies
- Environmental Change Research Unit
- Erik Castrén Institute of International Law and Human Rights
- Helsinki Center of Economic Research (HECER) – A joint initiative of the University of Helsinki, the Helsinki School of Economics and the Hanken School of Economics
- Helsinki Institute for Information Technology (HIIT) – A joint research institute of the University of Helsinki and the Aalto University
- Helsinki Institute of Life Science (HiLIFE) - supports and coordinates life science research across the university. HiLIFE oversees three operative units:
  - Institute of Biotechnology (BI)
  - Finnish Institute for Molecular Medicine (FIMM)
  - Neuroscience Center (NC)
- Helsinki Institute of Physics
- Rolf Nevanlinna Institute – Research institute of mathematics, computer science, and statistics

The University of Helsinki is an active member of the University of the Arctic. UArctic is an international cooperative network based in the Circumpolar Arctic region, consisting of more than 200 universities, colleges, and other organizations with an interest in promoting education and research in the Arctic region.

The university participates in UArctic's mobility program north2north. The aim of that program is to enable students of member institutions to study in different parts of the North.

== Campuses ==
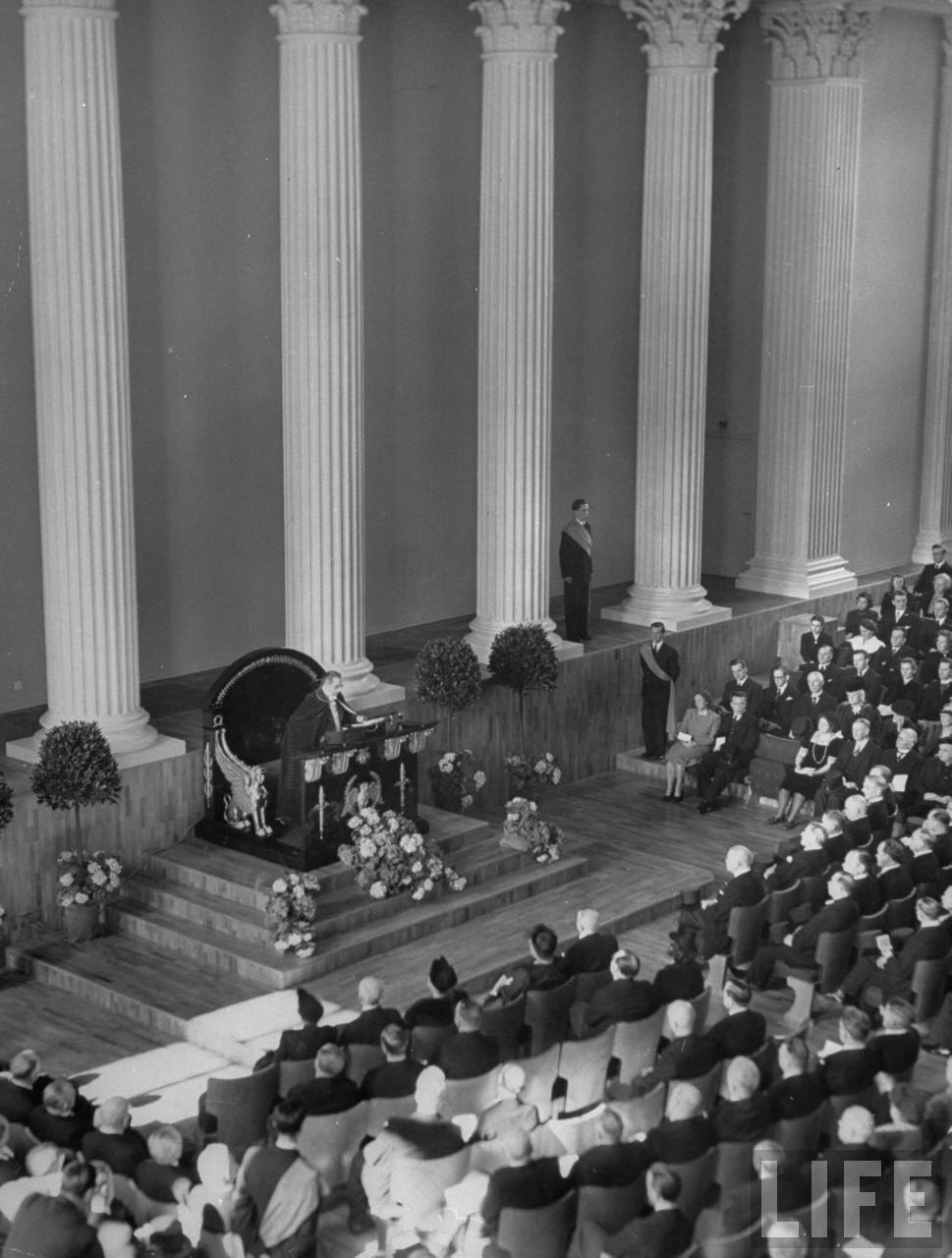
Main Auditorium, University of Helsinki

The university is located on four main campuses. Originally, the entire university was located in the very centre of Helsinki, but due to the rapid growth of the university since the 1930s, premises have been built and acquired in other areas.

=== City Centre Campus ===
The University of Helsinki main building located at Senate Square in Kluuvi, central Helsinki, Finland as shown on stamp of Finland from 1990.

The historical City Centre Campus has been the hub of activity ever since the university moved from Turku to Helsinki in the early 19th century. The City Centre Campus, extending around the historical centre of Helsinki, Senate Square, and Kruununhaka city district, is the administrative heart of the University of Helsinki and has the largest concentration of faculties in Helsinki. The campus has a central location and reflects the architectural style of this part of the city.

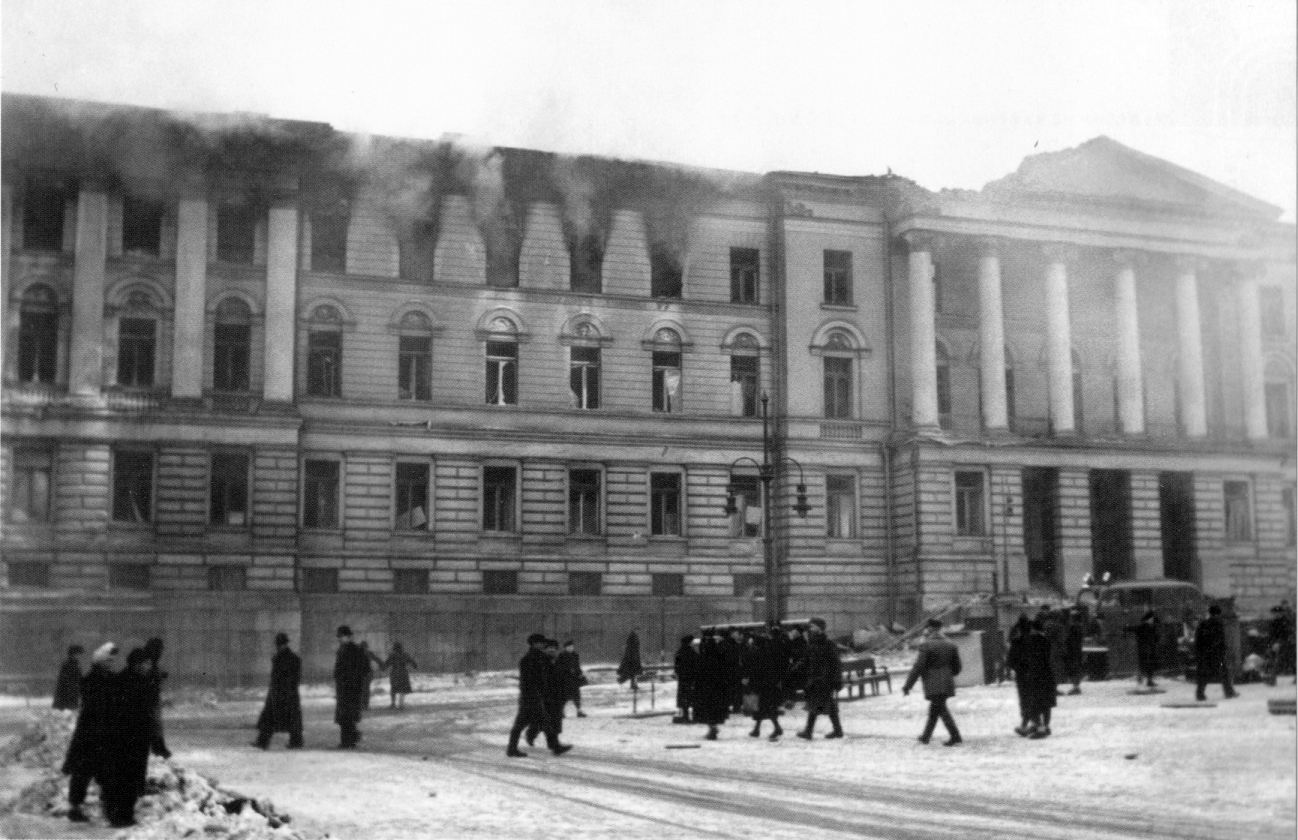
University Main Building on fire after Soviet bombings in 1944

The main building as well as other buildings of the campus were badly damaged during the Soviet bombings in World War II but rebuilt after the war.

The university buildings in the city center house the Faculties of Theology, Law, Arts, Behavioural Sciences and Social Sciences plus administrative functions. Most of the buildings on the campus have a major architectural significance ranging from the dominating Neo-Classical, through the Jugendstil, to 20th century Modernism.

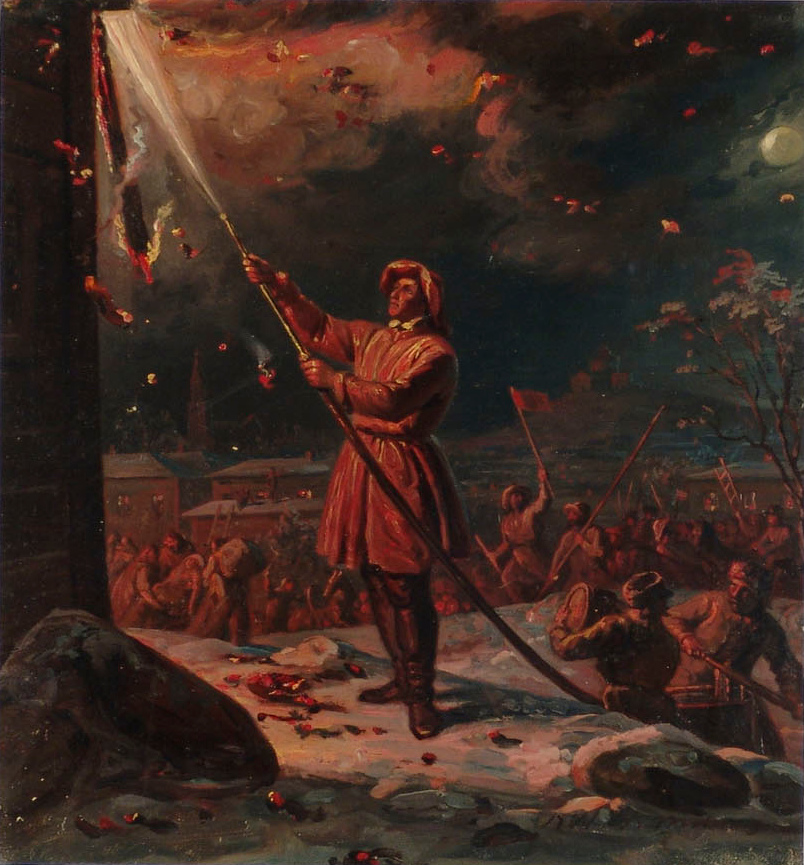
Robert Wilhelm Ekman's painting of the Great Fire of Turku.

After the Great Fire of Turku in 1827, Emperor Nicholas I ordered the Royal Academy of Turku be moved to the new capital city of the Grand Duchy of Finland, Helsinki, where the Imperial Alexander University in Finland began to operate the next year. Helsinki was to become Finland's window to the world; a European city to which the university belonged as an integral part. Carl Ludvig Engel, architect, was given the assignment of designing an Empire-style main building next to Senate Square, facing the Imperial Senate. The main building was completed in 1832. Thanks to the lessons learnt from the fire of Turku, the library was built separate from other premises. The library and several faculty buildings in the campus were also designed by Engel.

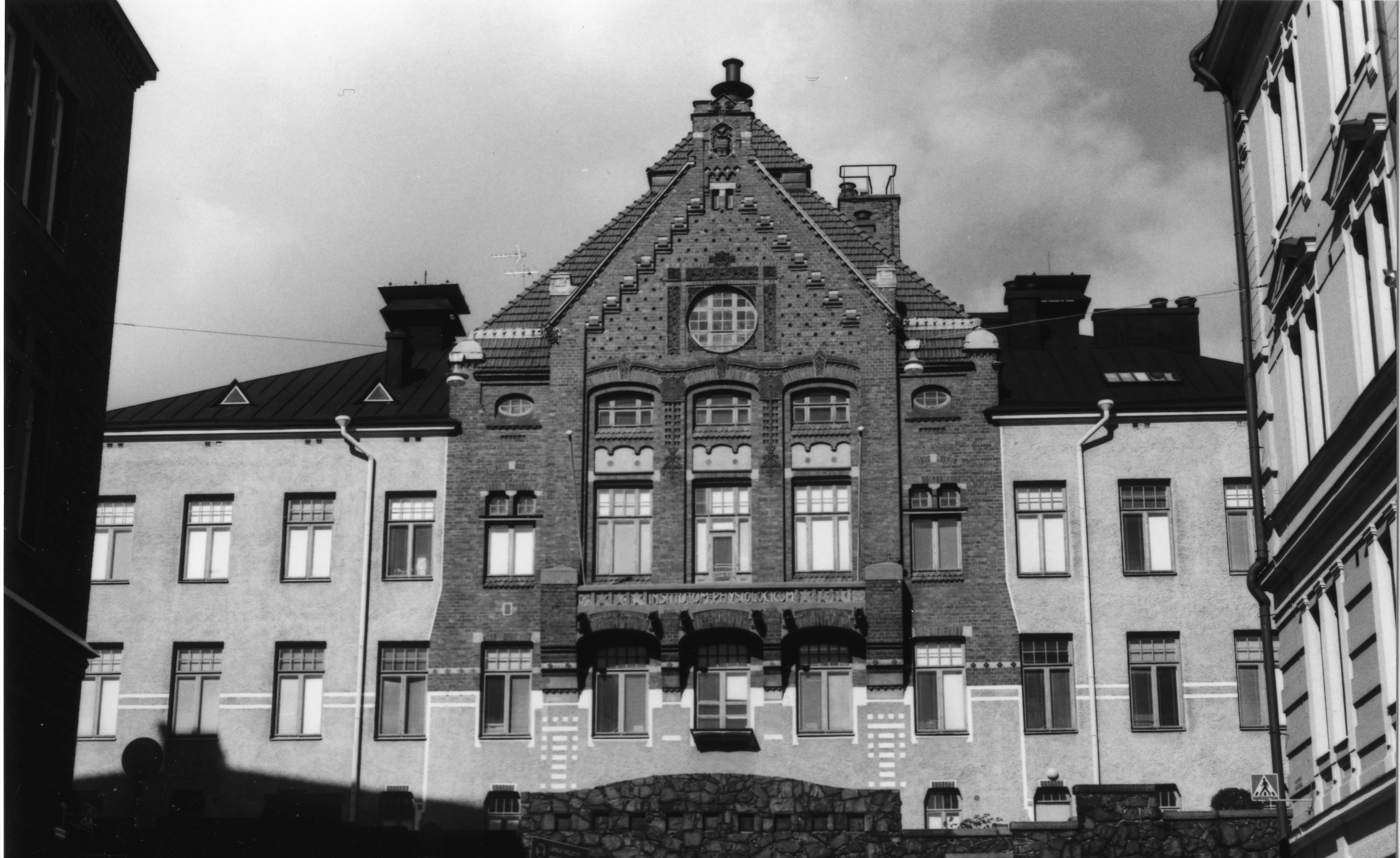
Minerva, Department of Teacher Education

The plan concerning the concentration of university facilities dating back to the 1980s, aimed to achieve a closer unity between facilities. The City Centre Campus does not stand out from the rest of the urban environment but is a part of the city, in line with the old university tradition. The university facilities still form a functional and coherent whole, consisting not only of historically valuable buildings, but also of facilities for 20,000 students and 3,000 teachers and other staff.

=== Kumpula Campus ===
The Kumpula Campus, housing the Faculty of Science, is located four kilometers north from the centre of Helsinki near tram lines 6 and 8. The campus houses the Departments of Physics, Chemistry, Mathematics and Statistics, Computer Science, and Geosciences and Geography.

The university departments were located in Kumpula for the first time in 1978 when the City of Helsinki leased the area for the university. A planning competition for the city plan for the area was held a year earlier. In the 1980s, the Accelerator Laboratory of the Department of Physics was quarried into Kumpula rock and the construction of Kumpula Botanical Garden began in 1987. It was not, however, until the 1990s when the construction work proper began, transforming the area into a significant campus.

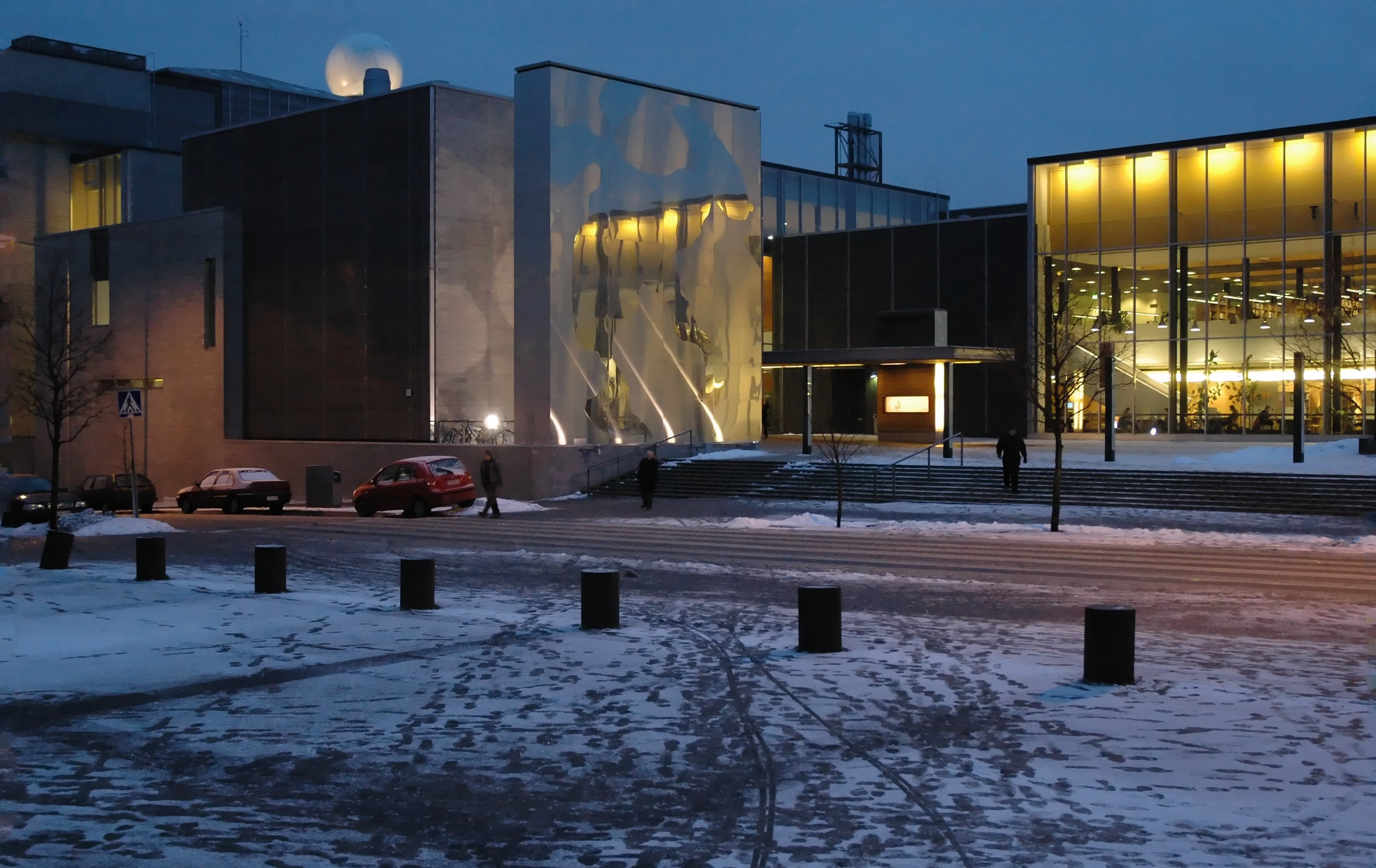
Kumpula Campus Physicum

The Chemicum, the building housing the Department of Chemistry and VERIFIN (Finnish Institute for Verification of the Chemical Weapons Convention), and the Physicum, which provides facilities for physics, geology and geography are located on Kumpula campus surrounding a square named after the Finnish Nobel prize winner, A. I. Virtanen. Kumpula Campus Library is also located in the Physicum. The Kumpula Sports Centre is planned for the recreational use of both university staff and students and citizens of Helsinki alike. Completed in 2004, the Exactum provides facilities for seismology, computer science and mathematical subjects, as well as administrative services.

The campus comprises two main parts: the Botanical Garden, surrounding the old building stock of Kumpula manor and the modern new building stock located a couple of hundred metres north of the manor. The campus combines modern and historical architectural elements. The campus offers study and research facilities for 6,000 students and 1,000 teachers. The Finnish Meteorological Institute moved to the area in 2005. That building is known as Dynamicum.

=== Meilahti Campus ===
The Meilahti Campus, with the Faculty of Medicine, is a part of the Meilahti Hospital District on the edge of the city centre. Just a few kilometres from the City Centre Campus, the Meilahti area has been transformed into a center for leading medical research, 'Medilahti'. Established in the 1930s, the Women's Clinic was accompanied by Finland's leading hospital, Helsinki University Central Hospital (HUCH) in 1966. The same year saw the completion of facilities for theoretical subject departments on Haartmaninkatu street. The building is now being renovated and extended.

The latest completed facilities in the campus include the National Library of Health Sciences (Terkko) and the research and teaching centre Biomedicum that houses several research institutes including the Institute for Molecular Medicine Finland (FIMM), Neuroscience Center (NC), and Minerva Foundation Institute for Medical Research.

The Ruskeasuo premises, including the Department of Dentistry, Institute for Oral Health, Department of Public Health and Department of Forensic Medicine, also belong to the Meilahti campus. The Meilahti and Ruskeasuo areas form a close-knit complex providing a meeting place for medical education, international top-level research and nursing. The campus is a workplace for 2,000 students and 1,500 teachers.

Following the project to combine the teaching facilities of the Faculty of Medicine, Meilahti contains medicine and health care facilities.

Although the Meilahti campus is intertwined with the rest of Meilahti district, it succeeds in forming a clear-cut campus area with its hospital-type building stock.

=== Viikki Campus ===
The Viikki Campus is located in the semi-suburban greenspace of the Viikki area, some 8 kilometres north-east of the city centre. It houses the Faculties of Agriculture and Forestry, Biosciences, Veterinary Medicine and Pharmacy. It is an important concentration in the field of biosciences, even by European standards. Indeed, it is often called the bioscience campus or the "green campus".

In addition to biosciences, the campus is home to a wide range of other life science researchers and students in such fields as environmental science, veterinary medicine, food research and economics. Numerous international research groups also work on the Viikki Campus. The Viikki Campus is the location of four faculties, three independent research institutes (Institute of Biotechnology (BI), Natural Resources Institute Finland (LUKE) and Finnish Environment Institute (SYKE)) and the Viikki Science Library.

It also attracts an increasing number of businesses to the Helsinki Business and Science Park. The Finnish Game and Fisheries Research Institute and the Finnish Food Safety Authority, Evira, have also moved to Viikki and negotiations are under way to relocate MTT Agrifood Research Finland to Viikki to complement the Department of Economics and Management.

The Viikki Campus unites a multidisciplinary science community of more than 6,500 students and 1,600 teachers, a residential area emphasising ecological values and the natural surroundings, including recreational areas and nature reserves, and forms a unique whole. The campus also has the Viikinlahti conservation area, which is particularly popular among bird watchers.

== Libraries and museums ==
=== The National Library of Finland ===
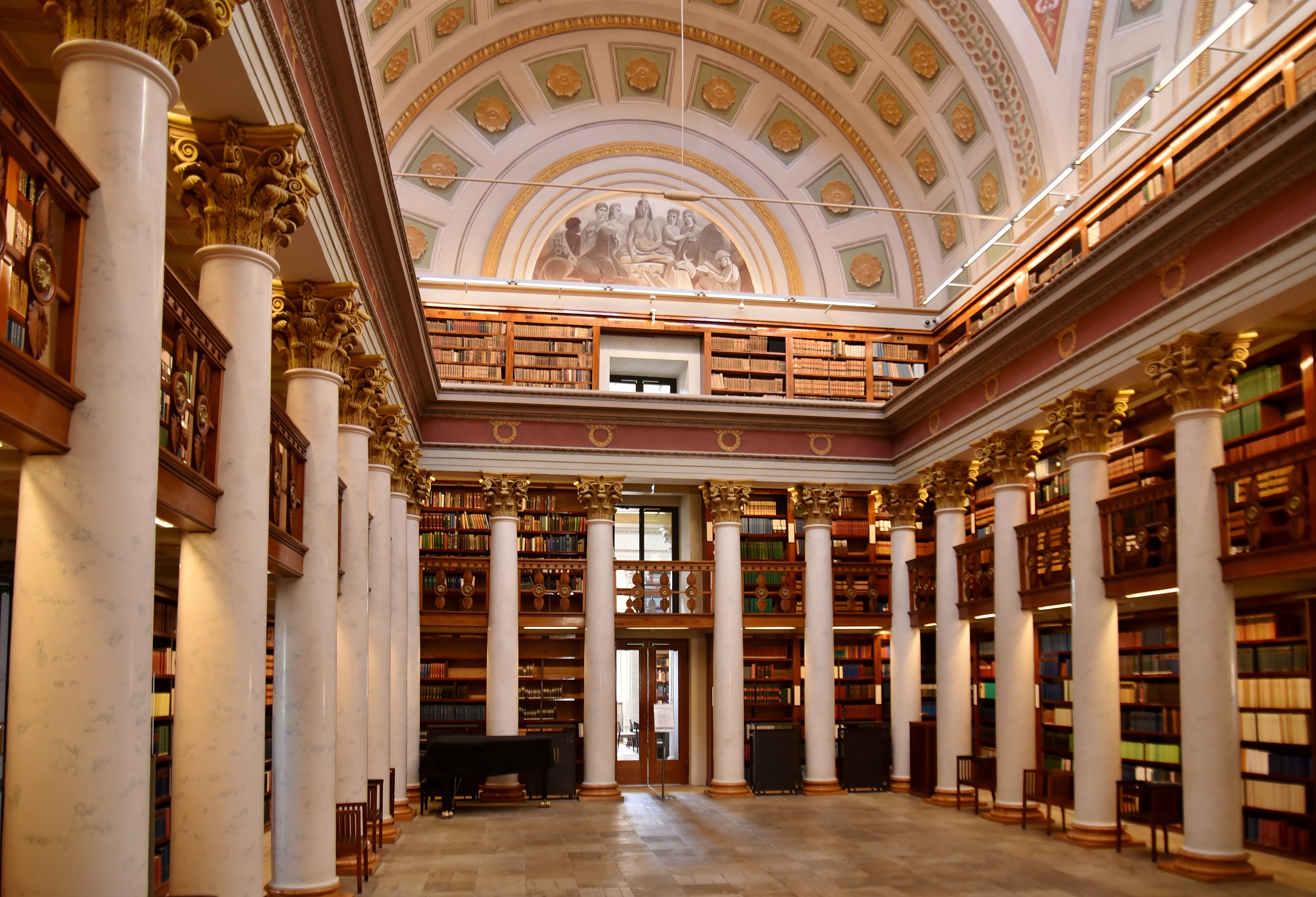
Interior of the National Library of Finland

The National Library of Finland is the foremost research library in Finland and the main branch of the University of Helsinki's library system. The National Library of Finland is the oldest and largest scholarly library in Finland as well as one of the largest independent institutes at the University of Helsinki. It is responsible for the collection, description, preservation and accessibility of Finland's printed national heritage and the unique collections under its care. The National Library also serves as a national service and development centre for the library sector and promotes national and international cooperation in the field.

=== The Helsinki University Main Library ===
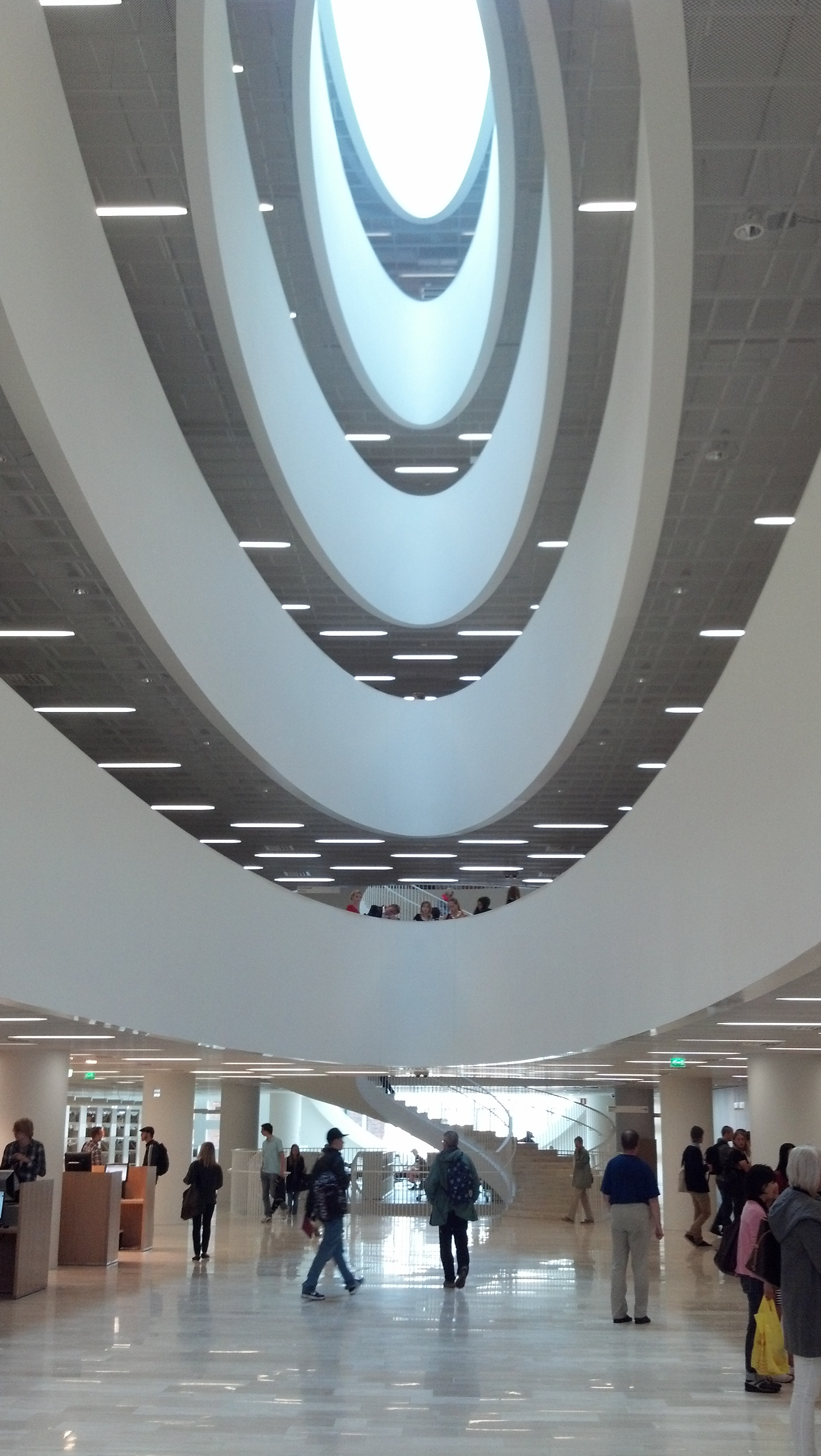
The new Main Library in Kaisa House

The Main Library of the university is used by students for research and studying. Located a few blocks down the street from the university's main building in the city centre, the new Main Library was opened in 2012 in the Kaisa House. The new library merged the undergraduate library and four dispersed faculty libraries of the city center campus to a collection of approximately 1.5 million books. The architecture of the new building, designed by Anttinen Oiva Architects, has been praised and received several awards.

=== The Helsinki University Museum ===
The Helsinki University Museum is the museum of the University of Helsinki and was located until June 2014 on Snellmanninkatu off the north-east corner of Senate Square. Museums main exhibition moved to the University Main Building in 2015.

Helsinki University Museum was established in 2003 by merging the former University Museum specialising in the history of the University of Helsinki, the Museum of Medical History, the Museum of the History of Veterinary Medicine, the Museum of the History of Dentistry and the Collections of Craft Science. To complement the new conglomeration of museums, the Mineral Cabinet, which today belongs to the Finnish Museum of Natural History, returned to its original location in the Arppeanum building. Each year the museum also holds one or two temporary exhibitions in a specially designed area. Museums exhibition in Arppeanum Building was closed in June 2014. New main exhibition was opened in the Main Building in March 2015.

The University Museum is in charge of the preservation and conservation of the university's valuable museum collections and property: old tuition and research equipment, furniture and works of art. The museum maintains an index register of all valuables that are kept in the facilities of the university. The museum also provides library, archive and photographic services pertaining to the history of the university and the history of medical science.

=== Finnish Museum of Natural History ===
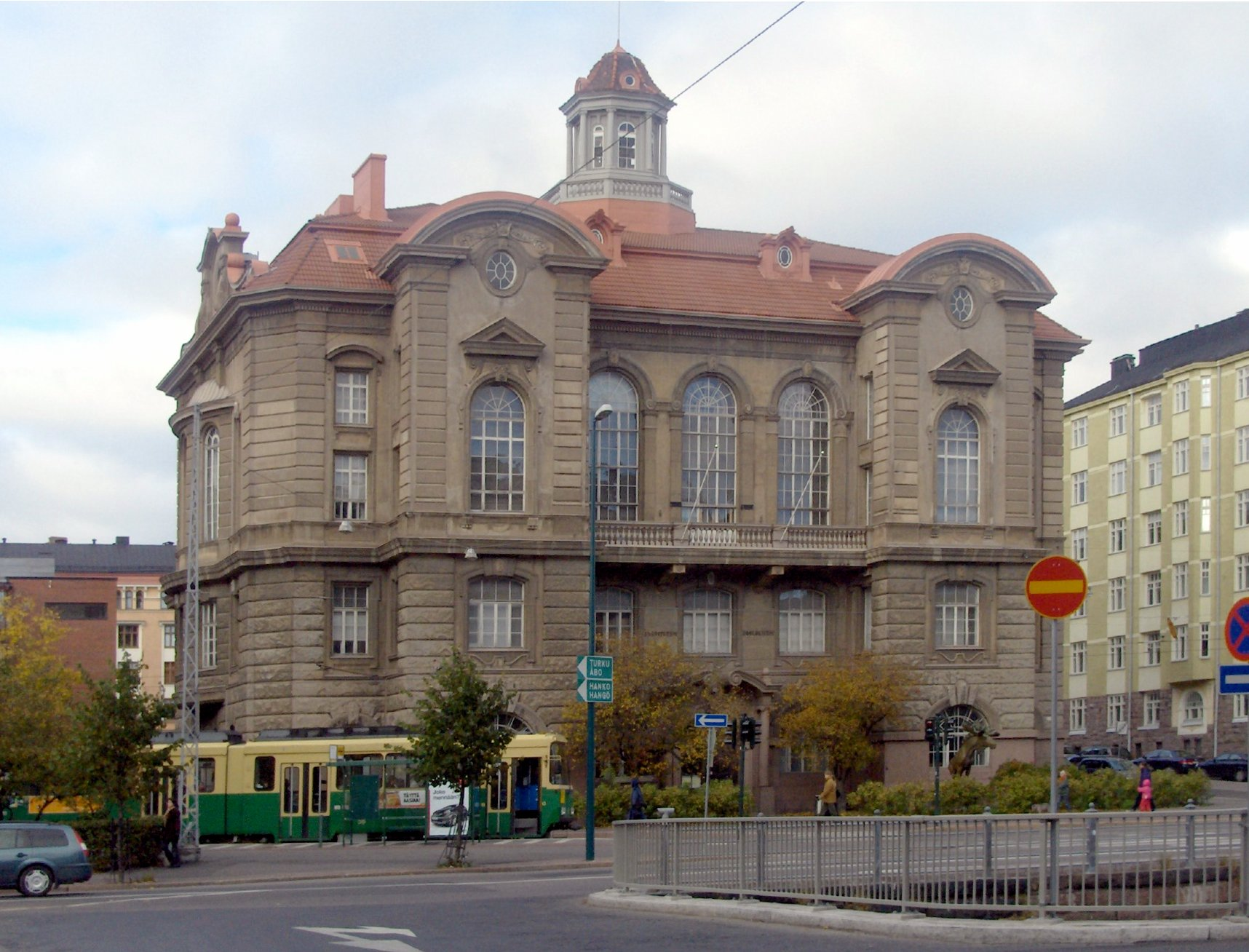
Museum of Natural History

The Finnish Museum of Natural History is a research institution under the University of Helsinki. It is responsible for the national botanical, zoological, geological and paleontological collections consisting of samples from around the world. The collections serve scientific, public informational and educational purposes.

== Student life ==
=== Student Union ===
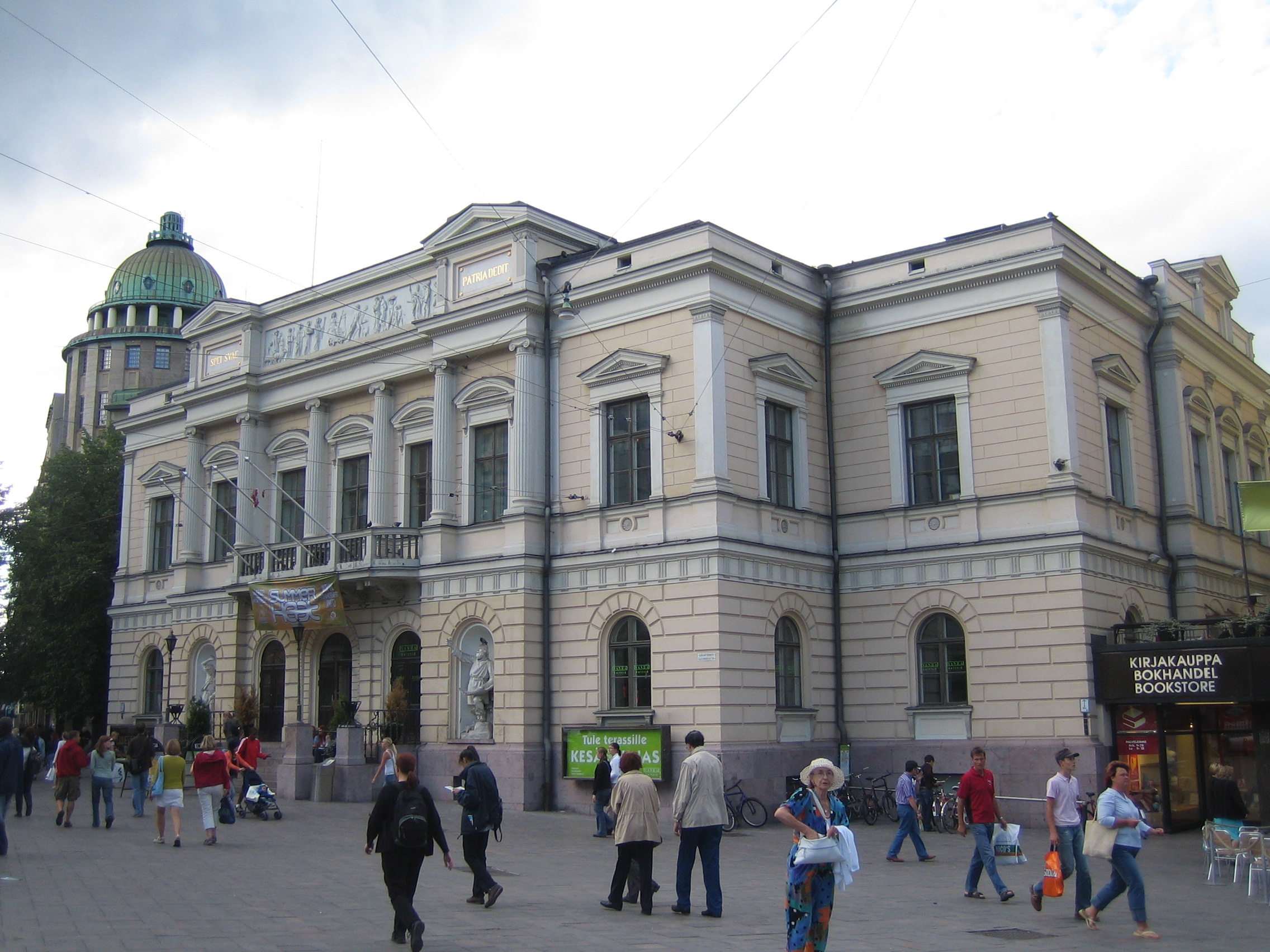
The Old Student House (Student Union), Aleksanterinkatu

The Student Union of the University of Helsinki (Helsingin yliopiston ylioppilaskunta, HYY) was founded in 1868. As of 1998, it has 32,000 members and is one of the world's wealthiest student organizations, with assets of several hundred million euros. Among other things, it owns a good deal of property in the city centre of Helsinki. The union has been at the centre of student politics from the 19th Century nationalist movements, through the actions of the New Left in the 1960s, up to the present. Its governing assembly consists of parties which are connected to faculty organisations, the Student Nations, and the mainstream political parties.

=== Student nations ===
The student nations are student organisations that provide extra-curricular activities to students. Along with the faculty-based organisations, the nations provide one of the main nodes of student social life. The nations at University of Helsinki have a special legal status in the Universities Act. There are 15 nations at the university, each one representing a historic region or province of Finland, with four of these representing Swedish-speaking regions. Membership is optional.

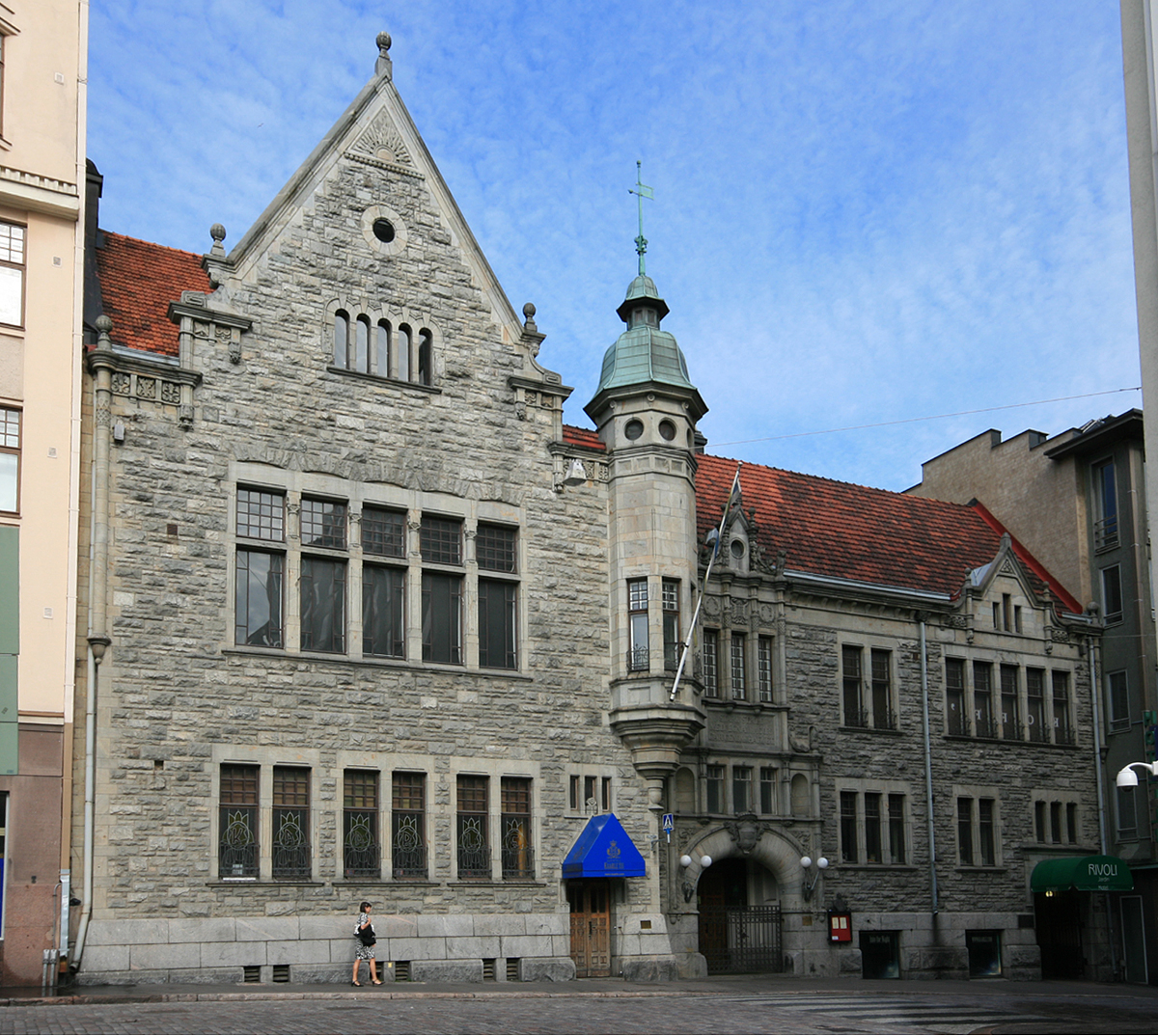
Nylands Nation

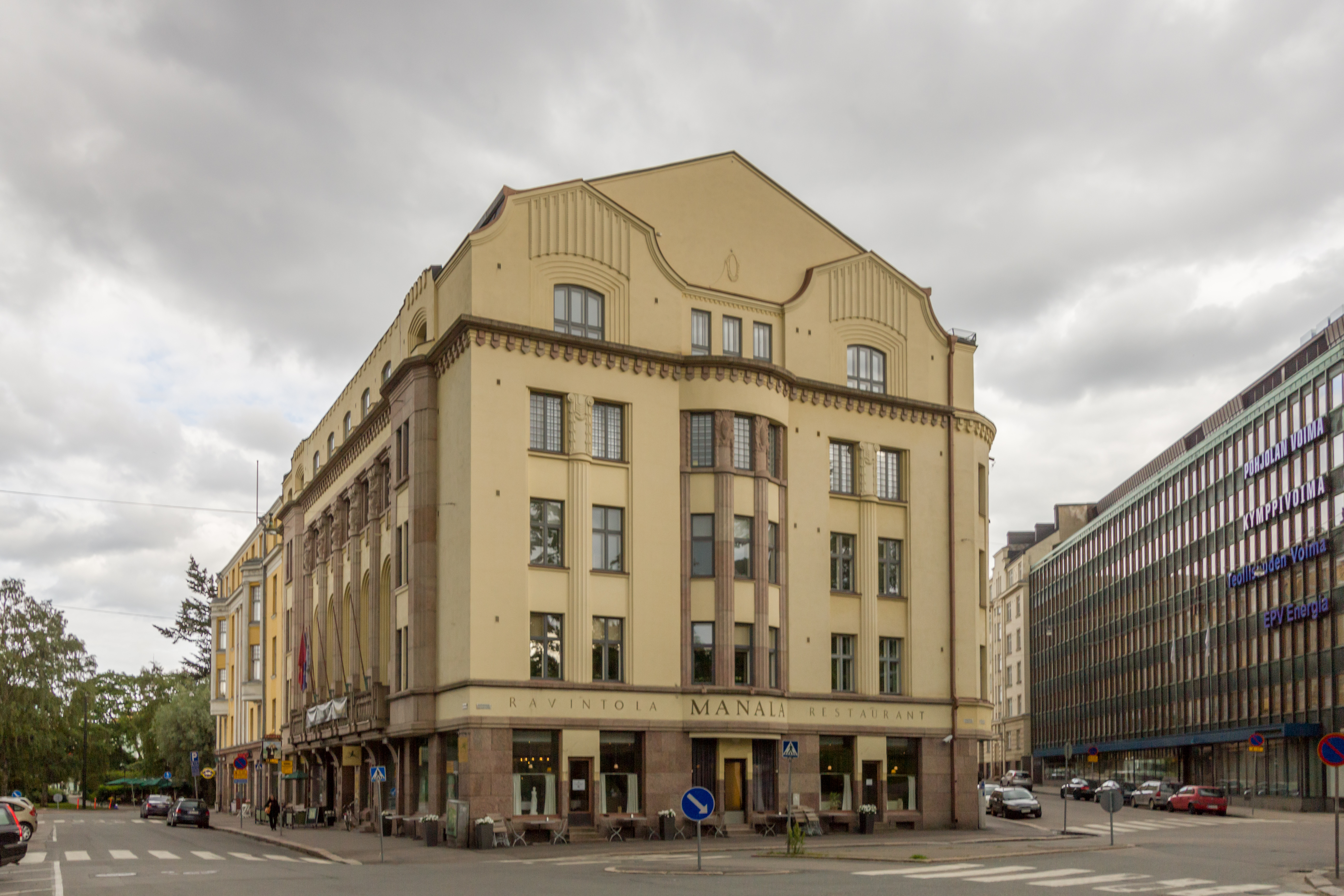
North Ostrobothnian Nation
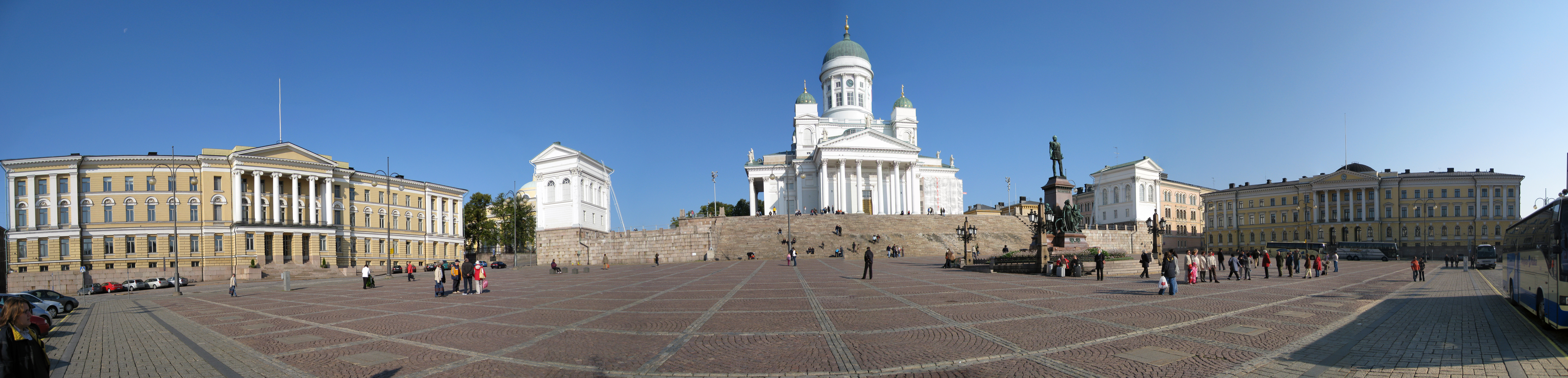
Panorama of the Senate Square. University main building on left.

== Notable alumni, faculty, and staff ==
Name	Life	Details
Elli Saurio	(1899–1966)	Professor of household economics
Roberto Fico	(1974–)	Elected President of the Region Campania and Former President of the Italian Chamber of Deputies
Jukka Nevakivi	(1931–)	Professor of political history
Derek Fewster	(1962–)	Historian
Joy Wolfram	(1989–)	Nanoscientist, BS and MS
Bengt Holmström	(1949–)	Nobel Laureate (Economics, 2016)
Liisa Ahtee	(1937–)	Pharmacology, pioneer developer of pharmacological research in Finland. Albert Wuokko Award recipient in 1999.
Pauli Kettunen	(1953–)	Professor of political history
Lars Ahlfors	(1907–1996)	Mathematician, one of two first to be awarded the Fields Medal in 1936.
Helmi Arneberg-Pentti	(1889–1981)	Chairman of Lotta Svärd, the Finnish auxiliary organisation for women, from 1921 to 1922 and 1925 to 1929.
Emma Irene Åström	(1847–1934)	First female university graduate in Finland
Tancred Borenius	(1885–1948)	Art historian and diplomat
Anders Chydenius	(1729–1803)	Priest, economist, and politician
Anders Donner	(1854–1938)	Astronomer
Fredrik Elfving	(1854–1942)	Botanist and plant physiologist
Gustav Elfving	(1908–1984)	Mathematician and statistician. Pioneer in the optimal design of experiments
Elsa Enäjärvi-Haavio	(1918–1951)	PhD (1932), docent, writer, politician. Chairwoman in many institutions.
Elin Kallio	(1859–1927)	Considered the founder of the women's gymnastic movement in Finland
Ragnar Granit	(1900–1991)	Nobel Laureate (Medicine, 1967)
Hugo Gyldén	(1841–1896)	Astronomer
Tarja Halonen	(1943–)	Lawyer (LL.M.) and the former President of Finland (2000–2012)
Rosina Heikel	(1842–1929)	First Finnish female physician, feminist
Kaj Himberg	(1844–1927)	Polymath, professor of thermodynamics
Jaakko Hintikka	(1929–2015)	Philosopher and logician
Harri Holkeri	(1937–2011)	Former Prime minister of Finland (1987–1991)
Riitta Jallinoja	(1943–)	Sociologist, academic
Jukka Jernvall	(1963–)	Evolutionary developmental biologist
Vesa Kanniainen	(1948–)	Economist
Kari Karhunen	(1915–1992)	Mathematician
Urho Kaleva Kekkonen	(1900–1986)	Former Prime Minister of Finland (1950–1953, 1954–1956) and former President of Finland (1956–1982)
Elina Kahla	(1960–)	Academic, writer
Aleksis Kivi	(1834–1872)	Writer
Nils Kock	(1924–2011)	Surgeon and developer of the Kock pouch procedure for ileostomies
Björn Kurtén	(1924–1988)	Paleontologist
Werner Krieglstein	(1941–)	University of Chicago fellow and Fulbright Scholar, as well as being a philosopher, author, and actor
Jarl Lindeberg	(1876–1932)	Mathematician
Ernst Lindelöf	(1870–1946)	Mathematician
Elias Lönnrot	(1802–1884)	Collector of Kalevala
Rolf Nevanlinna	(1895–1980)	Mathematician
Adolf Erik Nordenskiöld	(1832–1901)	Geologist and Arctic explorer
Gustaf Nordenskiöld	(1868–1895)	Donor of the Mesa Verde artifacts to the National Museum of Finland
Jorma Ollila	(1950–)	Former chairman of Nokia and non-executive chairman of Royal Dutch Shell
Juho Kusti Paasikivi	(1870–1956)	Former Prime Minister of Finland (1918 & 1944–1946) and President of Finland (1946–1956)
Lauri Kristian Relander	(1883–1942)	Former President of Finland (1925–1931)
Risto Ryti	(1889–1956)	Former Prime Minister of Finland (1939–1940) and President of Finland (1940–1944)
Esa Saarinen	(1953–)	Philosopher
Päivi Setälä	(1943–2014)	Historian and professor
Jean Sibelius	(1865–1957)	Composer
Juha Sihvola	(1957–2012)	Philosopher and historian
Frans Emil Sillanpää	(1888–1964)	Nobel Laureate (Literature, 1939)
Kaarlo Juho Ståhlberg	(1865–1952)	Former President of Finland (1919–1925)
Karl Fritiof Sundman	(1873–1949)	Astronomer
Pehr Evind Svinhufvud	(1861–1944)	Former Prime Minister of Finland (1930–1931) and President of Finland (1931–1937)
Teivo Teivainen	(1970–)	Professor of world politics
Jaana Toivari-Viitala	(1964–2017)	Chair of the Finnish Egyptology Society
Zacharias Topelius	(1818–1898)	Writer and historian
Linus Torvalds	(1969–)	Creator of Linux and Git, and the main developer of the Linux kernel
Artturi Ilmari Virtanen	(1895–1973)	Nobel Laureate (Chemistry, 1945)
Jussi V. Koivisto	(1965–)	Economist and educator
Edvard August Vainio	(1853–1929)	Lichenologist; student from 1870 to 1880; associate professor of botany 1880–1906
Bror-Erik Wallenius	(1943–)	Sports commentator
Mika Waltari	(1908–1979)	Novelist
Georg Henrik von Wright	(1916–2003)	Philosopher and president of the Academy of Finland
Erato Kozakou-Marcoullis	(1949–)	Minister of Foreign Affairs of Cyprus
Juha Hernesniemi	(1947–2023)	Neurosurgeon
Helvi Poutasuo	(1943–2017)	Teacher, translator, editor, politician
Eeva-Kaarina Aronen	(1948–2015)	Author, journalist
Pigga Keskitalo	(1972–)	Sámi politician and academic
Jaakko Suolahti	(1918–1987)	Classicists scholar and Professor in History
Derrick Rossi	(1966–)	Stem cell biologist and co-founder of Moderna
Klaus Suomela	(1888–1962)	Dramatic arts and gymnastics (Olympic gymnastics silver medallist 1912)
Laura Maria Harmaja	(1881–1954)	Economist
Jaana Bäck	(1961–)	Finnish plant ecologist and professor of forest-atmosphere interactions at the University of Helsinki
Lauri Carlson	(1952–)	Linguist
Hedvig Sohlberg	(1858–1937)	Educator, reformer, politician

== Chancellors ==
The chancellor is the highest representative of the University of Helsinki. He is elected by the college, the highest body of staff representation at the university. According to the University Act, the chancellor's task is to promote the sciences and monitor the interests of the university. The chancellor has the right to attend meetings of the Government of Finland on matters concerning the University of Helsinki.

Chancellors	
Edvard Hjelt	1917–1921
Anders Donner	1921–1926
Hugo Suolahti	1926–1944
Antti Tulenheimo	1944–1952
Pekka Myrberg	1952–1962
Edwin Linkomies	1962–1963
Paavo Ravila	1963–1968
Pentti Renvall	1968–1973
Mikko Juva	1973–1978
Ernst Palmén	1978–1983
Nils Oker-Blom	1983–1988
Olli Lehto	1988–1993
Lauri Saxén	1993–1996
Risto Ihamuotila	1996–2003
Kari Raivio	2003–2008
Ilkka Niiniluoto	2008–2013
Thomas Wilhelmsson	2013–2017
Kaarle Hämeri	2017–

== Rectors ==
Rectors	
Waldemar Ruin	1915–1920
Ivar August Heikel	1920–1922
Hugo Suolahti	1923–1926
Antti Tulenheimo	1926–1931
Robert Brotherus	1931–1938
Kaarlo Linkola	1938–1941
Rolf Nevanlinna	1941–1945
Arthur Långfors	1945–1950
Erik Lönnroth	1950–1953
Paavo Ravila	1953–1956
Edwin Linkomies	1956–1962
Erkki Kivinen	1962–1971
Mikko Juva	1971–1973
Ernst Palmén	1973–1978
Nils Oker-Blom	1978–1983
Olli Lehto	1983–1988
Päiviö Tommila	1988–1992
Risto Ihamuotila	1992–1996
Kari Raivio	1996–2003
Ilkka Niiniluoto	2003–2008
Thomas Wilhelmsson	2008–2013
Jukka Kola	2013–2018
Jari Niemelä	2018–2022
Sari Lindblom	2022–

== See also ==
- History of Finland
- Helsinki Senate Square
- List of universities in Finland
- Education in Finland
- Helsinki University of Technology
- Europaeum
- Bologna Process
