= List of Finnish philosophers =

This is a list of notable Finnish philosophers:

== A ==
- Elisa Aaltola
- Erik Ahlman
- Timo Airaksinen
- Lilli Alanen

== B ==
- Otto Brusiin

== E ==
- Hjalmar Magnus Eklund

== F ==
- Arvi Grotenfelt

== H ==
- Arto Haapala
- Pekka Himanen
- Jaakko Hintikka
- Matti Häyry

== K ==
- Eino Kaila
- Raili Kauppi
- S. Albert Kivinen
- Tarja Knuuttila

== L ==
- Gunnar Landtman
- Pentti Linkola

== M ==
- Uskali Mäki

== N ==
- Ilkka Niiniluoto

== P ==
- Paavo Pylkkänen
- Pauli Pylkkö

== R ==
- Yrjö Reenpää

== S ==
- Esa Saarinen
- Juha Sihvola
- Johan Vilhelm Snellman

== T ==
- Raimo Tuomela
- Jouko Turkka

== V ==
- Juha Varto

== W ==
- Thomas Wallgren
- Edvard Westermarck
- Georg Henrik von Wright
