= History of philosophy in Finland =

The history of Finnish philosophy ranges from the prehistoric period to contemporary philosophy.

Philosophy was the first academic subject in Finland as well as in the world. When the Royal Academy of Turku was founded in 1640, in addition to professors of law, medicine and three theology, six professors of the Faculty of Philosophical Sciences were appointed. Philosophy in the 21st century has all the external characteristics of academia in Finland: an established position as an academic subject, its own publications, scientific societies, congresses and international cooperation organisations.

The big names in Finnish philosophy have included J. V. Snellman, who represented G. W. F. Hegel's thinking in the 19th century and was influenced by German idealism, and has been regarded as Finland's national philosopher, as well as in the 20th century Edvard Westermarck, Eino Kaila, Georg Henrik von Wright and Jaakko Hintikka, who have attached Finnish philosophy above all to Anglo-Saxon, British and American philosophy.

== Prehistoric thought ==
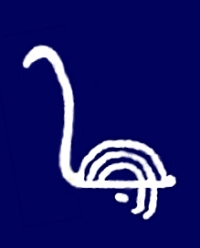
Swan and egg. Birds are related in many ways to the beliefs of Baltic Finns. For example, there were many notions of how the bird had created the world.

In the prehistoric period, thinking about Finnish existence and life was presented as different myths and folk poetry. Knowledge of the life and thinking of prehistoric Finland has only been preserved through folk poems written down later. In Kalevala, for example, descriptions of the legends and concepts of the time can be found, such as various explanations of the structure of the universe and its origins. Personal descriptions, on the other hand, can be used to deduce the moral and social perceptions of the times.

== Swedish period ==
=== Catholic Middle Ages ===
When the Catholic Church established itself in Finland in the 13th century, it also annexed the country to the European common culture of the Middle Age, which was achieved by the shared Catholic religion and the Latin language. At the same time, Finland was included in the philosophical system of the Catholic Church. It was dominated by scholastics, who combined ancient philosophy with the teachings of the Church. Scholastics particularly emphasised logic. Metaphysical doctrines were based on the ideas of Aristotle and the Church.

In the Middle Ages, both ecclesiastical and high administrative posts were required to study in philosophy as well. Studies in philosophy were a prerequisite especially for progress to theology studies. The common culture made it possible for Finns to go to European universities to study. However, studying was very expensive, and so students who left Finland abroad belonged to the upper class. They became bishops and priests for the service of the Catholic Church in Finland. The most popular destinations were Paris, Rostock and Leipzig.

It is known that in the Middle Ages at least 150 Finns completed degrees and lectured at universities across Europe. However, they have not retained the writings identified as their writings. There may have been considerably more students, as only students with degrees are often recorded in university books. Johannes Flicke is known to be the first Finn to complete a theological degree in Paris. Olavi Maununpoika is the most famous of the students in Europe.

=== Reformation ===
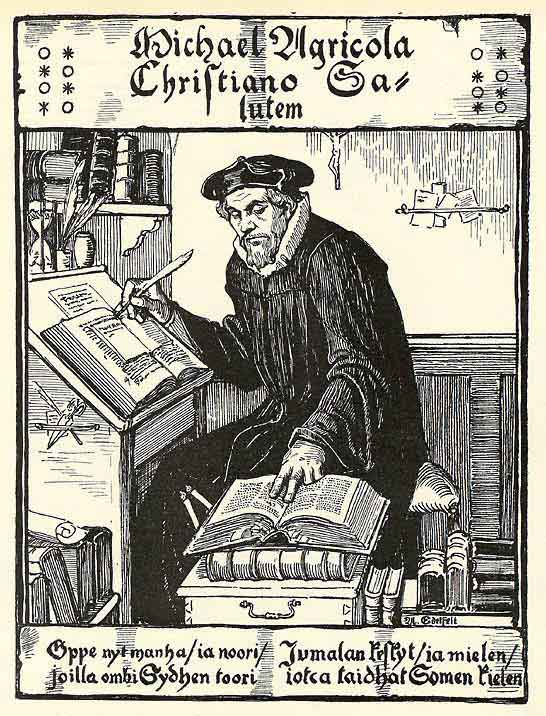
Mikael Agricola

After the reformation, Finns acquired training primarily in Germany, where the University of Wittenberg became the centre of Protestant theology.

Notable Finnish theologists of the era included:

- Mikael Agricola (1510–1557)
- Ericus Erici (1550s–1625)
- Henricus Martini Fattbur (or Fatebur)
- Sigfridus Aronus Forsius (1550s–1624)
- Johannes Canuti Forthelius
- Marcus Henrici Helsingius (1555–1609)
- Nicolaus Magni
- Johannes Clementis Mentzius
- Johannes Svenonis Raumannus
- Pietari Särkilahti

=== 17th century ===
Turku Royal Academy was founded in 1640. At the beginning, the Academy's Faculty of Philosophical Sciences had four professorships: 1) ethics, political doctrine, and history; (2) logic and poetry; 3) mathematics; and 4) rhetoric. The first two included the study and teaching of philosophy and can be considered to correspond to the current fields of practical and theoretical philosophy.

The philosophy practiced at the Turku Academy was for a long time a very conservative so-called neo-scholastic philosophy. Influencers of the era included:

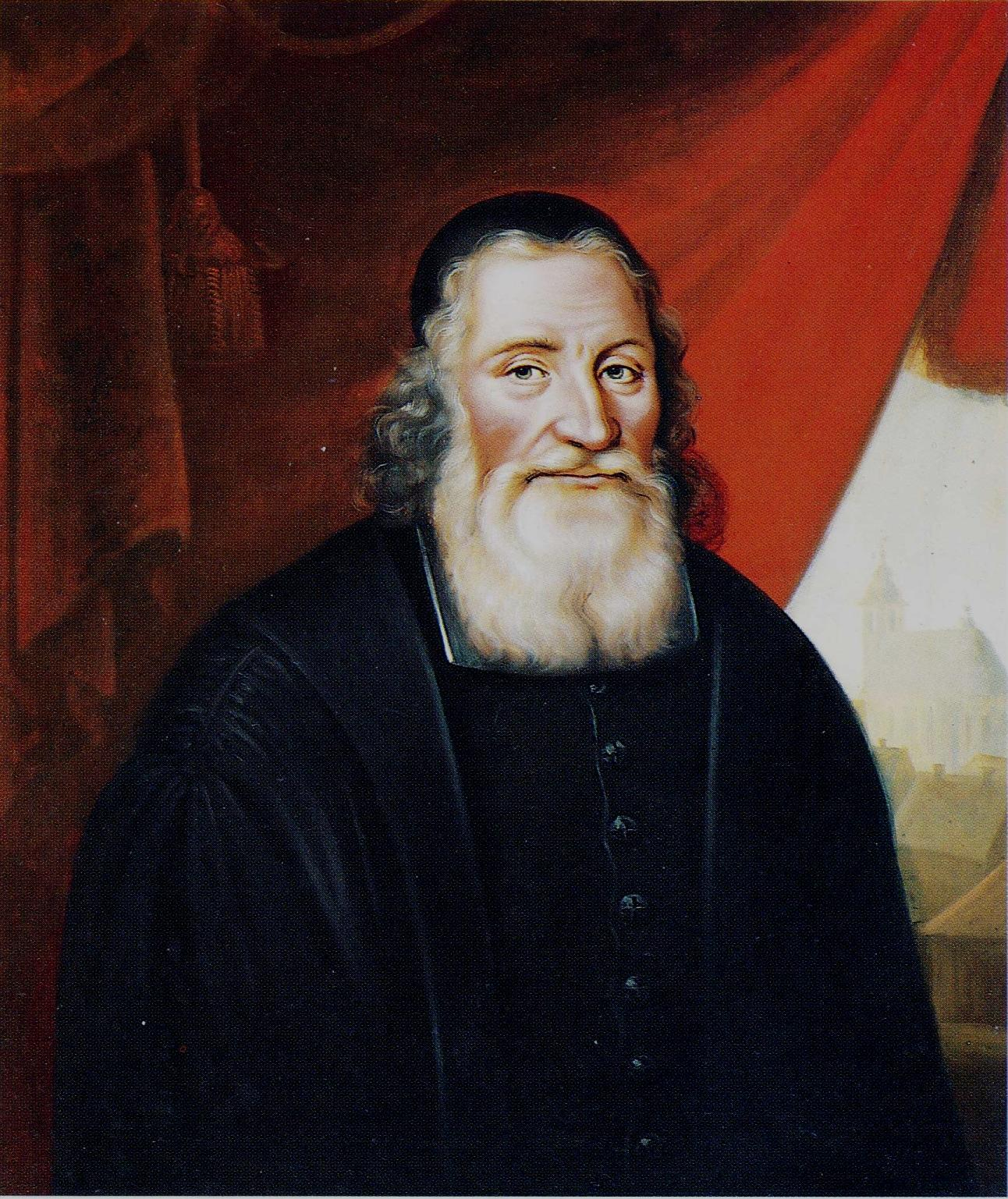
Johan Gezelius the elder

- Nicolaus Laurentii Nycopensis (–1664)
- Andreas Thuronius (1632–1665)
- Mikael Wexionius (1609–1680)
- Johan Wassenius (1620/22–1691)
- Georg Alanus (1609–1664)
- Abraham Thauvonius (1622–1679)
- Martin Stodius (1590–1675)
- Enevald Svenonius (1617–1688)
- Johan Gezelius the elder
- Jakob Flachsenius (1633–1694)
- Simon Tålpo (1652–1711)
- Johannes Rungius (1666–1704)
- Gabriel Juslenius (1666–1724)
- Axel Kempe (1623–1682)
- Samuel Gyldenstolpe (1650–1692)
- Anders Wanochius (1651–1700)
- Petrus Laurbecchius (1628–1705)
- Martin Miltopaeus (1631–1679)
- Daniel Achrelius
- Johan Gezelius the younger
- Lars Tammelin

=== 18th and 19th centuries ===
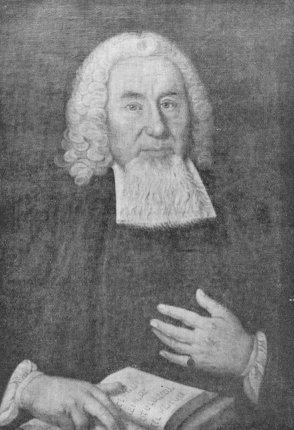
Daniel Juslenius

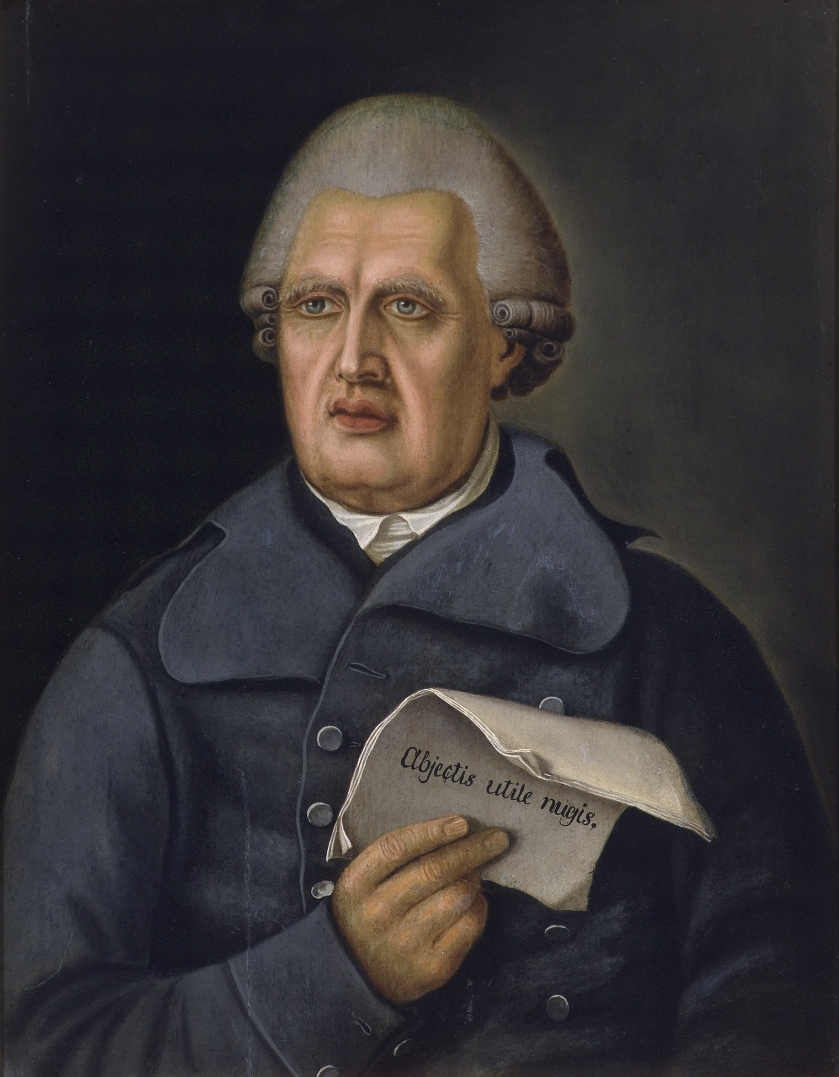
Henrik Gabriel Porthan

In the 18th and 19th centuries, the Academy of Turku was influenced by, among others:

- Daniel Juslenius (1676–1752)
- Johan Bernhard Munster (1694–1714)
- Johan Hartman (1682–1737)
- Johan Wallenius (1698–1746)
- Johan Welin (1705–1744)
- Gabriel Heinricus
- Karl Mesterton (1715–1773)
- Jakob Haartman (1717–1788)
- Wilhelm Robert Nääf (1720–1783)
- Olof Schalberg (1733–1804)
- Nils Hasselbom (1690–1764)
- Henrik Hassel (1700–1776)
- Karl Fredrik Mennander (1712–1786)
- Henrik Gabriel Porthan (1739–1804)
- Jakob Tengström (1755–1832)
- Johan Arelin
- Henrik Alanus
- Johan Jakob Lagerström
- Samuel Castrén
- Algot Scarin (1684–1771)
- Johan Bilmark (1728–1801)
- Erik Johan Frosterus
- Nils Magnus Tolpo
- Gustaf Gadolin
- Johan Bonsdorff
- Gabriel Palander (1774–1821)
- Anders Johan Lagus (1775–1831)
- Fredrik Bergbom (1785–1830)
- Gabriel Israel Hartman (1776–1809)

Outside the Academy, the influences included:

- Adolf Ivar Arwidsson (1751–1858)
- Anders Chydenius (1729–1783)
- Petter Forsskål (1732–1763)
- Franz Mikael Franzén (1772–1847)

== Russian period ==
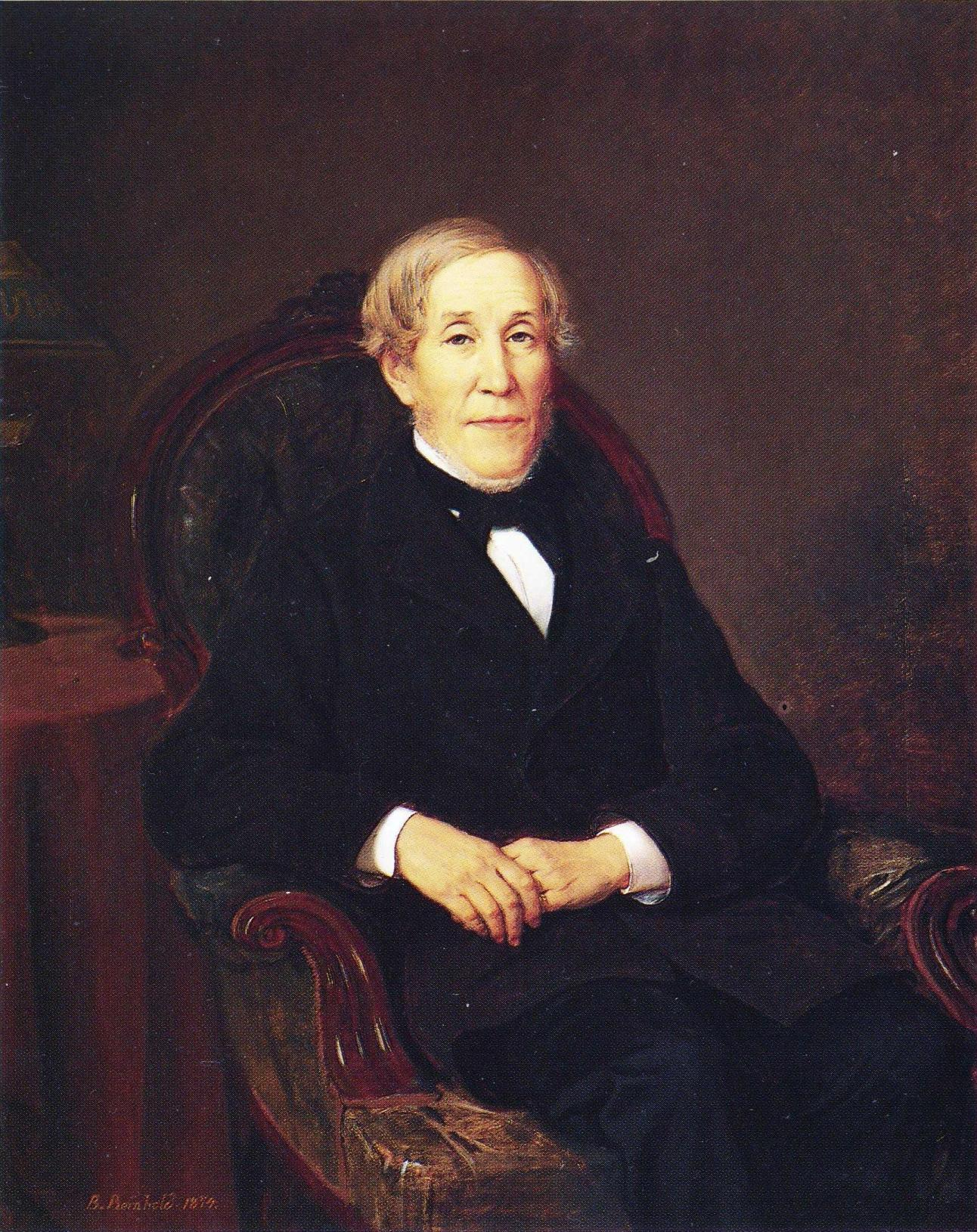
Bernhard Reinhold, J. V. Snellman, 1874

After the fire of Turku, the Turku Academy moved to Helsinki. 19th-century Finnish philosophy was dominated by Hegeleanism. After J. V. Snellman, the professor of philosophy was Thiodolf Rein, who founded the Finnish Philosophical Association in 1873. He was succeeded in 1905 by Arvi Grotenfelt, a Neo-Kantian. In 1906, the chair was divided (again) into theoretical and applied philosophy.

The most prominent philosopher at the turn of the century was the moralist and social anthropologist Edvard Westermarck, who became professor of applied philosophy from 1906 and was also a professor at the London School of Economics from 1907 to 1930.

Hegelian philosophers included:

- Germund Fredrik Aminoff (1796–1876)
- Johan Henrik Avellan (1773–1832)
- Axel Adolf Laurell (1801–1852)
- Karl Sederholm (1789–1867)
- Johan Vilhelm Snellman (1806–1881)
- Johann Mathias Sundvall (1793–1843)
- Johan Jakob Tengström (1787–1858)

Other schools of thought were represented by:

- Wilhelm Bolin (1835–1924)
- Israel Hwasser (1790–1860)
- Arvi Grotenfelt (1863–1941)
- Carl Robert Sederholm (1818–1903)
- Edvard Westermarck (1862–1939)
- Yrjö Hirn (1870–1952)

== Independent period ==
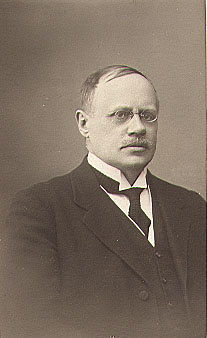
Edvard Westermarck

=== 20th century ===
Edvard Westermarck has influenced Finnish philosophy above all with his studies on the emergence and development of morality. At the turn of the 19th and 20th centuries, three Westermarck students were particularly important in Finnish philosophy:

- Rafael Karsten (1879–1956)
- Rolf Lagerborg (1874–1959)
- Gunnar Landtman (1878–1940)

The first prominent professional philosophers of the independence period were:

- Erik Ahlman (1892–1952)
- Eino Kaila (1890–1958)
- J. E. Salomaa (1891–1960)

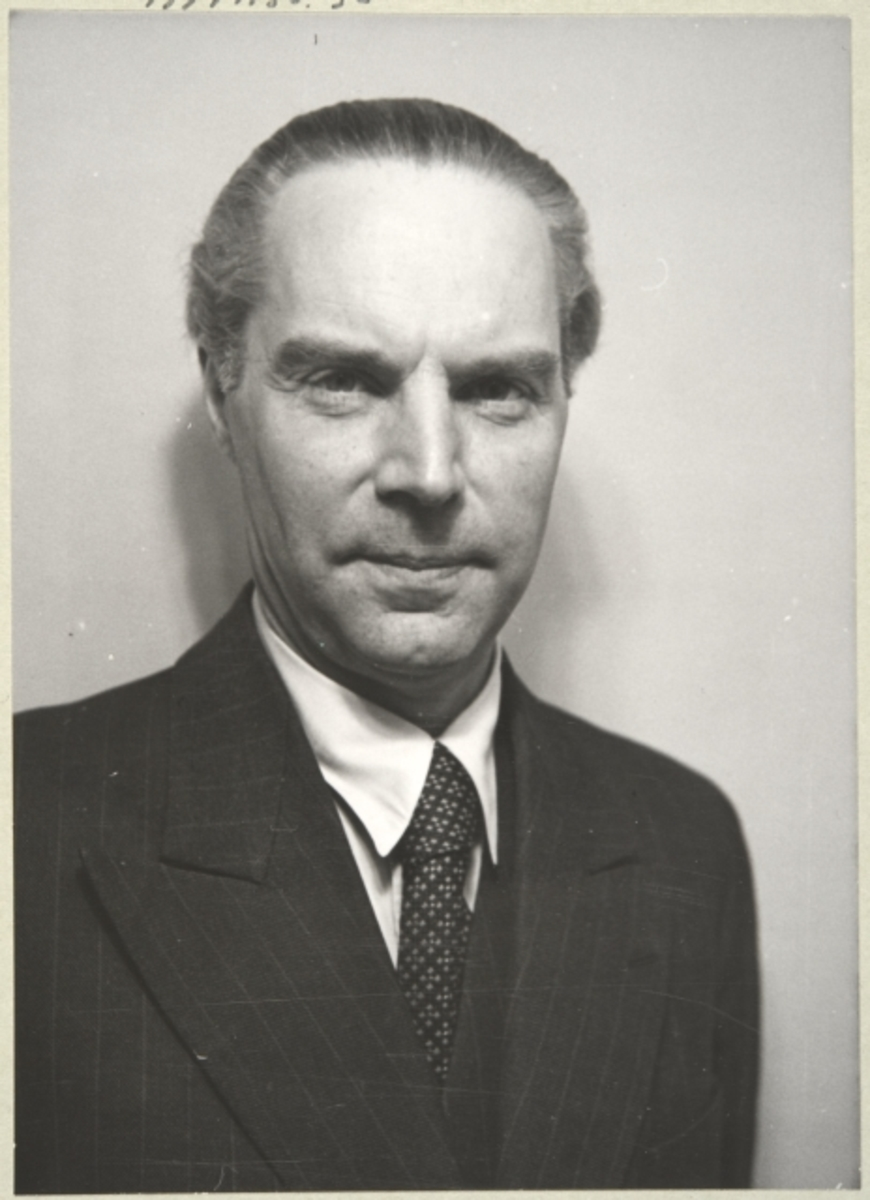
Eino Kaila

The biggest influence of these has been by Eino Kaila, who was in contact with the Vienna circle and logic and philosophy of science to Finland and thus brought Finnish philosophy into the context of logical positivism. He was professor of philosophy at the University of Turku from 1921 to 1930, professor of theoretical philosophy at the University of Helsinki from 1930 to 1948 and a member of the Academy of Finland from 1948 until his death in 1958. Kaila's impact on the development of Finnish intellectual life was decisive. More strongly than any other private person, Kaila connected Finnish philosophy to the European tradition by establishing connections with the Vienna circle. Thus, he "brought to Finland" modern logic and the scientific conception of reality highlighted by empirics.

Kaila can be considered to have founded the tradition of Finnish analytical philosophy. Early analytical philosophy, represented by Bertrand Russell and G. E. Moore, was very critical of the tradition of German-origin, Hegelian-oriented idealism, which also had its Finnish representatives. J. E. Salomaa's works on the history of philosophy show the influence of German idealism, and Erik Ahlman's work also has an idealistic emphasis. Ahven's student Sven Krohn maintained the tradition of idealistic philosophy. Reijo Wilenius has represented a parallel, idealistically tuned thinking extended to anthroposophy. Wilenius' students, like Kari E. Turunen, who has published numerous popular works, have meanwhile been excluded from the Finnish philosophical community.

Kaila's students and sphere of influence included:

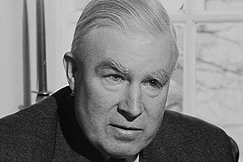
Georg Henrik von Wright

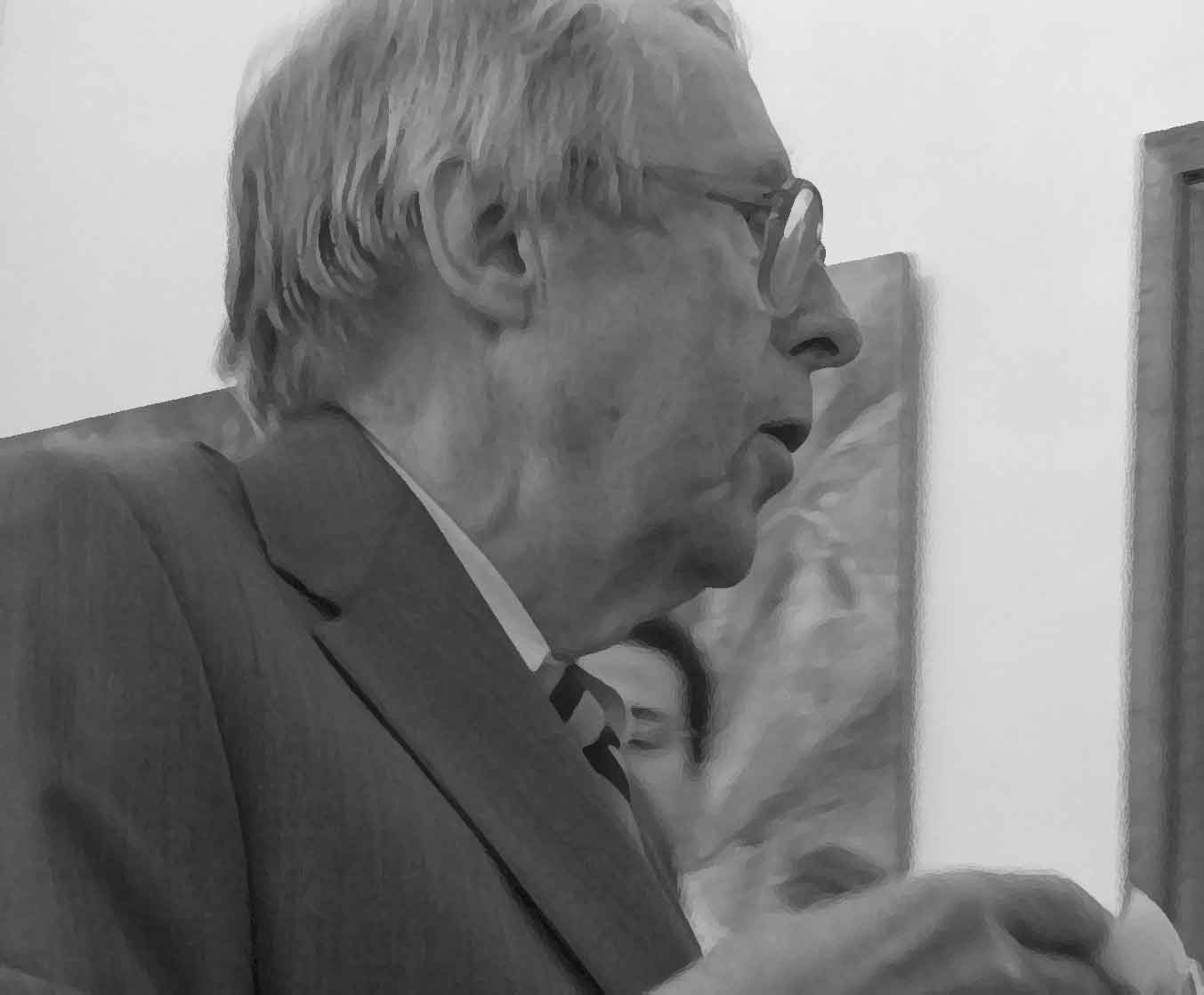
Jaakko Hintikka

- Oiva Ketonen (1913–2000)
- Erik Stenius (1911–1990)
- Georg Henrik von Wright (1913–2003)

Phenomenology has been represented by:

- Eino Krohn (1902–1987)
- Sven Krohn (1903–1999)
- Yrjö Reenpää (1894–1976)
- Martti Siirala (1922–2008)

Other philosophical actors included:

- Urpo Harva (1910–1994)
- F. J. Kantola (–1940)
- Yrjö Kallinen (1886–1976)
- Raili Kauppi (1920–1995)
- Hannu Taanila (1939–2024)
- Jussi Tenkku (1917–2005)
- Reijo Wilenius (1930–2019)

=== Finnish contemporary philosophy ===
Finnish philosophy has been respected in the world, and several Finnish philosophers have held positions of trust in international organizations in the field of philosophy.

Finnish philosophy in the second half of the 20th century has been dominated by logical-analytical philosophy. Research has focused primarily on logic, the theory of inductive knowledge, and the problems of scientific explanation and theory formation. Finnish philosophers have been well acquainted with the philosophical and theological discourse of analytical philosophy, in which the tools of logic are often applied in specifying and solving philosophical problems.

Jaakko Hintika has played a very central role in Finnish contemporary philosophy on the one hand through his students and on the other hand through the research topics he has opened. Hintikka started as a student of von Wright, and established an analytical school focused on logic as Finland's leading philosophical trend. Hintikka herself has studied especially the semantics of possible worlds, the logic of questioning and game theory. He currently serves as a professor at Boston University.

Finnish continental philosophy has continued above all the phenomenological traditions of J. E. Salomaa, Erik Ahlman and Sven and Eino Krohn. Among other things, Esa Saarinen has practiced existentialism.

Since the 1980s, there has been talk of "post-analytical" thinking. Related to this is also a rise in pragmatism in Finland. The philosophical magazine Niin & näin, which began publishing in 1994, has published articles, especially on continental philosophy. Another Finnish philosophical periodical, Königsberg, was founded in Tampere in 1996.

Especially in the 1990s, a few Finnish philosophers became active public figures. Philosophy came back as a compulsory subject in high schools. Open university philosophy courses were more popular than ever in the late 1990s.

==== Professors of philosophy ====
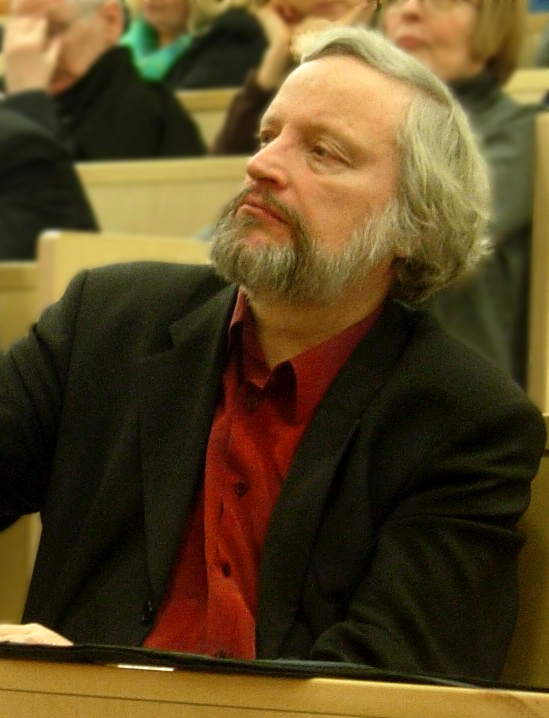
Ilkka Niiniluoto

Current professors:

- Sara Heinämaa (1960–), Professor of Philosophy, University of Jyväskylä
- Antti Kauppinen (1972–), Professor of Practical Philosophy, University of Helsinki
- Olli Koistinen (1956–), Professor of Theoretical Philosophy, University of Turku
- Jaakko Kuorikoski (1977–), Practical Philosophy Professor (tenure-track), University of Helsinki
- Maria Lasonen-Aarnio (1979–), Professor of Theoretical Philosophy (tenure-track), University of Helsinki
- Eerik Lagerspetz (1956–), Professor of Practical Philosophy, University of Turku
- Arto Laitinen (1969–), Professor of Philosophy, University of Tampere
- Sami Pihlström (1969–), Professor of Philosophy of Religion, University of Helsinki
- Juha Räikkä (1965–), Professor of Practical Philosophy, University of Turku
- José Filipe Pereira da Silva (1975–), Professor of Theoretical Philosophy, University of Helsinki
- Gabriel Sandu (1954–), Professor of Theoretical Philosophy, University of Helsinki
- Thomas Wallgren (1958–), Professor of Swedish Philosophy (Philosopher), Helsinki University of Helsinki
- Mikko Yrjönsuuri, Professor of Theoretical Philosophy, University of Jyväskylä

Abroad:

- Lilli Alanen (1941–2021)
- Risto Hilpinen (1943–), University of Miami; former Professor of Theoretical Philosophy, University of Turku
- Tarja Knuuttila, Professor of Philosophy, University of Vienna
- Mari Mikkola, Professor of Philosophy, University of Oxford
- Martin Kusch (1959–), Professor of Philosophy, University of Vienna
- Pauliina Remes, Professor of Philosophy, Uppsala University
- Susanna Lindberg (1966-), Professor of Continental Philosophy, Leiden University
- Pekka Väyrynen (1974–), Professor of Philosophy, University of Leeds
- Heikki Ikäheimo, Associate Professor, UNSW Sydney

==== Other researchers in philosophy ====
- Juha Himanka
- Leena Kakkori
- Heikki Kannisto
- Toni Kannisto
- S. Albert Kivinen (1933–2021)
- Petter Korkman
- Jussi Kotkavirta
- Markus Lammenranta
- Olli Loukola
- Lauri Mehtonen
- Olli-Pekka Moisio
- Pentti Määttänen
- Ilkka Patoluoto
- Tapio Puolimatka
- Panu Raatikainen
- Martina Reuter
- Juha Sihvola
- Hannu Sivenius
- Juha Varto

==== Other philosophical thinkers ====
- Torsti Lehtinen
- Heidi Liehu
- Pentti Linkola
- Tuomas Nevanlinna
- Aapo Riihimäki

== Bibliography ==
- Follesdal, Dagfinn: Scandinavia, philosophy in. Teoksessa Craig, Edward (ed.): The Routledge Encyclopedia of Philosophy. London: Routledge, 1998. ISBN 0-415-07310-3.
- Hintikka, Jaakko: Finnish philosophy. In Honderich, Ted (ed.): The Oxford Companion to Philosophy. New edition. New York: Oxford University Press, 2005. ISBN 0-19-926479-1.
- Lehtinen, Anja Inkeri: Suomen keskiajan filosofian lähteistä. In Knuuttila, Simo; Manninen, Juha; Niiniluoto, Ilkka, eds. (1979). Aate ja maailmankuva. Suomen filosofista perintöä keskiajalta vuosisadallemme. Helsinki: WSOY. ISBN 951-0-08827-7.
- Niiniluoto, Ilkka: Filosofia Suomessa. Teoksessa Nordin, Svante (1999). Filosofian historia. Länsimaisen järjen seikkailut Thaleesta postmodernismiin. Oulu: Pohjoinen. ISBN 951-749-292-8.
- Pihlström, Sami (2001). Filosofin käytännöt. Pragmatismin perinteen vaikutus suomalaisessa filosofiassa 1900-luvulla. Helsinki: Unipress. ISBN 951-579-129-4.
- von Wright, Georg Henrik: Katsaus filosofian tilaan Suomessa. In Niiniluoto, Ilkka; Saarinen, Esa, eds. (1986). Vuosisatamme filosofia. Helsinki: WSOY. ISBN 951-0-12166-5.
