= Janhunen =

Janhunen is a Finnish surname. Notable people with the surname include:

- Juha Janhunen (born 1952), Finnish linguist
- Pekka Janhunen, Finnish space physicist, astrobiologist, and inventor
- Matti Janhunen, Finnish politician, minister in Pekkala Cabinet and Paasikivi III Cabinet

== See also ==
- Janhonen
