= Janhonen =

Janhonen is a Finnish surname. Notable people with the surname include:

- Pauli Janhonen (1914–2007), Finnish sport shooter
- Toivo Janhonen (1886–1939), Finnish politician, minister in Kallio IV Cabinet
- Hilja Haapala (born Janhonen; 1877–1858), Finnish writer

== See also ==
- Janhunen
