= Timo Airaksinen =

Finnish academic (born 1947)

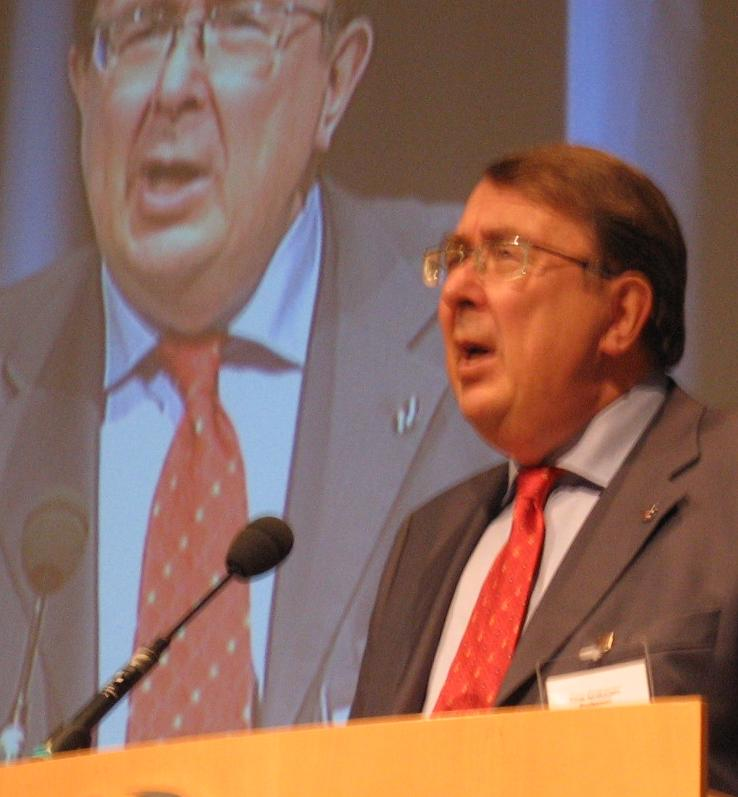
- Born: 25 April 1947 (age 77); Vaasa, Finland
- Era: 20th & 21st century
- Region: Western philosophy
- Main interests: Ethics, Modern philosophy, Social philosophy

Timo Airaksinen (born 25 April 1947 in Vaasa, Finland) is Professor of Moral Philosophy in the Discipline of Social and Moral Philosophy at Helsinki University. By longstanding tradition in the University of Helsinki, the philosophy faculty is divided into two major areas, the practical and the theoretical. He graduated from the University of Turku in 1971 and defended his doctoral dissertation The Hegelianism of Bradley and McTaggart in 1975. He specializes in ethics and social philosophy, ethics of technology, the history of philosophy, and education. He has written on a wide range of topics dealing with these issues, from the thinking of Hobbes to Marquis de Sade. Airaksinen also regularly contributes to public debate in Finland and has had a column in the newspaper Helsingin Sanomat.

Timo Airaksinen is a member of the editorial boards of the leading Finnish philosophical journal Acta Philosophica Fennica and of the yearbook Berkeley Studies. Also he was the vice-president of the International Berkeley Society.

== Selection of Airaksinen's works in English ==
- Ethics of coercion and authority. A philosophical study of social life, 1988 ISBN 0-8229-3583-X.
- Of glamor, Sex and De Sade, 1991 ISBN 0-89341-591-X.
- The Philosophy of the Marquis de Sade, 1995 ISBN 0-415-11229-X.
- The Philosophy of H. P. Lovecraft. The route to horror, 1999 ISBN 0-8204-4022-1.
- "Hobbes on the passions and powerlessness", Hobbes Studies, 6/1993, pp. 80–104.
- "Service and Science in Professional Life", Ethics and the Professions, 1994, pp. 1–13
