= Haapala =

Haapala may refer to:

- Haapala (surname), a Finnish surname
- Aliyah Bet, also known as Ha'apala, the immigration of Jews to Israel
