= Loreta Anilionytė =

Lithuanian philosopher, writer and translator (born 1963)

Loreta Anilionytė (born in Kaunas) is a Lithuanian philosopher, writer and translator. She is an associate Professor of Ethics and Philosophy of the Lithuanian University of Educology and a Ph.D. of Lithuanian Culture Research Institute (formerly of Philosophy, Sociology and Law Institute). She graduated from Vilnius University, Lithuanian language and literature. In 1991 she received her Ph.D. in history of German philosophy and ethics ("The Problem of Values in Kant and Scheler ethics"). There are many published works including scientific articles and books, a novel, and essays, in her bibliography.

Anilionytė is the author of a highly controversial novel about the relationship between high culture and popular culture O kas po to? (And what then?). The novel is characterized by a mix of eroticism, philosophical ponderings on the human condition and psychological insight, social criticism and cold descriptions of moral failures. The prototype of this novel is a famous Lithuanian pop singer, Edmundas Kučinskas. Anilionytė is outstanding among other Lithuanian writers for her ironic, provocative writing style. She has been awarded some important literature prizes. She received the 2006 Cosmopolitan magazine "Discovery of the Year" award for the novel.

She has translated many works by well-known German philosophers into Lithuanian. She was awarded the Franz Dovydaitis Prize in 2005.

== Bibliography ==
=== Monograph ===
Naujųjų amžių etikos profiliai. – Vilnius: VPU leidykla, 2011, 228p. ISBN 978-9955-20-639-2

=== Novel ===
O kas po to?, Vilnius, Alma littera, 2006 m., 422 p. ISBN 9955-24-014-8

=== Major articles ===
- "Blogio profiliai etikoje", Logos, No. 25
- "A. Schopenhauerio etika: pesimizmas ar gyvenimiškas realizmas?", Logos. No. 27
- "Vertybinio absoliutizmo dilemos ir deontologinė etika", Logos, No. 28
- "Žmogus – kenčianti būtybė (Keletas kentėjimo problemos recepcijų Vakarų filosofijoje)", Logos. 2000. No. 23
- "Antikinis kinizmas – gyvenimo būdas ar filosofija?", Logos, 2001, No. 24
- "Vertybių problema I. Kanto etikoje", Problemos, V. 1992. No. 44.
- "Fanatizmas// Neprievarta ir tolerancija kintančioje Rytų ir Vakarų Europoje". Pranešimai ir tezės. V. 1995.
- "Hegelio etika: dorovė prieš moralę", Logos, No. 38-41
- "Laisvės samprata I. Kanto etikoje // MA darbai. Filosofija. V. 1999.
- "E. Husserlio fenomenologijos modifikacijos M. Schelerio aksiologijoje". Logos, No. 26
- "Minervos pelėdos skrydis" Įžanginis str. G.Hegelio "Teisės filosofijos apmatams" G. F.Hegel. Teisės filosofijos apmatai. V. Mintis. 2000
- "Ressentimento samprata M. Schelerio filosofijoje". Logos, Nr. 43//Logos, 2008, No. 51
- "Kanto etikos monologinis formalizmas". Logos, No. 46, 2006.
- "V. Sezemano gnoseologijos linkmės//Vosylius Sezemanas". Loginiai ir gnoseologiniai tyrinėjimai. V.: Lietuvos kultūros tyrimų institutas, 2011.

=== Teaching materials ===
- Egoistinė žmogaus prigimtis naujųjų amžių etikoje, Vilnius, 2010. – 68 p.
- Etika ir asmenybė Maxo Schelerio vertybiniame absoliutizme, Vilnius, 2010. – 84 p.
