= Haapala (surname) =

Haapala is a Finnish surname. Notable people with the surname include:

- Arto Haapala (born 1959), Finnish philosopher
- Eero Haapala (born 1989), Finnish long jumper
- Henrik Haapala (born 1994), Finnish professional ice hockey forward
- Hilja Haapala (1877–1958), Finnish writer
- Tuomas Haapala (born 1979), Finnish footballer
