= Juha Varto =

Finnish philosopher

Juha Varto (born 27 June 1949) is a Finnish philosopher, considered the most important phenomenologist in Finland, known also for his prolific output on a variety of philosophical themes. Since 1999 he has been professor of research in visual art and education at the Aalto University School of Art and Design, Helsinki. Before that he taught research methodology and acted as director of research in various Finnish universities and polytechnics (1992–1999) and before that taught philosophy at the University of Tampere (1973–1993). During the 1990s Varto produced over 100 programmes for Finnish radio and television, mainly dealing with philosophical questions. He has been awarded an honorary doctorate for theatre and drama by the Theatre Academy Helsinki. Autumn 2016, the president of Aalto University, Tuula Teeri, appointed Varto an Aalto Distinguished Professor in recognition of his significant scientific merits.

July 2017, Varto retired from Aalto University.

== Career ==
Varto’s early philosophical interest was in the history of logic; his mentor, professor Raili Kauppi was an internationally known Leibniz scholar and writer in intentional logic. Varto’s doctoral thesis dealt with the subject of 12th century logic. Later he wrote on questions that touch upon the relationship between formal and philosophical in logic. Varto’s main corpus of writing is in Finnish, since during his early career there were only few texts in Finnish in philosophy and even less on phenomenology. His pedagogical interest was in elaborating Plato’s texts as a starting point in philosophy. But he has also dealt with texts on Edmund Husserl, Martin Heidegger, Scheler, Adolf Reinach, Edith Stein, Maurice Merleau-Ponty, Emmanuel Levinas and Michel Henry. He has also studied the writings of Simone Weil and her approach to issues important to every day life. In recent years Varto has published extensive texts on aesthetics and artistic thinking and the methodology of artistic research.

== The Tampere School of Phenomenology ==
The so-called ”Tampere School of Phenomenology” emerged around Varto’s scholarship activities in the 1980s. This group included both philosophers and scholars of other areas, such as politics and sociology. Today, many of his former students from that period hold leading positions in Finnish universities, as well as governmental institutions and private enterprises. The group identified itself as the ”Finnish Phenomenological Institute”, but after Varto moved to Helsinki it became known as the ”Society of European Philosophy”. The Institute published 44 volumes of scholarship in phenomenology, ranging from doctoral theses to monographs on individual intellectuals and translations of works by foreign intellectuals. Like Varto himself, the Institute and later the Society has been active in civil and public discussions on issues that previously lacked any intellectual approach. Notably, in 1993 they founded the philosophical journal ”niin&näin”, which became a known discussion forum, not tied to any particular school.

== Books by Varto in English and German ==
- Formal and Philosophical in Early Medieval Logic (1989, ISBN 951-44-2419-0)
- Formalontologische Relationen der Sprache (1990, ISBN 951-44-2654-1)
- The Art and Craft of Beauty (2008, ISBN 951-558-280-6)
- Basics of Artistic Research (2009, ISBN 951-558-303-9)
- Song of the Earth (2011, ISBN 978-952-60-4120-9 )
- A Dance with the World. Towards an Ontology of Singularity (2012, ISBN 978-952-60-4656-3)
- Otherwise than knowing. (2013, ISBN 978-952-60-5182-6)
- The Sins of the Fathers. (2015, ISBN 978-952-60-6075-0)
- Artistic Research. What is it? Who does it? Why? (2018, ISBN 978-952-60-7967-7)

== Books by Varto in Finnish ==
- Nuoruuden viisaus ja muita kirjeitä peruskysymyksestä (The Wisdom of Youth) (1991).
- Laulu maasta: Luennot etiikasta (Lectures in Ethics) (1991)
- Myytti ja metodi: Johdatusta filosofian menetelmiin (Myth and Method) 1992
- Kannettava filosofinen sanakirja (The Portable Philosophical Dictionary) (1992)
- Fenomenologinen tieteen kritiikki (A Phenomenological Critique of Science) (1992)
- Tästä jonnekin muualle: Polkuja Heideggerista (From here to somewhere else: Paths from Heidegger) (1993)
- (with Liisa Veenkivi) Näkyvä ja näkymätön (Philosophical Discussions) (1993)
- Merkintöjä Platonista ja Platonin filosofiasta (Remarks on Plato) (1993)
- Laadullisen tutkimuksen metodologia (Methodology of Qualitative Research) (1992)
- Filosofian taito 1 (The Art of Philosophy I) (1994)
- Filosofian taito 2–3 (The Art of Philosophy II-III) (1995)
- (With Liisa Veenkivi,) Ihmisen tie: Keskusteluja mystikoista (Man's way I: A Discussion on Mystics) (1995)
- Lihan viisaus: Kirjoituksia halusta, katseesta ja puheesta (The Wisdom of the Flesh) 1996
- (With Liisa Veenkivi) Filosofia ja kaunokirjallisuus (Philosophy and Literature) 1996
- (With Liisa Veenkivi) Ihmisen tie 2: ”Kolmas maailma” (Man's way II: The Third World) (1997)
- (With Liisa Veenkivi) Rakkaus ja rukous (Love and Prayer) (1998)
- Uutta tietoa: Värityskirja tieteen filosofiaan (New Knowledge) (2000)
- Kauneuden taito: Estetiikkaa taidekasvattajille (Aesthetics for Art Educators) (2001)
- Isien synnit: Kasvatuksen kulttuurinen ja biologinen ongelma (The Sins of Fathers) (2002)
- Mitä Simone Weil on minulle opettanut (What Simone Weil taught me) (2005)
- (With Hakim Attar) Syvä laulu (Flamenco Deep Song) (2006)
- Ventura Pons (2007)
- Elämän kuvia: Elokuva, elämismaailma ja moraali (Images of Life. Cinema and Morality) 2008.
- Kymmenes muusa (The Tenth Muse. Cinema and Literature) (2007)
- Ajattelemisen alku ja loppu: Kreikkalaista eetosta etsimässä (The beginning and end of thinking: Search for Greek Ethos) (2008)
- Tanssi maailman kanssa. Yksittäisen ontologia. (Dance with the World. The Ontology of Singularity) (2008).
- Taiteellinen tutkimus. Mitä se on? Kuka sitä tekee? Miksi? (Artistic Research. What is it? Who does it? Why?) (2017)
