= International Berkeley Society =

US-American organization

- Established: 1975
- Mission: The study of George Berkeley's thought
- President: Nancy Kendrick
- Key people: Stephen Daniel, Tom Stoneham
- Website: http://internationalberkeleysociety.org/

The International Berkeley Society (IBS) is a US-based organization that is aimed at promoting interest in the life and work of the philosopher Bishop George Berkeley. Its president is currently Nancy Kendrick.

== Members and activities ==
The society was established in 1975 and now has members all over the world, among them Colin Murray Turbayne (United States), Wolfgang Breidert (Germany), Katia Saporiti (University of Zurich, Switzerland), Geneviève Brykman (France, a former vice-president), James William Harold Hill (the Czech Republic), Miłowit Kuniński (Poland), Timo Airaksinen (Helsinki University, Finland, vice-president from 2006 to 2013), Roomet Jakapi (Estonia). Members pay a nominal annual fee and receive the Berkeley Briefs, an annual publication that includes news items and other announcements of interest to the Society and its members. The journal Berkeley Studies is published by Hampden-Sydney College on behalf of the society. The IBS conducts a variety of activities, e.g. runs conferences.

== Turbayne Essay Prize ==
The IBS annually awards the Turbayne Prize to a member of the society who has written the best essay on an aspect of Berkeley's philosophy. Recipients of the award include:

- 1990, Phillip D. Cummins, University of Iowa
- 1991, Robert G. Muehlmann, University of Western Ontario
- 1992, Lisa Downing, University of Illinois at Chicago
- 1993, George Pappas, Ohio State University
  - Alan Hausman, Hunter College, CUNY
  - David Hausman, Dedman College
- 1995, Stephen Harris, College of William & Mary
- 1999, Margaret Atherton, University of Wisconsin, Milwaukee
- 2001, John Carriero, University of California at Los Angeles
  - Todd Ryan, Trinity College
- 2003, Michael Collins Allers, University ofMichigan y
- 2005, Laurence Carlin, University of Wisconsin, Oshkosh
- 2007, Jeffrey McDonough, Harvard University
- 2009, Sukjae Lee, Ohio State University
- 2011, Stefan Storrie, Trinity College Dublin
- 2013, Thomas Curtin, Trinity College Dublin
- 2015, Nancy Kendrick, Wheaton College, Massachusetts
