= Henry Veatch =

American philosopher (1911–1999)

Henry B. Veatch
- Born: Henry Babcock Veatch, Jr. September 26, 1911; Evansville, Indiana
- Died: July 9, 1999 (aged 87); Bloomington, Indiana
- Occupation: professor
- Known for: neo-Aristotelian philosopher

Academic background
- Education: Phillips Exeter Academy; Harvard University; A.B. (1923); M.A. (1933); Ph.D. (1937); Heidelberg University

Academic work
- Discipline: philosophy
- Sub-discipline: intellectualism
- Institutions: Indiana University; Northwestern University; Georgetown University
- Notable works: Rational Man: A Modern Interpretation of Aristotelian Ethics (1962)

Henry Babcock Veatch Jr. (September 26, 1911 – July 9, 1999) was an American philosopher, known as one of the "leading neo-Aristotelian philosophers of the twentieth century".

== Life and career ==
Henry Babcock Veatch Jr. was born on September 26, 1911, in Evansville, Indiana. He attended Phillips Exeter Academy in Exeter, New Hampshire. He then attended Harvard University, where he received his A.B. (summa cum laude) (1932), M.A. degree (1933), and a Ph.D. (1937). Following his Ph.D. he pursued post-doctoral studies at Heidelberg University in Germany, where he studied with Alfred North Whitehead, Karl Jaspers, Henry M. Sheffer, C. I. Lewis, R. B. Perry, and A. O. Lovejoy.

Veatch came to the Philosophy Department at Indiana University (IU) as an instructor in 1937. He was named assistant professor in 1941 and full professor in 1952. While at Indiana University, Veatch received many awards and honors. In 1954, he became the first recipient of the Frederick Bachman Lieber Award for Distinguished Teaching. He was popular with his students and was awarded the Sigma Delta Chi "Brown Derby" Award for most popular professor. In 1961, Veatch was named Distinguished Service Professor.

In 1965, Veatch left IU for Northwestern University where he remained until 1973. He then went to Georgetown University, where he was philosophy department chair from 1973 to 1976. Veatch also had visiting professorships at Colby College, Haverford College and St. Thomas University. In 1983, he retired as a distinguished professor and returned to Bloomington.

Veatch was active in the Episcopal Church and served as president of the American Catholic Philosophical Association. He served as president of the Metaphysical Society of America in 1961. In 1970–71 he served as president of the Western Division of the American Philosophical Association. He was a member of the Guild of Scholars of The Episcopal Church.

Henry Veatch died on July 9, 1999, in Bloomington, Indiana. His death was within eight hours of his wife of sixty years, Mary Jane Wilson Veatch. He was survived by two daughters and two grandsons.

Indiana University maintains the archive of his collected papers (1941–1997).

== Philosophy ==
Veatch was a major proponent of intellectualism, an authority on Thomistic philosophy, and one of the leading neo-Aristotelian thinkers of his time. He opposed such modern and contemporary developments as the "transcendental turn" and the "linguistic turn." A staunch advocate of plain speaking and "Hoosier" common sense, in philosophy and elsewhere, he argued on behalf of realist metaphysics and practical ethics.

Veatch's most widely read book was Rational Man: A Modern Interpretation of Aristotelian Ethics (1962) which explicitly offered a rationalist counterpoint to William Barrett's well-known study in existential philosophy, Irrational Man (1958).

== Major works ==
- Concerning the Ontological Status of Logical Forms (1948)
- Aristotelian and Mathematical Logic (1950)
- In Defense of the Syllogism (1950)
- Metaphysics and the Paradoxes (1952)
- Intentional Logic: A Logic Based on Philosophical Realism (1952)
- Realism and Nominalism Revisited (1954)
- Logic as a Human Instrument (1959, with Francis Parker)
- Rational Man: A Modern Interpretation of Aristotelian Ethics (1962)
- The Truths of Metaphysics (1964)
- Non-cognitivism in Ethics: A modest proposal for its diagnosis and cure (1966)
- Two Logics: the Conflict between Classical and Neo-Analytic Philosophy (1969)
- For an Ontology of Morals: A Critique of Contemporary Ethical Theory (1971)
- Aristotle: A Contemporary Appreciation (1974)
- Human Rights: Fact or Fancy (1985)
- Swimming Against the Current in Contemporary Philosophy (1990)

== See also ==
- American philosophy
- List of American philosophers
