= Margaret Atherton =

American historian (born 1943)

- Born: 1943 (age 81–82)
- Education: Bryn Mawr College (AB); Brandeis University (PhD)
- Era: Contemporary philosophy
- Region: Western philosophy
- Institutions: New York University, Brooklyn College, University of Maryland, College Park, University of Rochester, University of Wisconsin–Milwaukee
- Main interests: early modern period, philosophy of psychology (cognition and mind), women in philosophy, history of modern philosophy

Margaret Atherton (born 1943) is an American philosopher and feminist historian who is currently a Distinguished Professor Emerita in the Department of Philosophy at the University of Wisconsin–Milwaukee, and was a Distinguished Professor of Philosophy there before her retirement. Atherton's research has focused on philosophers of the early modern period, philosophy of psychology (cognition and mind), and the work of women philosophers, as well as teaching the history of modern philosophy.

== Education ==
Atherton attained her A.B. in Philosophy at Bryn Mawr College in 1965. In 1970, she received a Ph.D. in Philosophy from Brandeis University; her dissertation "Nativism" initiated her philosophical work on innate ideas.

== Career ==
Atherton's book, Women Philosophers of the Early Modern Period, highlights historical women who have impacted philosophy. Atherton has published many articles, been featured in several journals, and been asked to present her ideas at conferences and institutions throughout the years. George Berkeley and John Locke are seen throughout her work and reviews. Atherton has engaged in research since the 1970s and has continued to develop her methods and expand her ideas.

Atherton is a member of the British Society for the History of Philosophy, Hume Society, American Eighteenth Century Society, International Berkeley Society (Philosophy Associations Coordinator), Society for Women in Philosophy, and the American Philosophical Association.

Atherton has been a professor of philosophy at New York University, Brooklyn College, University of Maryland, University of Rochester, and the University of Wisconsin-Milwaukee.

== Works ==
- Berkeley's Revolution in Vision. Cornell University Press. 1990. ISBN 0-8014-2358-9.
- Women Philosophers of the Early Modern Period. Hackett Publishing. 1994. ISBN 0-87220-259-3.
- Margaret Atherton, ed. (1999). The Empiricists: Critical Essays on Locke, Berkeley, and Hume. Rowman & Littlefield. ISBN 978-0-8476-8913-2.
