= Nancy Kendrick =

American philosopher

- Born: Early Modern Philosophy
- Awards: Turbayne Essay Prize

Education
- Education: University of Illinois at Urbana–Champaign

Philosophical work
- Era: 21st century Philosophy
- Region: Western philosophy
- School: Continental

Nancy Kendrick is an American philosopher and William and Elsie Prentice Professor of Philosophy at Wheaton College (Massachusetts). She is known for her expertise on George Berkeley and has been president of the International Berkeley Society since 2015.

== See also ==
- Stephen Daniel
