= Leila Haaparanta =

Finnish philosopher (born 1954)

Leila Tuulikki Haaparanta (née Taiminen, born 20 October 1954) is a Finnish philosopher who works in analytic philosophy and the philosophy of logic. She is retired from the University of Tampere as a professor emerita.

== Education and career ==
Haaparanta was born on 20 October 1954 in Kalvola. She studied philosophy at the University of Helsinki, earning a bachelor's degree in 1976, a master's degree in 1978, a licenciate in 1979, and a Ph.D. in 1985; her dissertation was Frege's Doctrine of Being.

She taught at the University of Helsinki from 1977 to 1994, becoming an assistant in 1987, and held an affiliation as a researcher at the Academy of Finland from 1985 to 1997. She became a professor at the University of Tampere in 1998, and retired as professor emerita in 2018.

== Books ==
Haaparanta is the editor of:

- Frege Synthesized: Essays on the Philosophical and Foundational Work of Gottlob Frege (with Jaakko Hintikka, D. Reidel Publishing, 1986)
- Mind, Meaning and Mathematics: Essays on the Philosophical Views of Husserl and Frege (Synthese Library 237, Springer, 1994)
- Analytic Philosophy in Finland (with Ilkka Niiniluoto, Rodopi, 2003)
- The Development of Modern Logic (Oxford University Press, 2009)
- Categories of Being: Essays on Metaphysics and Logic (with Heikki J. Koskinen, Oxford University Press, 2012)

== Recognition ==
Haaparanta was elected to the Finnish Academy of Science and Letters in 2002, and to the Academia Europaea in 2011.

A festschrift in her honor, Filosofisia tutkielmia: Philosophical Studies in honorem Leila Haaparanta, was edited by Luoma Kaisa, Oesch Erna, and Vilkko Risto, and published in 2004.
