= Stephen Daniel =

American philosopher (1950–2025)

Stephen H. Daniel
- Born: June 9, 1950 (age 76); Salisbury, North Carolina
- Died: June 24, 2025
- Awards: Presidential Professor for Teaching Excellence

Education
- Education: Saint Louis University
- Thesis: The Philosophic Methodology of John Toland (1977)
- Doctoral advisor: James Daniel Collins

Philosophical work
- Era: 21st century Philosophy
- Region: Western philosophy
- School: Continental
- Main interests: philosophy of George Berkeley

Stephen H. Daniel (June 9, 1950 – June 24, 2025) was an American philosopher and professor of philosophy at Texas A&M University. He is known for his expertise on George Berkeley. Daniel was the senior editor of Berkeley Studies and was the president of International Berkeley Society between 2006 and 2015.

== Books ==
- George Berkeley and Early Modern Philosophy, New York: Oxford University Press, 2021
- Contemporary Continental Thought, Upper Saddle River, NJ: Prentice-Hall, 2005
- The Philosophy of Jonathan Edwards: A Study in Divine Semiotics. Bloomington: Indiana University Press, 1994
- Myth and Modern Philosophy. Philadelphia: Temple University Press, 1990
- John Toland: His Methods, Manners, and Mind. Montreal: McGill-Queen's University Press, 1984

== See also ==
- Nancy Kendrick
