= Pauli Pylkkö =

Finnish philosopher

Pauli Pylkkö is a Finnish philosopher. He was a student of Jaakko Hintikka, and later a professor and a researcher in both the United States and Finland. Pylkkö has addressed such topics as logic, semiotics, philosophy of language, and cognitive science. Pylkkö has published several works focused specifically on the philosophy of Martin Heidegger, and his works have examined the often problematic relationships between language and subjectivity, nationalism, the limits of scientific rationality, and the semiotic and linguistic mechanics of fascism. His work has also aroused interest in theological research.

== Selected publications ==
- "Tonal harmony as a formal system", Teoksessa: Essays on the philosophy of music. Toim. Rantala, Rowell, Tarasti. Acta Philosophica Fennica, v. 43. 1985
- Kognitiotieteen filosofinen kritiikki. Helsingin yliopiston teoreettisen filosofian laitos. 1995.
- Nazism as preconceptual experience, toim. Kirchberg a. Wechsel : The Austrian Ludwig Wittgenstein Society, 1996.
- "On surprise". Semiotica, vol 112. de Gruyter: 1996
- The Aconceptual Mind: Heideggerian themes in holistic naturalism, John Benjamins, 1998
- Richard Wagner ajattelijana - antimodernisti, luonnonmystikko, gnostikko, 2005
- ”Wolfgang Pauli and Martin Heidegger on the Limits of Scientific Rationality”. Teoksessa Ketvel, Urho et al. (toim.) (1996), Vastakohtien todellisuus: Juhlakirja professori K. V. Laurikaisen 80-vuotispäivänä. Yliopistopaino, Helsinki.
- ”Onko nykyinen tiede välttämättä onto-teo-loogista Heideggerin tarkoittamassa mielessä?” Ajatus 51, 187–211.
- ”Suomen kieli on vetäytymässä ja jättämässä meidät rauhaan toisiltamme”. Niin & näin 1/1998, s. 44–49.
- ”Schelling ja panteismikiista”. Teoksessa: Friedrich Wilhelm Joseph Schelling, 2004 [1809]. Filosofisia tutkimuksia ihmisen vapauden olemuksesta ja muista aiheeseen liittyvistä kysymyksistä. Käännös ja selitykset Saul Boman. Kiel: Uuni Verlag, 141–230.
- "Lemuurien yö - Ernst Jünger ja kansallissosialismi" Teoksessa: Ernst Jünger, 2006 Marmorijyrkänteillä Kustavi: Uuni Ay 155–198.
- ”Merkillisyys ja herrastelu – käännös fennomanian umpikujassa”. Niin & näin 1/2006, 7–15.
- Luopumisen dialektiikka. Taivassalo : Uuni, cop. 2009.
- "Mikä vasemmistoa todella vaivaa - Tommi Uschanovin pamfletin Mikä vasemmistoa vaivaa? tarkastelua". 2010
- "Onko viisas toiminta aina hyveellistä? - Arto Tukiaisen kirjaluonnoksen Kirjanen filosofisesta elämäntavasta (www.artotukiainen.net) tarkastelua". 2010
- "Fyysikkoviikari filosofian ihmemaassa eli olisiko tiedeuskovaisuutta hoidettava lääkkeillä ja kirurgialla?. 2012
- "Hegel’s logic and Frege’s Star paradox". Cosmos and History: The Journal of Natural and Social Philosophy, Vol 15, No 1 (2019)
- "Ambiguity and contradiction ‒ the outlines of Jung’s dialectics", The Journal of Analytical Psychology, Volume 64, Issue 5 (2019)
- "Measurements as Sentences: Outlines of a Dialectic-Idealist Interpretation of Quantum Theory". Mind and Matter, Volume 20, Issue 2, 2022.
- "Jung’s Psychoid Monism" J Anal Psychol, 68: 515–533, (2023).
- Premodern handcraft skills foster a language which opens an experiential pathway to local nature. Acta Borealia, 41(1), 60–64 (2024).
