= Ikaalinen =

Ikaalinen Ikalis
- City
- Ikaalisten kaupunki Ikalis stad
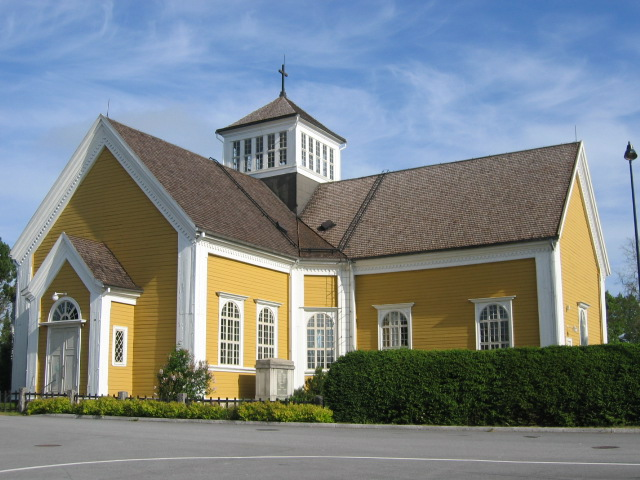
- Ikaalinen Church

- Coat of arms

- Location of Ikaalinen in Finland
- Interactive map of Ikaalinen
- Coordinates: 61°46′N 023°04′E
- Country: Finland
- Region: Pirkanmaa
- Sub-region: North Western Pirkanmaa
- Charter: 1858
- City rights: 1977

Government
  - Town manager: Eeva Viitanen

Area (2018-01-01)
  - Total: 843.40 km^{2} (325.64 sq mi)
  - Land: 750.48 km^{2} (289.76 sq mi)
  - Water: 93.16 km^{2} (35.97 sq mi)
  - Rank: 111th largest in Finland

Population (2025-12-31)
  - Total: 6,704
  - Rank: 136th largest in Finland
  - Density: 8.93/km^{2} (23.1/sq mi)

Population by native language
  - Finnish: 95.1% (official)
  - Others: 4.9%

Population by age
  - 0 to 14: 13.7%
  - 15 to 64: 53.8%
  - 65 or older: 32.4%
- Time zone: UTC+02:00 (EET)
  - Summer (DST): UTC+03:00 (EEST)
- Postal code: 39500
- Website: ikaalinen.fi

Ikaalinen (Finnish: [ˈikɑːlinen]; Swedish: Ikalis) is a city and municipality of Finland. It is part of the Pirkanmaa region, located 55 kilometres (34 mi) northwest of Tampere. The town has a population of 6,704 (31 December 2025) and covers an area of 843.40 square kilometres (325.64 sq mi) of which 93.16 km^{2} (35.97 sq mi) is water.

The municipalities next to it are Hämeenkyrö, Jämijärvi, Kankaanpää, Parkano, Sastamala and Ylöjärvi. The municipality is unilingually Finnish.

Ikaalinen is known for Ikaalinen Spa, Sata-Häme Soi and Toivolansaari Camping.

The Seitseminen national park is partly located in the municipality.

S. Albert Kivinen, a writer and associate professor of philosophy of the University of Helsinki, is a native of Ikaalinen and his story Keskiyön Mato Ikaalisissa ("The Midnight Worm in Ikaalinen") is set there.

Ikaalinen is located in the middle of the old Upper Satakunta, and for centuries, until the 1990s, it belonged to the province of Satakunta and the provinces of Turku and Pori.

Ikaalinen became an independent municipality in 1641. The associated market town was founded in 1858. The market town and the municipality were united in 1972 and Ikaalinen became a town in 1977.

The central part of Ikaalinen, a former church village and township, now the Vanhakauppala district, is located on a peninsula on the shores of Lake Kyrösjärvi. The municipality extends east–west on both sides around the northern end of the lake. Lake Kyrösjärvi, like the entire municipality, is part of the Kokemäenjoki watershed.

The centre of Ikaalinen is on lake Kyrösjärvi near the highway 3 (E12).

== Transport ==
The private coach company OnniBus route Helsinki—Seinäjoki—Vaasa has a stop at Ikaalinen.

== Notable people ==
- Sulo Aittoniemi, congressman
- Outi Borgenström, sportsperson (orienteering)
- Oskar Gripenberg, general
- Edvard Gylling, politician (SDP, SKP), statistician
- S. Albert Kivinen, philosopher
- Jarmo Kujanpää, sportsperson (football)
- Kalervo Kurkiala, chaplain (1931–38)
- Matti Pitkänen, sportsperson (cross country skiing)
- Krista Pärmäkoski, sportsperson (cross country skiing)
- Samuli Samuelsson, sportsperson (sprinter)
- Bertel Strömmer, architect

== See also ==
- Nokia, another spa town in the Pirkanmaa region
