= Scheler =

Scheler is a surname. Notable people with the surname include:

- Bernt Scheler (born 1955), Swedish cyclist
- Fritz Scheler (1925–2002), German physician and nephrologist
- Jean Auguste Ulric Scheler (1819–1890), Belgian philologist
- Lucien Scheler (1902–1999), French author
- Max Scheler (1874–1928), German philosopher
- Walter Scheler (1923–2008), German clerical worker
- Werner Scheler (born 1923), German physician
