= Fritz Scheler =

German internist (1925–2002)

Fritz Scheler (5 August 1925 – 4 June 2002) was a German internist, nephrologist and university professor. He was a pioneer in the field of hemofiltration treatment and helped found an institute for drug law at the University of Göttingen.

== Life ==
Fritz Scheler was born on 5 August 1925 in Mengersgereuth as the only child of a train conductor and a seamstress in southern Thuringia. Werner Scheler was his first cousin. Fritz Scheler went to school in Sonneberg. Scheler was married in 1955 to Elisabeth Correns, grandchild of Carl Correns.

Scheler studied medicine at the universities of Göttingen and Freiburg. In 1954 he received his doctorate in Göttingen. Scheler's Habilitation on extracorporal hemodialysis followed in 1964. From 1967 until 1993 he was director of the department for nephrology and rheumatology of the medical faculty at the Universität Göttingen. Scheler died on 4 June 2002 in Göttingen.

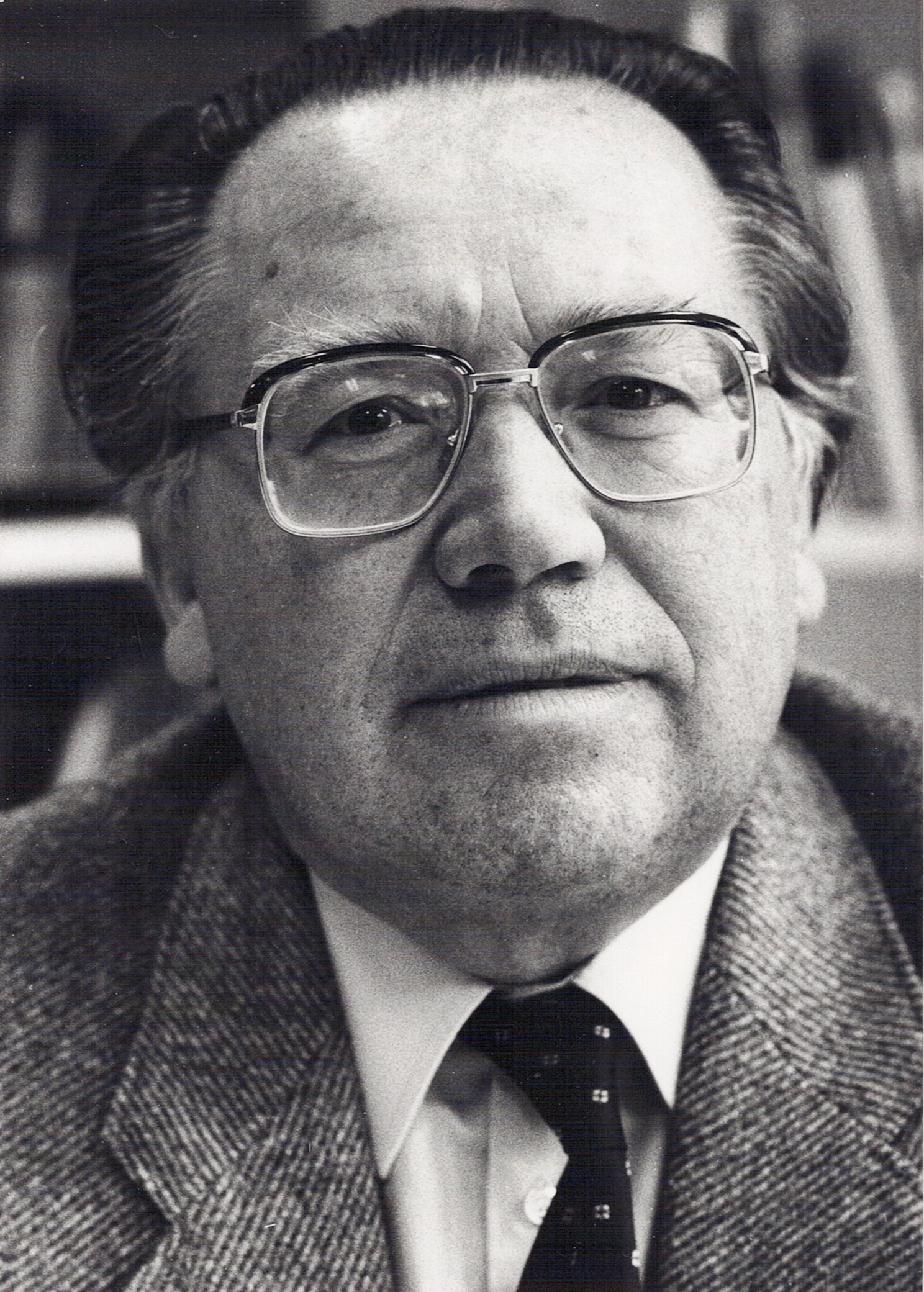
Fritz Scheler b. 1925 - 1983

== Hemofiltration research ==
Scheler invented the term of hemofiltration, and was co-inventor and pioneer in the development of hemofiltration, a process that filters blood through a membrane to remove water and other waste. This method was developed and applied for the first time by his assistant Peter Kramer in Göttingen, as a technique (spontaneous filtration) which uses the intrinsic pressure of the patient's circulation for dissociating blood plasma, in order to acutely support cardiac function during cardiac failure. Later the different techniques of hemofiltration (CAVH, CVVH etc.) were further developed. Hemofiltration was regarded by Willem Kolff in a letter to Scheler as the next step since Kolff's invention of dialysis.

== Drug safety research ==
Scheler had a lifelong interest in pharmacology since his early work at the Max Planck Institute for Experimental Medicine. After the invention of hemofiltration, and the early, tragic death of Peter Kramer, he increasingly focussed on his work at the committee for drug safety in Germany (Arzneimittelkommission der Deutschen Ärzteschaft). He belonged to this committee since 1975, from 1981 until 1993 he became its president. During this time a number of political decisions were strongly contested, such as the introduction of a 'positive list' of drugs which could only be reimbursed by public health care insurance, and which Scheler successfully opposed. He was also involved in the foundation of an institute for drug law at the university of Göttingen, which has by now been further developed to a leading institution of medicine law. Scheler received an honorary doctorate of the law department of the university of Göttingen in recognition of his contributions to this institute in 1995.

== Further work ==
Scheler published approximately 300 papers on a number of topics concerning hypertension, renal and cardiac failure, diabetic nephropathy and other topics together with his clinical research group.

== Honors and awards ==
- Ernst-von-Bergmann-Plakette (1985)
- Friedrich-Voges-Medaille der Kassenärztlichen Bundesvereinigung
- Paracelsus-Medaille der Deutschen Ärzteschaft (1994)
- Ehrendoktorwürde der Juristischen Fakultät der Georg-August-Universität Göttingen (1995)
- Ehrenmitglied der Gesellschaft für Nephrologie (1996)
- Verdienstorden der Bundesrepublik Deutschland (1997)
- Fritz-Scheler-Stipendium der KfH-Stiftung Präventivmedizin
