= Walter Scheler =

- Born: 18 April 1923; Sonneberg, Thuringia, Germany
- Died: 19 August 2008 (aged 85); Jena, Thuringia, Germany
- Occupation: Activist in the 1953 East German Uprising

Walter Scheler (18 April 1923 – 19 August 2008) was, by the time he retired, an East German clerical worker.

He participated in the Uprising of 1953 in East Germany as a spokesman for the Coal Workers of Jena. He was then arrested by Soviet occupation troops and sentenced a few days later to spend 25 years in a Labor camp. In the event he received an official pardon in 1961 and was subsequently released. More than three decades later, in 1993, he was formally rehabilitated when the Russian Attorney general nullified the original court decision under which Scheler had been detained.

After reunification in 1990, Scheler contributed significantly to the rediscovery by researchers of what had actually happened in East Germany back in June 1953, throwing light on events which at the time had not been extensively reported or discussed in public even within the German Democratic Republic itself.
