= Matti Janhunen =

Finnish politician (1902–1963)

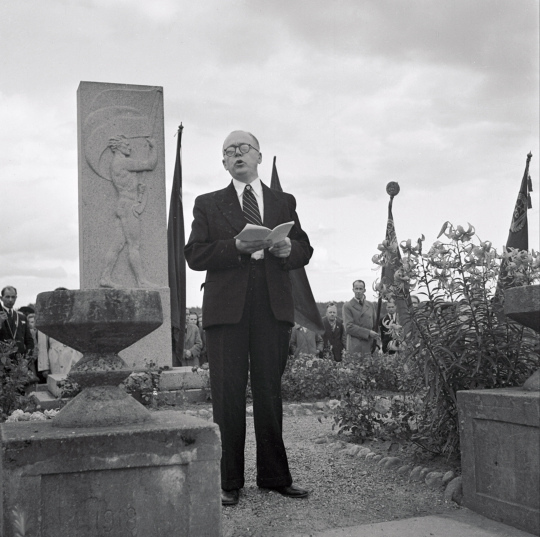
Matti Janhunen speaking in 1948

Matti Janhunen (22 November 1902 – 9 December 1963) was a Finnish politician, born in Rautalampi. He was a member of the Communist Party of Finland (SKP) and of the Finnish People's Democratic League (SKDL). He served as Deputy Minister of Social Affairs from 17 April 1945 to 26 March 1946 and as Minister of Social Affairs from 26 March 1946 to 29 July 1948. Janhunen was imprisoned from 1934 to 1944 for his activities in the then illegal Communist Party of Finland. After the Communist Party was legalized as a result of the Moscow Armistice of 19 September 1944, Janhunen resumed his liberty and his political career.
