= International Institute of Applied Aesthetics =

Finnish environmental institute

- Purpose: environmental aesthetics
- Website: http://www.helsinki.fi/iiaa/index.htm

The International Institute of Applied Aesthetics (IIAA) is an institute operating under the Palmenia Center for Continuing Education of the University of Helsinki. It is focused on environmental aesthetics and other kinds of humanistic environmental research.

== General information ==
The Institute is situated in Lahti, Finland and its functional fields include research, education and publishing. It is also active in organizing international and domestic seminars.

In 2008 the Institute was affiliated with the Aesthetics department of the University of Helsinki and in 2010 it became a part of the Palmenia Center.

== List of IIAA publications in English ==
- Aesthetics in the Human Environment (Eds. von Bonsdorff, Pauline & Arto Haapala) 1999
- Aesthetics of the Unavoidable – Aesthetic Variations in Human Appearance (by Naukkarinen, Ossi) 1998 (Full text)
- The City as Cultural Metaphor (Ed. Haapala, Arto) 1998
- The Human Habitat – Aesthetic and Axiological Perspectives (by von Bonsdorff, Pauline) 1998 (Full text)
- Art and Beyond – Finnish Approaches to Aesthetics (Eds. Naukkarinen, Ossi & Olli Immonen) 1995
