= Matti Häyry =

Finnish philosopher (born 1956)

- Born: 20 September 1956 (age 69); Turku, Finland

Philosophical work
- Era: Contemporary philosophy
- Region: Western philosophy
- Main interests: Moral philosophy, political philosophy, bioethics

Matti Johannes Häyry (Finnish pronunciation: [ˈmɑtːi ˈhæy̯ry]; born 20 September 1956) is a Finnish philosopher. He teaches courses on Business Ethics and the Philosophy of Social Science at Aalto University. Häyry specialises in moral and political philosophy, and bioethics.

== Education ==
Häyry began his education at the National Defence University, Finland, where he earned a Commissioned Officer's Degree and Certificate between 1976 and 1979. Subsequently, he attended the University of Helsinki, obtaining a Bachelor of Arts in 1983, followed by a Master of Social Science in 1984. Continuing his academic advancement, he achieved a Licentiate in Social Science in 1987 and a Master of Arts from the Department of Philosophy in 1990. In 1991, he was awarded a Doctor of Social Science degree from the same university.

== Career ==
Matti Häyry's career spans several decades and includes positions in academia and research. He began his professional journey in the Finnish Defence Forces, serving as a Commissioned Officer in Signals and Communication from 1979 to 1981. Following this, he transitioned to academia, working as a Lecturer and Research Fellow in Practical and Theoretical Philosophy at the University of Helsinki from 1985 to 1995. He then served as Acting Professor of Practical Philosophy at the same university from 1995 to 1996.

Between 1997 and 2000, he was an Academy Research Fellow at the Academy of Finland and the University of Helsinki. Subsequently, he became a Professor of Philosophy at the University of Kuopio from 1999 to 2002. From 2001 to 2004, in the United Kingdom, he served as a Professor of Moral Philosophy and Head of the Centre for Professional Ethics at the University of Central Lancashire in Preston.

In 2004, he joined the University of Manchester, where he worked as a Professor of Bioethics and Philosophy of Law until 2013. During this time, he also held a Professorial Fellowship at the Collegium for Advanced Studies at the University of Helsinki from 2009 to 2011.

In 2013, he returned to Finland, joining the Aalto University School of Business in Helsinki as a Professor of Philosophy of Management, a position he held until 2024. Currently, he is a Professor and Senior Fellow at Aalto University in Espoo.

In an endeavour to express ethical ideas in an artistic format, Häyry produced in 2013 – with Tuija Takala, Corky Laing, and Lasse Väyrynen – a concept album on the ethics of genetics, Playing God—The Rock Opera.

Häyry is a founding member of the International Association of Bioethics and he served on its board of directors from 2001 to 2009, and from 2007 to 2009 as the association's president.

== Philosophy ==
Häyry's main fields of interest have been moral and political philosophy and bioethics. His practical topics in bioethics have ranged from abortion, euthanasia, and resource allocation to genetics, systems biology, and synthetic biology. Theoretically, his work has centred on the main normative doctrines of European moral and political philosophy.

Häyry is an antinatalist. He has participated in various podcasts and written a few papers on the subject.

== Works ==
- Häyry, Matti & Häyry, Heta, Rakasta, kärsi ja unhoita: Moraalifilosofisia pohdintoja ihmiselämän alusta ja lopusta. Kirjayhtymä 1987. ISBN 951-26-3126-1
- Häyry, Heta & Häyry, Matti, Taide, tunne ja turmelus: Kaksi näkökulmaa R. G. Collingwoodin estetiikkaan. Helsingin yliopiston filosofian laitoksen julkaisuja 4/1989. ISBN 951-45-5185-0
- Häyry, Matti, Critical studies in philosophical medical ethics. University of Helsinki 1990. ISBN 951-45-5554-6
- Häyry, Matti, Liberal utilitarianism and applied ethics. Routledge 1994. ISBN 0-415-07785-0
- Häyry, Heta & Häyry, Matti, Hyvä, kaunis, tosi – arvojen filosofiaa. Yliopistopaino 1997. ISBN 951-570-357-3
- Häyry, Heta & Häyry, Matti, Elämän ehdot: Bioetiikan, vapauden ja vastuun filosofiaa. Yliopistopaino 1997. ISBN 951-570-354-9
- Häyry, Matti, Ihannevaltio: Historiallinen johdatus yhteiskuntafilosofiaan. WSOY 2000. ISBN 951-0-25224-7
- Häyry, Matti, Mahdollisimman monen onnellisuus: Utilitarismin historia, teoria ja sovellukset. WSOY 2001. ISBN 951-0-25858-X
- Häyry, Matti, Playing God: Essays on Bioethics. Helsinki University Press 2001. ISBN 951-570-495-2
- Häyry, Matti, Hyvä elämä ja oikea käytös: Historiallinen johdatus moraalifilosofiaan. Yliopistopaino 2002. ISBN 951-570-517-7
- Häyry, Matti, Cloning, Selection, and Values: Essays on Bioethical Intuitions. Acta Philosophica Fennica 2007. ISBN 978-951-9264-62-2
- Häyry, Matti, Rationality and the Genetic Challenge: Making People Better? Cambridge University Press 2010. ISBN 978-0521757133
- Häyry, Matti, Ihminen 2.0: Geneettisen valikoinnin ja parantelun eettiset kysymykset. Gaudeamus 2012. ISBN 978-952-495-249-1
