= Arto Haapala =

Finnish philosopher

Arto Haapala (born 1959) is a Finnish philosopher, aesthetician and Professor of Aesthetics at the Department of Philosophy, History, Culture and Art Studies at Helsinki University, Finland. Haapala received his PhD from Birkbeck, University of London in 1985. He is also active in the work of the Finnish Society for Aesthetics and the International Institute of Applied Aesthetics in Lahti, Finland.

In addition to aesthetics, Haapala also specialises in hermeneutics, especially the philosophy of Hans-Georg Gadamer and Martin Heidegger.

== A selection of Haapala's writings in English ==
- Emotion, the role of experience and fiction. International Yearbook of Aesthetics. 1 (1996), pp. 27–37.
- Artistic creativity: Skills and style. Selected papers of the 15th International Congress of Aesthetics. Edited by Kiyokazu Nishimura, Ken-ichi Iwaki, Tanehisa Otabe, Ken-ichi Sasaki, and Eski Tsugami, pp. 87–96.
- Aesthetics in the Human Environment. Edited by Arto Haapala and Pauline von Bonsdorff. Taiteiden tutkimuksen laitos, Helsinki, 1999.
- Aesthetic experience and the ethical dimension: Essays on moral problems in aesthetics. Edited by Arto Haapala and Oiva Kuisma. Taiteiden tutkimuksen laitos, Helsinki, 1999.
- Truth, game and art: Heidegger and Gadamer on the ontology of the work of art. Festskrift till Johan Wrede 18.10.1995. Taiteiden tutkimuksen laitos, Helsinki, 1995.
