= Heikki Ikäheimo =

Finnish philosopher (born 1966)

Heikki Ikäheimo (born 1966) is a professor of philosophy at University of New South Wales.

== Selected publications ==
- Ikaheimo, Heikki; Laitinen, Arto, eds. (2011-03-24). Recognition and Social Ontology. Brill. doi:10.1163/ej.9789004202900.i-398. ISBN 978-90-04-20750-9.
- Ikäheimo, Heikki (2022-05-18). Recognition and the Human Life-Form: Beyond Identity and Difference (1 ed.). New York: Routledge. doi:10.4324/9781003272120. ISBN 978-1-003-27212-0.
