= Intentional Logic =

Book by Henry Babcock Veatch

Intentional Logic: A Logic Based on Philosophical Realism
- Author: Henry Babcock Veatch
- Language: English
- Subject: Philosophy
- Published: 1952 (Yale University Press); 1970 (Archon Books)
- Publication place: United States
- Media type: Hardback
- Pages: 440
- OCLC: 1742427
- LC Class: BC
- Preceded by: Metaphysics and the Paradoxes
- Followed by: Realism and Nominalism Revisited

Intentional Logic: A Logic Based on Philosophical Realism is a book by Henry Babcock Veatch published in 1952.
