= Arvi Grotenfelt =

Finnish philosopher and psychologist

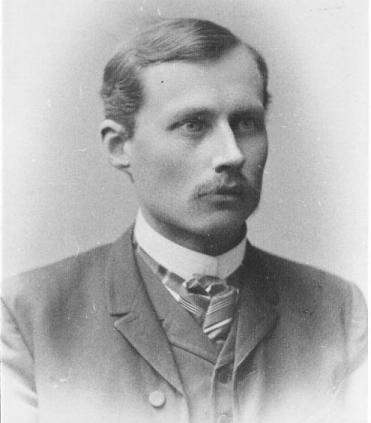
Arvi Grotenfelt

Arvid (Arvi) Grotenfelt (10 April 1863, Helsinki – 29 March 1941), was a Finnish philosopher and psychologist.

He was one of the founders of the Finnish Science Academy and the chairman of the Finnish Philosophical society 1905–36. He was also founder and first chairman of the Sällskapet för Psykisk Forskning (SPF) (1907–32). He has studied for Wilhelm Wundt and Rudolf Eucken, and written on the subject of history philosophy. In his mind historiography is always estimating, as when it comes to the selection of sources, and this can be connected to weltanschauung.

In his time Grotenfelt also was critical of the contemporary racism. He had knowledges of Houston Stewart Chamberlain, and disliked him especially. He also was critical to Arthur de Gobineaus ideas of Aryan superiority.

== Bibliography ==
- Die Wertschätzung in der Geschichte (1903)
- Geschichtliche Wertmass-stäbe in der Geschichtsphilosophie, bei Historikern un im Volksbewusstsein (1905)
- Uuden ajan filosofian historia (2 parts, 1938)
