= Erik Ahlman =

Finnish philosopher and linguist

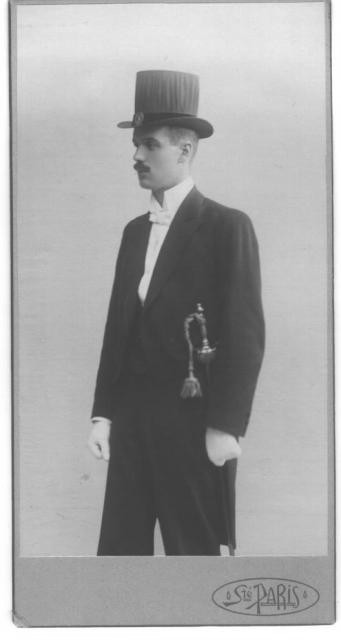
Ahlman in 1919

Erik Gustav Ahlman (8 May 1892 – 27 August 1952) was a Finnish philosopher and linguist. Ahlman initiated his academic career as a classical philologist.

Ahlman was born in Turku. He worked as a theoretical science education professor at the Jyväskylä College of Education from 1935 to 1948 (rector from 1940 to 1948) and then Professor of Moral Philosophy of the University of Helsinki from 1948 to 1952. His most important works are Arvojen ja välineiden maailma (1920), Kulttuurin perustekijöitä (1939) and Ihmisen probleemi (1953).

Ahlman's daughter was a professor of psychology at the University of Turku, Kirsti Lagerspetz (1932–2001). The family's philosophical traditions have continued at the University of Turku with philosophy professor Eerik Lagerspetz (1956–) and Åbo Akademi University philosophy professor Olli Lagerspetz (1963–).

== Publications ==
- über das lateinische Präfix com- in Verbalzusammensetzungen (1916)
- Arvojen ja välineitten maailma (1920)
- Teoria ja todellisuus (1925)
- Das normative Moment im Bedeutungsbegriff (1926)
- Arvoasetelmista (1929)
- Totuudellisuuden probleemi (1929)
- De causis quae in Ciceronis epistulis agentis usui faveant (1931)
- Olemassaolon "järjellisyys" arvoinetafyysillisenä ongelmana (1938)
- Kulttuurin perustekijöitä (1939)
- Oikeudenmukaisuus ja sen suhde moraaliin (1943)
- Ihmisen probleemi (1953)
