= Yrjö Reenpää =

Finnish physiologist and philosopher

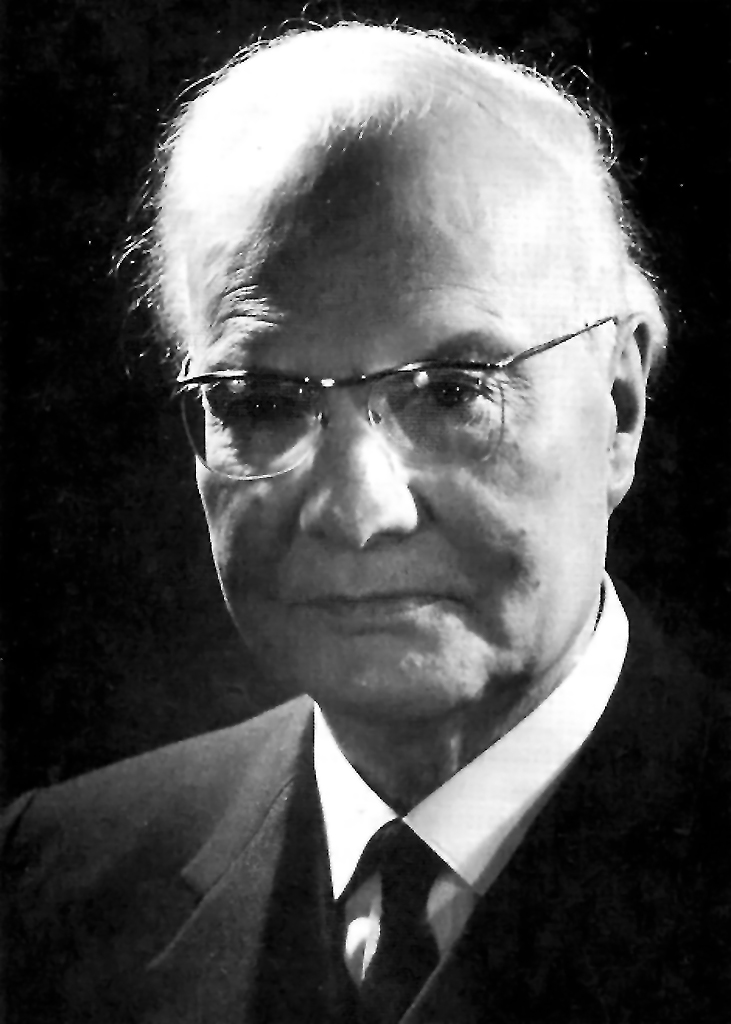
Finnish physiologist and philosopher Yrjö Reenpää in 1960s

Yrjö Reenpää (Renqvist until 1935; 18 July 1894 – 18 December 1976, Helsinki, Finland) was a Finnish physiologist and philosopher and professor of physiology in University of Helsinki. He developed general sensory physiology on the bases of Kantian epistemology, psycho-physics and phenomenology.

== Life ==
Yrjö Reenpää’s father Alvar Renqvist was owner and director of a publishing house, professor, and parliamentarian. Having graduated from the high school in 1912 Yrjö Reenpää started to study medicine in University of Helsinki. Very early he was involved in research work focused on physiology under the supervision of Robert Tigerstedt, the first professor of physiology in University of Helsinki. He wrote his doctoral thesis on the physiology of taste with the title Über den Geschmack in 1918. After having served in the medical staff of the Finnish Armed Forces during the war, he returned to the Department of Physiology in University of Helsinki to continue research in sensory physiology. In line with other scientists in the first half of the 20th century, he paid several visits to physiology departments in German universities establishing lifelong contacts to sensory physiologists like Max von Frey, Johannes von Kries and Viktor von Weizsäcker among others. After Robert Tigerstedt’s successor his son Carl Tigerstedt’s death in 1927 Reenpää was nominated to the chair of physiology, the position he held until his retirement in 1962.

== General sensory physiology ==
Having started with experimental research on sensory physiology in the fields of taste, tactile sense, muscular sense and the sense of movement, he proceeded to deal with the principal topic of general sensory physiology that of psycho-physics. Mapping the relations of measured sensation magnitudes to stimulus parameters revealed to him the structure of the phenomenal perceptual manifold and its metrics. He outlined in an axiomatic form the psycho-physical relation fitting with Kantian epistemology and with phenomenology as presented in the first half of the century by Edmund Husserl and Martin Heidegger among others. Applying psycho-physical methods he and his collaborators, R. M. Bergström, later his successor, Alvar Wilska, and Eeva Jalavisto among others, obtained experimental evidence of the structures of perceptual manifolds in various sensory modalities. After his retirement he extended the philosophical considerations to include the psycho-physiological issues of mind-matter relation and discussed psycho-physiological parallelism in cases relating perceptions to evoked response data particularly in audition in the studies by Wolf Dieter Keidel and his collaborators in the University of Erlangen, where Reenpää had a visiting professorship.

== Philosophy ==
On the bases of the studies in sensory and observational physiology Reenpää conceived that sensory perceptions constitute the fundamental knowledge base also to the natural sciences. According to him, concepts can be traced back to phenomenal observations in line with the [Kantian tables of judgment and categories]. Concepts arise from the noumenal contents of observations by extracting them out of their temporal frame of the act of perception, as purely timeless entities. The [psycho-physical] relation can according to Reenpää be regarded as an issue of simultaneous isomorphism based on conceptual correspondence rather than possessing a causal relation.

== Cultural activity ==
In addition to his scientific activities Yrjö Reenpää was among others the president of the Finnish Medical Society (Duodecim) in 1933–1936, president of the Nordic Society of Physiology in 1936–1939, chairman of the Finnish Academy of Science and Letters (1942–1943). He was also nominated as the member of Heidelberg Academy for Sciences and Humanities (1939). He was one of the founding members of the Finnish Cultural Foundation and had a position as its first chairman (1937–1953). The Foundation nominated the annual series of lectures for invited outstanding foreign scientists, as Yrjö Reenpää Memorial Lecture since 1979.

== Publications ==
- Allgemeine Sinnesphysiologie, Springer, Wien, 1936.
- Über Wahrnehmen, Denken und messendes Versuchen, Biblioth Biotheor Ser D II, 1-248, E.J.Brill, Leiden, 1947.
- Die Dualität des Verstandes, Sitzungsb Heidelberg Akad Wiss Mat-naturwiss Kl Abh, 1-76, 1950.
- Der Verstand als Anschauung und Begriff, Ann Acad sci Fenn Ser B T 76, 1-113, 1952
- Aufbau der allgemeinen Sinnesphysiologie. Grundlegung einer Wissenschaft vom Beobachten, Vittorio Klostermann, Fr.a.M., 1959.
- Theorie des Sinneswahrnehmens, Ann. Acad. Sci. Fenn. Ser A V Medica 78, 1961.
- Allgemeine Sinnesphysiologie, Vittorio Klostermann, Fr.a.M., 1962.
- Über die Zeit, Darstellung und Kommentar einiger Interpretationen des Zeitlichen in der Philosophie. Über die Zeit in den Naturwissenschaften, Acta phil. Fennic. XIX, 1966.
- Wahrnehmen, Beobachten, Konstituieren. Phänomenologie und Begriffsbestimmung der ersten Erkenntnisakte, Vittorio Klostermann, Fr.a.M. 1967.
- Über das Körper-Seele-Problem, Neuere philosophische Auffassungen, in Neue Anthropolgie, Band 5, Psychologische Antropologie, (Hrg. H.-G. Gadamer, P. Vogler), Georg Thieme Verlag, Stuttgart, 1973.
