= Thomas Wallgren =

Philosopher

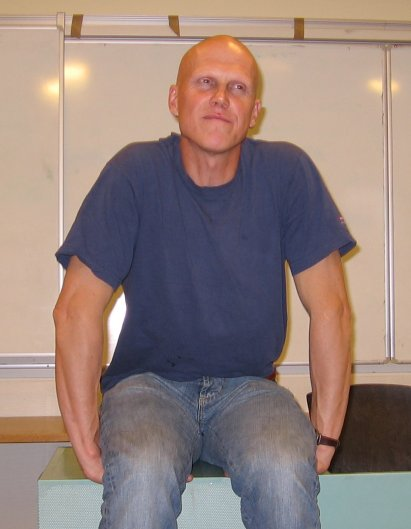
Thomas Wallgren in September 2006

Thomas Wallgren (born 28 February 1958) is a Swedish-speaking Finnish philosopher, activist and politician. He studied philosophy at the University of Helsinki where he is serving as professor of philosophy since 2019.

He was active in the Koijärvi Movement in the 1980s, and opposed Finnish membership of the European Union. In 2015 he signed citizens' initiative of centre-right Keskusta politician Paavo Väyrynen to hold a referendum on Finland's membership of the euro area. He has written about his doubts about the validity of the EU as a postwar "project of peace", arguing furthermore that the EU today suffers from a “democracy deficit”.

Wallgren first came to public attention through his "environmental stunts", which included buying shares in large Finnish corporations, such as Nokia, only for the purpose of gaining the right to speak at their shareholders' conferences, where he would then raise the issue of the company's lack of environmentalism.

In 2008, he was elected to the Helsinki City Council as a Social Democrat (SDP), representing its centrist wing. In 2012, he was reelected. He stood as a candidate in the 2019 general election for the SDP but was not elected.

== Selection of books in English ==
- "Transformative Philosophy. Socrates, Wittgenstein, and the democratic spirit of philosophy", Lexington Books, 2005.
- "Challenge of philosophy: Beyond contemplation and critical theory", 1996.
- "Commonality and particularity in ethics", edited with Lilli Alanen and Sara Heinämaa, Macmillan, 1997.

== Recent Publications ==
- "Georg Henrik von Wright: a Memorial Notice". Philosophical Investigations, 28: 1–13, 2005.
- Preface, in Niiniluoto and T. Wallgren (eds.): On the Human Condition. Philosophical Essays in Honour of the Centennial Anniversary of Georg Henrik von Wright, 463 pp. Fasc. XCIII (2017): ISBN 978-951-9264-86-8, Helsinki 2017.
- “Wittgenstein's Modernist Political Philosophy”. In Anat Matar (ed), Wittgenstein and Modernism, Bloomsbury, London and New York. 2017.
- "Introduction" (with J. Backström, H, Nykänen and N. Toivakainen), in The Moral Foundations of Philosophy of Mind, eds. J. Backström, H, Nykänen, N. Toivakainen and T. Wallgren, 2019.
- "Mind and Moral Matter: On how to get right the getting it right issue in the philosophy of mind" in The Moral Foundations of Philosophy of Mind, eds. J. Backström, H, Nykänen, N. Toivakainen and T. Wallgren, 2019
- "Habermas in Finnland", with R. Huttunen and A. Laitinen in Luca Corchia, Stefan Müller-Doohm und William Outhwaite (hrsg), Habermas Global. Eine mondiale Wirkungsgeschichte, Suhrkamp, Frankfurt am Main. 2019.
- "Queer scepticism, Socrates, Sextus Empiricus and Wittgenstein". In António Marques & Rui Bertrand Romão (eds.) Wittgenstein and the Sceptical Tradition, Bern, Berlin, Bruxelles, Frankfurt am Main, New York, Oxford, Wien, Peter Lang, 2020.
- Wallgren, Thomas: "After Sustainability: Modernity, Freedom and Reason in the Age of Climate Alarmism", In Crisis and Critique: Philosophical Analysis and Current Events (eds.Edited by: Anne Siegetsleitner, Andreas Oberprantacher, Marie-Luisa Frick and Ulrich Metschl Volume 28 in the series Publications of the Austrian Ludwig Wittgenstein Society – New Series. https://doi.org/10.1515/9783110702255, 2021.
- Thomas Wallgren and Niklas Toivakainen: The Question of Technology: From Noise to Reflection, In, Heikkurinen, Pasi and Ruuska, Toni (eds.) Sustainability Beyond Technology, Oxford University Press 2022
- "Inledning" in Joel Backström and Thomas Wallgren (eds.), Den okände von Wright. Tidskritik och andra texter av Georg Henrik von Wright 1926–1997, SLS/Appell, 2023, also published as e-book.
- "Introduction" in T. Wallgren (ed) The Creation of Wittgenstein: Understanding the roles of Rush Rhees, Elizabeth Anscombe and Georg Henrik von Wright, London: Bloomsbury Academic, 2023.
- "Unearthing the Socratic Wittgenstein", in Understanding the roles of Rush Rhees, Elizabeth Anscombe and Georg Henrik von Wright, in T. Wallgren (ed.) The Creation of Wittgenstein: Understanding the roles of Rush Rhees, Elizabeth Anscombe and Georg Henrik von Wright, London: Bloomsbury Academic, 2023.
- "Introduction" in Thomas Wallgren, Uddhab Pyakurel, Catalina Revollo Pardo and Teivo Teivainen (ed.s) Challenging Authoritarian Capitalism: The Transformative Power of the World Social Forum (Routledge 2023).
- "Complexity, Technology and the Future of Transformative Politics", with Ritu Priya and Vijay Pratap, published in Thomas Wallgren, Uddhab Pyakurel, Catalina Revollo Pardo and Teivo Teivainen (ed.s) Challenging Authoritarian Capitalism: The Transformative Power of the World Social Forum (Routledge 2023)
- "Nato-jäsenyys olisi eettisesti väärin" - Kosmopolis Vol 53 Nro 1 (2023), ss. 80 - 84.
- "The Heart of the Heart: Wittgenstein's place in political theory", in L. Rasiński, A. Biletzki, L. Koczanowicz, A. Pichler, and T. Wallgren (eds); Wittgenstein and Democratic Politics, Routledge Studies in Twentieth-Century Philosophy, 2024.
- "Conclusion: Philosophy and / or Politics: Learning from Engagement with Wittgenstein" (co-authored with Anat Biletzki), in L. Rasiński, A. Biletzki, L. Koczanowicz, A. Pichler, and T. Wallgren (eds); Wittgenstein and Democratic Politics, Routledge Studies in Twentieth-Century Philosophy, 2024.
