= S. Albert Kivinen =

Finnish philosopher (1933–2021)

Seppo Albert Kivinen (19 October 1933, in Ikaalinen - 13 August 2021) was a Finnish author and doctor of philosophy and docent emeritus of University of Helsinki, known for his occult interests and study of monsters. He is a onetime winner of the Atorox Award for best Finnish short story, for his Lovecraftian pastiche Keskiyön Mato Ikaalisissa. Kivinen is a well known fixture in Finnish academia and a proponent of the study of the history of the occult with a sceptical bent.

== Personal history ==
Kivinen did his dissertation 1977 in the University of Helsinki in theoretical philosophy. He worked as the chairman of the Finland–Mongolia society in the early 1970s and as a member of the board of trustees of the Finnish Parapsychological society 1972–1974 and the Transscendentaaliradieastrian society during 1974–1987. He also served as the chairman of Skepsis society (the Finnish skeptics society).

Besides his writings based on the mythos created by H. P. Lovecraft, he has also recorded politico-philosophic songs even with the co-operation of such notable Finnish artists as M. A. Numminen.

== Philosophy ==
Kivinen has in his study of ontology researched the problem of universality, and has set himself on a stance of realism, and a notion of "ontic communism", which he puts into words in the form of "There are many individuals in the world. These individuals have diverse similar (and distinguishing) characteristics." Also the mind-body problem has interested him. Besides Aristotle, his influences have been the Cambridge philosophers Bertrand Russell, G. E. Moore and C. D. Broad. Of which the last one being his avowed favorite.

== Works ==
- C. D. Broad’s views on abstracta, 1976. Helsinki University Department of Philosophy, Helsinki.
- Merkilliset kirjoitukset: Novelleja, artikkeleita, filosofiaa, 1990. Pirkanmaan kirjapaino ja lehtikustannus, Tampere.
- Metafyysisiä esseitä, 1999. University Press, Helsinki.
- Lauluja (CD), 2003. Love Records.
- Merkilliset kirjoitukset: Novelleja, artikkeleita, filosofiaa, 2006, 2. edition. Siniplaneetta, Tampere.

=== Notable articles ===
- ”Mitä 'paranormaaleilla ilmiöillä' tarkoitetaan?” in the work Paholaisen asianajaja: Opaskirja skeptikolle (The Devils Advocate: A Manual For the Skeptic).
