= Berkeley Studies =

- Discipline: Philosophy
- Language: English
- Edited by: Stephen Daniel

Publication details
- History: 1977–present
- Frequency: Annual
- Open access: Yes

Standard abbreviations
- ISO 4: Berkeley Stud.

Indexing
- ISSN: 1947-3737
- LCCN: 2009200254
- OCLC no.: 340916526

Links
- Journal homepage; Online access; Online archive

Berkeley Studies (Berkeley Newsletter until December 2007) is an annual on-line academic journal established in 1977. It publishes scholarly articles on anything related to George Berkeley. The journal also gives news of the last events in Berkeley scholarship: book reviews, information about coming pertinent conferences, and abstracts from reports delivered at such conferences. Assembling a bibliography on Berkeley constitutes an essential part of the editors' work.

The first issue of the journal was published by the Philosophy Department at Trinity College, Dublin. When Hampden-Sydney College hosted the journal's website in 2005, issues started to be published in the new format of an online journal. The previous issues were digitized and are available for free download in PDF format.

While publishing papers in English, the journal welcomes review articles on the reception of Berkeley's philosophy in non-English-speaking countries.

Berkeley Studies is sponsored by Florida State University and the International Berkeley Society, but editorial operations are independent from both. Long-term preservation of the journal is provided by the Philosophy Documentation Center.

== See also ==
- List of philosophy journals
