= Juha Sihvola =

Finnish philosopher and historian

Juha Sihvola (29 August 1957, Sippola – 14 June 2012, Helsinki) was a Finnish philosopher and historian. He was a university professor of general history from 2000, and part of The Academy of Finland's Centre of Excellence program upon Philosophical Psychology, Morality and Politics, serving as the deputy director of the Centre of Excellence from 2008. In the years 2004–2009, he was the Director of Helsinki Collegium for Advanced Studies.

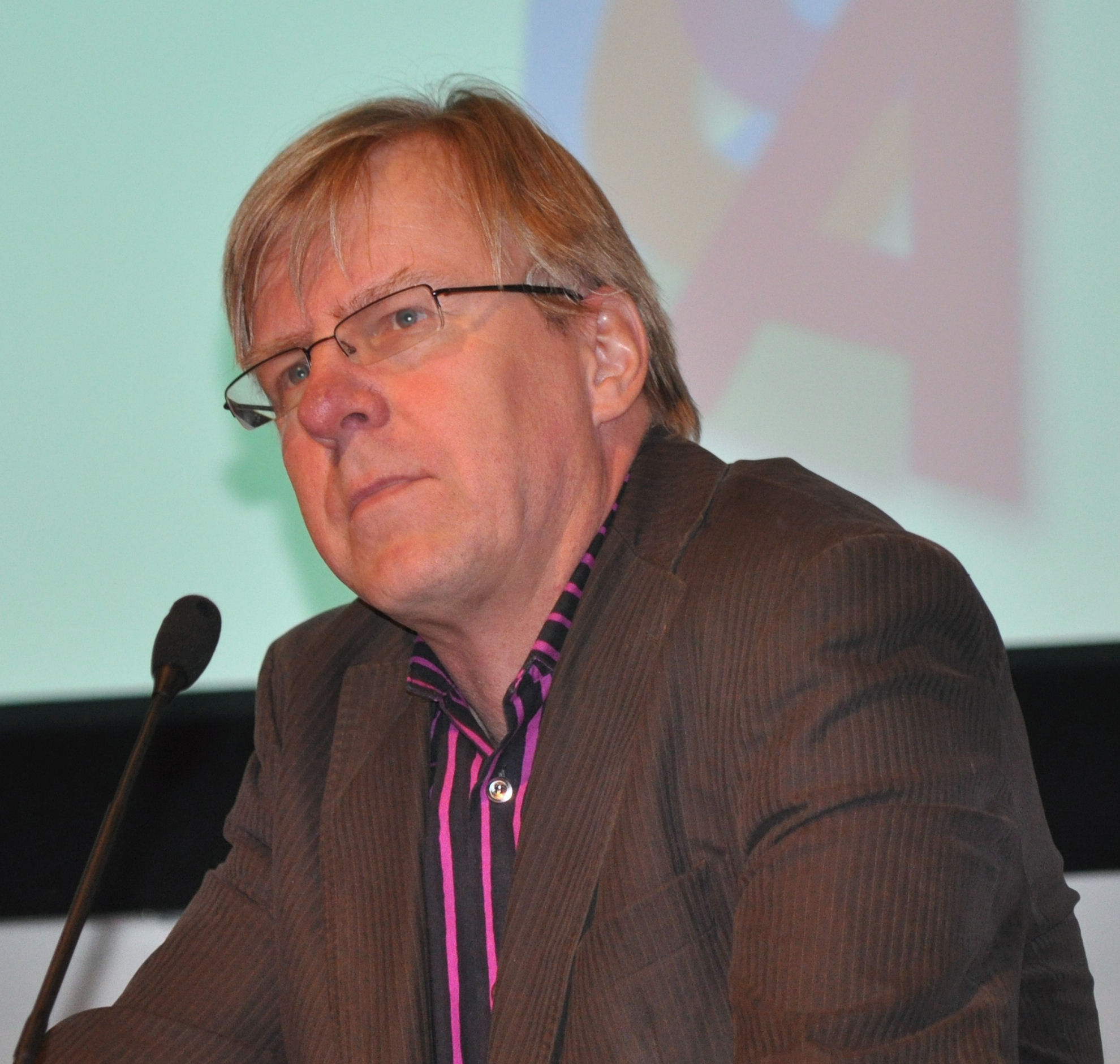
Juha Sihvola in 2009.

== Academic career ==
In 1989, Sihvola defended his doctoral dissertation (Doctor of Philosophy) at the University of Helsinki, a work on ancient Greek ethics and cultural philosophy entitled Decay, Progress, the Good Life? Hesiod and Protagoras on the Development of Culture. His supervisors were Simo Knuuttila, Holger Thesleff, Matti Viikari and Päivi Setälä. Sihvola worked as an Academy of Finland research assistant (1983–1988), junior researcher (1988–1994), and senior researcher (1995–2000). He also conducted research in Italy and the United States, where he was a visiting researcher at Brown University (1991–1992), as well as being a junior researcher at the Center for Hellenic Studies in Washington DC (1994–1995). Sihvola taught at the University of Jyväskylä and, amongst other things, at the University of Helsinki's history, philosophy, and systematic theology departments.

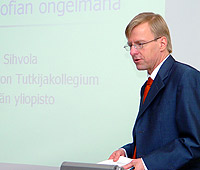
Juha Sihvola at the Finnish Ministry for Foreign Affairs, 2004

Sihvola worked, amongst other things, as the editor of Historiallinen Aikakauskirja (Historical Periodical) (2001–2005), a member of the Academy of Finland's Research Council for Culture and Society (2001–2006), as well as being a member of the board of Suomen Rooman Instituutin Säätiö (Foundation of the Finnish Historical Institute in Rome) (from 2004), serving as their chairperson from 2007.

Sihvola's studies dealt with, above all, the history of Ancient Philosophy and its influence upon subsequent philosophical thinking. Sihvola also applied creatively Aristotelian and Stoic philosophical ideas to current political and social debates. He discussed the investigation, among other things, of the good life, the ethics of global affairs, the ethics of foreign policy, gender, and the philosophy of religion. He wrote numerous speeches and articles in daily newspapers, in particular, the Helsingin Sanomat, and appeared on radio and television current affairs programs.

Sihvola conducted research in collaboration with Simo Knuuttila and the American philosopher Martha Nussbaum. He worked on two Knuuttila-led Academy of Finland Centres of Excellence, History of Mind (2002–2007) and Philosophical Psychology, Morality and Politics (deputy director, 2008–2012). Together with Nussbaum, Sihvola organized numerous international philosophical conferences from 1991. Sihvola was also Director of the Ministry of Foreign Affairs-funded research project on ethics in foreign policy (2004–2005).

Sihvola's most famous works include Toivon vuosituhat (The Millennium of Hope) (1998), which won the Vuoden Tiedekirja (The Science Book of the Year) Award, together with a work co-authored with Martha Nussbaum, The Sleep of Reason (2002), and also Maailmankansalaisen etiikka (Ethics of the Citizen of the World)(2004), which won the Lauri Jäntin Säätiö's book award. He also served in the Aristotlean Finnish translation group on the numerous works of Aristotle. His book Maailmankansalaisen uskonto (Beliefs of the Citizen of the World) appeared in 2011, and was selected as Christian book of 2011 in the Savon Sanomat.

Sihvola received the 2011 WSOY Literary Foundation Award.

The Board of the Academy of Finland named Sihvola as Academy Professor for 2012–2016. His project dealt with tolerance and pluralism in moral psychology, philosophy, history, and political philosophy.

== Private life ==
Sihvola was married to Kirsi Ahonen. The family has two children, Jaakko (born 1996) and Elina (born 1998). Sihvola's hobbies included long-distance running, literature, rock music and church activities. For several years, he was both their children's soccer coach at FC Viikingit. In the parish elections of 2010, Sihvola was the politically neutral candidate of "vapaamielisen Kirkon kevät-yhdistys". He collected the most votes of all the association's candidates and was elected with 85 votes in Vuosaari Parish Council and 116 votes in the Helsinki Parish Union Church of the common council in 2011. He died of a serious illness on 14 June 2012.

== Awards ==
- WSOY Literary Foundation Award
- Christian book of 2011(Maailmankansalaisen uskonto)

== Works ==
- Decay, Progress, the Good Life? Hesiod and Protagoras on the Development of Culture (1989)
- Seppä, Tuomas & Hietaniemi, Tapani & Mikkeli, Heikki & Sihvola, Juha (Ed.): Historian alku: Historianfilosofia, aatehistoria, maailmanhistoria. Tutkijaliiton julkaisusarja 74. Helsinki: Tutkijaliitto, 1993. ISBN 951-9297-91-X.
- Hyvän elämän politiikka: Näkökulmia Aristoteleen poliittiseen filosofiaan. Tutkijaliiton julkaisusarja 76. Helsinki: Tutkijaliitto, 1994. ISBN 951-9297-94-4.
- Thesleff, Holger & Sihvola, Juha: Antiikin filosofia ja aatemaailma. Porvoo: WSOY, 1994. ISBN 951-0-19930-3.
- Kaimio, Maarit & Aronen, Jaakko & Sihvola, Juha (Ed.): Väkivalta antiikin kulttuurissa. Helsinki: Gaudeamus, 1998. ISBN 951-662-737-4.
- Toivon vuosituhat: Eurooppalainen ihmiskuva ja suomalaisen yhteiskunnan tulevaisuus. Sitra 185. Jyväskylä: Atena, 1998. ISBN 951-796-133-2.
- The Emotions in Hellenistic Philosophy (Ed. Juha Sihvola & Troels Engberg-Pedersen 1998)
- Ancient Scepticism and the Sceptical Tradition (Ed. Juha Sihvola 2000)
- Yksilönä yhteisössä: Näkökulmia paikallisuuteen, globalisaatioon ja hyvään elämään. Kunnallisalan kehittämissäätiön Polemia-sarja nro 37. Helsinki: Kunnallisalan kehittämissäätiö, 2000. ISBN 952-9740-72-7.
- Sihvola, Juha; Nussbaum, Martha (2002). The sleep of reason: erotic experience and sexual ethics in ancient Greece and Rome. Chicago: University of Chicago Press. ISBN 9780226609157.
- Villa Lante: Suomen Rooman Instituutti 1954–2004 (Päivi Setälä, Liisa Suvikumpu, Juha Sihvola & Timo Keinänen 2004)
- Maailmankansalaisen etiikka. Helsingissä: Otava, 2004 (3. painos 2005). ISBN 951-1-18364-8.
- Niiniluoto, Ilkka & Sihvola, Juha (Ed.): Nykyajan etiikka: Keskusteluja ihmisestä ja yhteisöstä. Helsinki: Gaudeamus, 2005. ISBN 951-662-939-3.
- Remes, Pauliina & Sihvola, Juha (Ed.): Ancient Philosophy of the Self. Springer, 2008. ISBN 1402085958.
- Niiniluoto, Ilkka & Sihvola, Juha (Ed.): Tarkemmin ajatellen: Kansakunnan henkinen tila. Helsinki: Gaudeamus, 2008. ISBN 978-952-495-088-6.
- Maailmankansalaisen uskonto. Helsingissä: Otava, 2011. ISBN 978-951-1-21279-9.
