= Tarja Knuuttila =

Finnish philosopher of science

Tarja Knuuttila is a Finnish philosopher of science. She is a professor of philosophy of science at the University of Vienna.

== Research ==
Much of Knuuttila's research concerns the epistemology of scientific modelling, the relation of scientific models to the real world, and the connection between simplicity and generality of models, with varied fields of application including ecology, economics, and engineering. She is also the principal investigator of the Possible Life project of the European Research Council, which studies the philosophy of hypothetical types of biochemistry including synthetic biology and astrobiology.

== Education and career ==
After working as a financial analyst for the Bank of Finland and Finnish State Guarantee Fund, beginning in 1985, Knuuttila studied economics at the Helsinki School of Economics, earning a master's degree in 1991, and became a financial consultant for business and non-profit organizations. Motivated by the realization that many economic models are based on untrue assumptions, she left this work in 1999 to become a graduate student in philosophy at the University of Helsinki. She earned a second master's degree in 2001, and finished her Ph.D. in 2005. Her dissertation was Models as Epistemic Artefacts: Towards a Non-Representationalist Account of Scientific Representation.

She remained at the University of Helsinki as a postdoctoral researcher, with support from the Academy of Finland, and earned a habilitation there in 2010, continuing through 2014 as a university researcher and fellow of the Helsinki Collegium for Advanced Studies. In 2013 she took a position at the University of South Carolina as a tenured associate professor, and in 2018 she took her present position as a full professor at the University of Vienna.

== Recognition ==
Knuuttila was elected to the Academia Europaea in 2021.
