= Ilkka Niiniluoto =

Finnish philosopher and mathematician

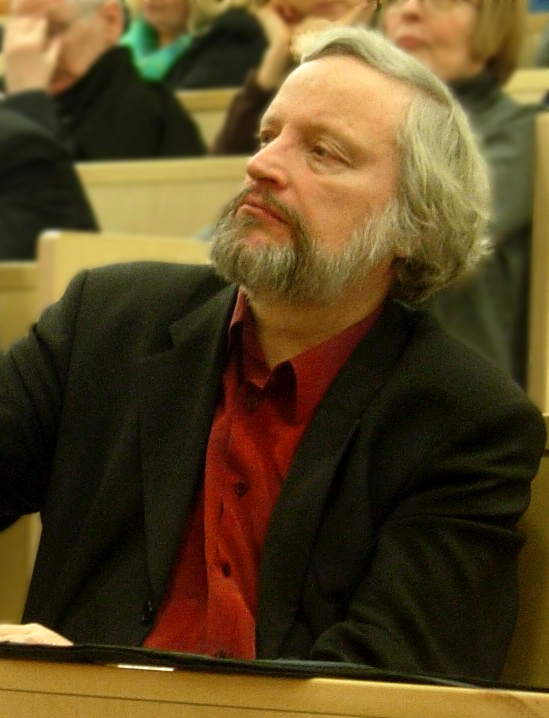
- Niiniluoto listening to a debate in 2007
- Born: Ilkka Maunu Olavi Niiniluoto; 12 March 1946 (age 80); Helsinki, Finland
- Education: University of Helsinki (PhD, 1974)
- Known for: Critical scientific realism
- Awards: Order of the White Star
- Scientific career
- Workplaces: University of Helsinki

Ilkka Maunu Olavi Niiniluoto (born 12 March 1946) is a Finnish philosopher and mathematician, serving as a professor of philosophy at the University of Helsinki since 1981. He was appointed as rector of the University of Helsinki on 1 August 2003 for five years. On 25 April 2008, he was chosen to succeed Kari Raivio as chancellor of the University of Helsinki, beginning 1 June 2008.

== Work ==
A significant contribution to the philosophy of science, particularly to the topic of verisimilitude or truth approximation, is his Truthlikeness (Synthese Library, Springer, 1987). Another notable publication is Critical Scientific Realism (Oxford University Press, 2002).

In the 1990s, Niiniluoto among other university employees organized a plea to the consistory of the university to abolish ecclesiastic remnants from the university ceremonies.

Ilkka Niiniluoto is editor-in-chief of Acta Philosophica Fennica, the leading philosophical journal of Finland.

From 2008 to 2013, he served as the Chancellor of the University of Helsinki.

In 2011 he gave a Turku Agora Lecture.

== Books ==
- Niiniluoto, Ilkka; Woleński, Jan; Sintonen, Matti (2004). Handbook of epistemology. Dordrecht Boston: Kluwer Academic Publishers. ISBN 9781402019852.
