= Hilja Haapala =

Finnish writer

- Born: Hilja Dagmar Janhonen; 14 January 1877; Jyväskylä, Finland
- Died: 26 August 1958 (aged 81); Jyväskylä, Finland

Hilja Haapala, (Hilja Dagmar Janhonen) (14 January 1877 in Jyväskylä – 26 August 1958 in Jyväskylä) was a Finnish writer.

== Books ==
=== Under the name of Hilja Janhonen ===
- Ristiriitoja. Oulu 1936
- Panettelu on käärme. Oulu 1956
- Lapsipuolen asemassa. Oulu 1958

=== Under name of Hilja Haapala ===
- Isien tähden: romaani vuosisadanvaihteen Suomesta. Oulu 1925, 2nd ed. Marjamaa, Oulu 1949
- Koivulan häpäisijä: romaani vuosisadanvaihteen Suomesta. H. W. Marjamaan Publ., Oulu 1925, 2nd 1927, 3rd ed. Marjamaa & kumpp., Oulu 1948
- Tummanpunainen ruusu 1. H. W. Marjamaan Publ., Oulu 1926, 2nd ed. under title Tummanpunainen ruusu, Marjamaa, Oulu 1951
- Tummanpunainen ruusu 2: Hallovan Inkeri-rouva. H. W. Marjamaan Publ., Oulu 1926, 2nd ed. under title Hallovan Inkeri-rouva, Marjamaa, Oulu 1952
- Sovitus. H. W. Marjamaan Publ., Oulu 1928
- Tahrattu morsiuskruunu Marjamaa, Oulu 1930, 2nd ed. 1952
- Viettelijä. Marjamaa, Oulu 1930
- Suojelusenkelini. Marjamaa, Oulu 1949
- Äidin perintö Marjamaa, Oulu 1956
- Miksi hän joi?. Finnish Republican Printing Co, Calumet, Michigan
