= Eino Kaila =

Finnish philosopher

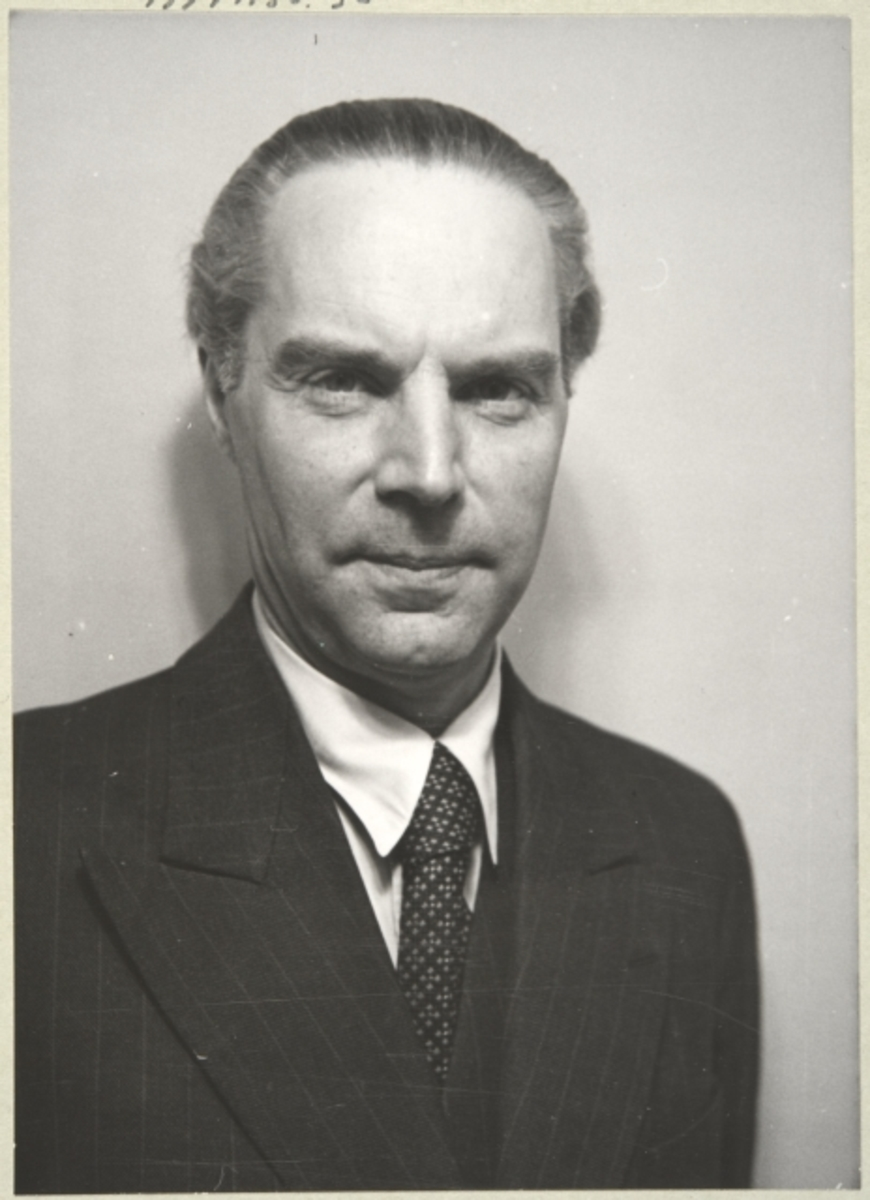
Eino Kaila in 1951

Eino Sakari Kaila (8 August 1890 – 31 July 1958) was a Finnish philosopher, critic and teacher. He worked in numerous fields including psychology (sometimes considered to be the founder of Finnish psychology), physics and theater, and attempted to find unifying principles behind various branches of human and natural sciences.

== Life ==
Eino Kaila was born in Alajärvi, Finland. Kaila's father, Erkki Kaila, was a Protestant minister and later archbishop. He graduated from the University of Helsinki in 1910. In the 1920s he worked in the field of literary criticism and psychology as a professor at the University of Turku and is said to have been the first to introduce gestalt psychology to Finland. He was a part of the cultural circles of the time with the likes of Jean Sibelius and Frans Eemil Sillanpää. In 1916 he married the painter Anna Lovisa Snellman, who was granddaughter of Johan Vilhelm Snellman. He had University positions as lecturer in Helsinki and professor in Turku, and in 1930 he was appointed professor of theoretical philosophy at the University of Helsinki. In the 1930s, Kaila was closely associated with the Vienna Circle.

During World War II, Kaila lectured in Germany. In 1948 Kaila became a member of the Finnish Academy. He died in Kirkkonummi on 31 July 1958.

== Ideas ==
Despite being greatly influenced by the logical positivists and critical of unempirical speculation, an aspect common to all of Kaila's work was in strive for a holistic, almost pantheistic understanding of things. He also maintained a more naturalist approach to psychology. His book Persoonallisuus (Personality, 1934) was a psychological study with philosophical dimensions, in which emphasized the biological nature of psychological phenomena. During the last years of his life he attempted to construct a philosophical theory of everything in Terminalkausalität als die Grundlage eines unitarischen Naturbegriffs (1956), but this, what was meant to be the first installment in a more extensive study, was not met with much enthusiasm outside of Finland.

Though he withdrew his support of the National Socialists before the end of the Second World War, he wrote about the differences between "western" and "eastern" thought and claimed that the homogeneity of the people was a necessity for a functioning democracy. After the war his close friendships with Edwin Linkomies and Veikko Antero Koskenniemi put a political shadow even over Kaila.

== Influence ==
Kaila's most famous pupil was Georg Henrik von Wright, who was the successor of Ludwig Wittgenstein at the University of Cambridge. The tradition of highly German-influenced analytical-idealist philosophy which Kaila championed remained unchallenged in Finnish philosophy until the appearance of continental influences in the 1980s.

Kaila founded the psychological laboratory at the University of Helsinki, and educated the next generation of psychologists. He contributed to founding professorship in psychology, and to establishment of the Faculty of Political Science together with Edwin Linkomies.

== Notable works ==
- 1930. Der Logistische Neupositivismus: Eine kritische Studie English translation by Ann and Peter Kirschenmann "Logistic Neopositivism: A critical study" in Reality and Experience: Four Philosophical Essays, 1979, D. Reidel Publishing Company. ISBN 978-90-277-0919-6
- 1934. Persoonallisuus (Personality) 8th edition, 1982, Helsinki: Otava. ISBN 952-99366-6-4
- 1936. Über das System der Wirklichkeitsbegriffe: Ein Beitrag zum logische Empirismus English translation by Ann and Peter Kirschenmann "On the System of the Concepts of Reality: A contribution to logical empiricism" in Reality and Experience: Four Philosophical Essays, 1979, D. Reidel Publishing Company. ISBN 978-90-277-0919-6
- 1939. Inhimillinen tieto: Mitä se on ja mitä se ei ole English translation by Anssi Korhonen Human Knowledge: A Classic Statement of Logical Empiricism, 2014, Open Court. ISBN 978-0-8126-9848-0
- 1941. Über den physikalischen Realitätsbegriff: Zweiter Beitrag zum logischen Empirismus English translation by Ann and Peter Kirschenmann "On the Concept of Reality in Physical Science: Second contribution to logical empiricism" in Reality and Experience: Four Philosophical Essays, 1979, D. Reidel Publishing Company. ISBN 978-90-277-0919-6
- 1943. Syvähenkinen elämä: Keskusteluja viimeisistä kysymyksistä (Deep-Spiritual Life: Conversations on Final Questions) 3rd edition, 1985, Helsinki: Otava. ISBN 951-37-1741-0
- 1956. Terminalkausalität Als Die Grundlage Eines Unitarischen Naturbegriffs
- 1960. Die perzeptuellen und konzeptuellen Komponenten der Alltagserfahrung English translation by Ann and Peter Kirschenmann "The Perceptual and Conceptual Components of Everyday Experience" in Reality and Experience: Four Philosophical Essays, 1979, D. Reidel Publishing Company. ISBN 978-90-277-0919-6
