= Acta Philosophica Fennica =

- Discipline: Philosophy
- Language: English
- Edited by: Leila Haaparanta

Publication details
- History: 1935–present
- Publisher: Philosophical Society of Finland (Finland)
- Frequency: Irregular

Standard abbreviations
- ISO 4: Acta Philos. Fenn.

Indexing
- ISSN: 0355-1792
- OCLC no.: 1460971

Links
- Journal homepage

Acta Philosophica Fennica is a peer-reviewed academic journal published by the Philosophical Society of Finland.

The journal was established in 1935. From 1968 to 1981 it was distributed by North-Holland Publishing (Amsterdam, now Elsevier), and since 1981 by the Academic Bookstore (Helsinki). The Acta Philosophica Fennica covers all areas of philosophy. Originally, the journal was published in German, but nowadays the articles are in English.

The current editor in chief is Leila Haaparanta (University of Helsinki).

== See also ==
- List of philosophy journals
