= Raili Kauppi =

Raili Kauppi (1920–1995) was a professor of philosophy at the University of Tampere, and an internationally recognized scholar of Leibniz and intensional logic.

== Main publications ==
- Über die Leibnizsche Logik mit besonderer Berücksichtigung des Problems der Intension und Extension, Acta Philosophia Fennica, Fasc. XII, Helsinki, 1960.
- Einführung in die Theorie der Begriffsysteme, Acta Universitatis Tamperensis, Ser A, vol 15, Tampere, 1967.
