= Elina (given name) =

Female given name

- Gender: Feminine

Origin
- Meaning: Estonian, Finnish, and Swedish variant of Helen

Elina is a feminine given name in various languages. It is often considered a form of Helen in different languages such as Estonian, Finnish, and Swedish. Eliina is an alternate Estonian and Finnish spelling. Elina was also the name of an ancient Greek city in the Epirus region that took its name from the Elinoi tribe.

Notable people with the name include:

- Elina Arai (born 1989), American–born Japanese reporter
- Elina Avanesyan (born 2001), Russian–Armenian tennis player
- Elīna Babkina (born 1989), Latvian basketball player
- Elina Bardach-Yalov (born 1982), Russian–born Israeli politician
- Elina Berglund (born 1984), Swedish entrepreneur and particle physicist
- Elina Björklund (born 1970), Finnish business executive
- Elina Born (born 1994), Estonian singer
- Elīna Ieva Bota (born 2000), Latvian luger
- Elina Bystritskaya (1928–2019), Russian actress
- Elina Colomer (1922–1987), Argentine actress
- Elina Danielian (born 1976), Armenian chess player
- Elina Duni (born 1981), Swiss–Albanian singer
- Elina Eggers (born 1987), Swedish diver
- Elina Fuhrman (born 1969), Russian–American journalist
- Elīna Garanča (born 1976), Latvian opera singer
- Elina Gasanova (born 1989), Azerbaijani–born Russian tennis player
- Elina Gismeeva (1992–2019), Russian kickboxer
- Elina Goidina (born 2010), Estonian figure skater
- Elina González Acha de Correa Morales (1861–1942), Argentine activist, educator, and scientist
- Elina Gravin (born 2007), Swedish gymnast
- Elina Groberman (born 1983), Moldovan–born American chess player
- Elina Guimarães (1904–1991), Portuguese writer
- Elina Gunawardena (born 2006), Sri Lankan fashion model
- Elina Guseva (born 1964), Azerbaijani–Russian handball player
- Elina Gustafsson (born 1992), Finnish boxer
- Elina Haavio-Mannila (1933–2025), Finnish professor and scientist
- Elina Hänninen, Finnish figure skater
- Elina Hemminki (born 1948), Finnish academic
- Elina Hirvonen (born 1975), Finnish writer
- Elina Jayewardene (1913–2007), Sri Lankan politician
- Elina Johansson (born 1986), Swedish footballer
- Elina Kahla (born 1960), Finnish academic, author, and philologist
- Elina Kallionidou (born 1998), Greek mixed martial artist
- Elina Karjalainen (1927–2006), Finnish author and journalist
- Elina Kechicheva, Bulgarian photographer
- Elina Kettunen (born 1981), Finnish figure skater
- Elina Khozlu (born 1971), Soviet and Ukrainian rhythmic gymnast
- Elina Knihtilä (born 1971), Finnish actress
- Elina Konstantopoulou (born 1970), Greek singer
- Elina Labourdette (1919–2014), French actress
- Elina Lampela (born 1998), Finnish pole vaulter
- Elina Linna (born 1947), Swedish politician
- Elina Löwensohn (born 1966), Romanian–American actress
- Elina Madison (born 1976), American actress
- Elina Mikhina (born 1994), Kazakh sprinter
- Elina Mitrofanova (born 1992), Russian ice hockey player
- Elina Miyake Jackson, Japanese–born Canadian actress
- Elina Mizuno (born 1993), Japanese actress and dancer
- Elina Mottram (1903–1996), Australian architect
- Elina Narváez, Ecuadorian politician
- Elina Nasaudrodro (born 1985), Fijian judoka
- Elina Nechayeva (born 1991), Estonian opera singer
- Elina Nummenpää (born 1983), Finnish golfer
- Elina Pähklimägi (born 1983), Estonian actress
- Elina Partõka (born 1983), Estonian swimmer
- Elina Pienimäki-Hietamäki (born 1976), Finnish cross-country skier
- Elina Pohjanpää (1933–1996), Finnish actress
- Elina Reinold (born 1971), Estonian actress
- Elina Ribakova, Latvian economist
- Elīna Ringa (born 1980), Latvian pole vaulter
- Elina Risku (born 1992), Finnish speed skater
- Elina Maria Rodríguez (born 1997), Argentine volleyball player
- Elina Saksa (born 2000), Finnish golfer
- Elina Salo (1936–2025), Finnish actress
- Elina Samantray (born 1996), Indian actress
- Elina Schumacher (born 1999), German politician
- Elina Shammi, Bangladeshi actress
- Elina Sheremey (born 2006), Swedish rhythmic gymnast
- Elina Shirazi, Iranian–American journalist and reporter
- Elina Siirala (born 1983), Finnish soprano and vocal coach
- Elina Sofokleous (born 1978), Cypriot cyclist
- Elina Stary (born 2006), Austrian Para alpine skier
- Elina Svitolina (born 1994), Ukrainian tennis player
- Elina Syrjälä (born 1982), Finnish footballer
- Elina Tzengko (born 2002), Greek javelin thrower
- Elina Vähälä (born 1975), Finnish violinist
- Elina Valtonen (born 1981), Finnish politician
- Elina Vaseva (born 1986), Bulgarian wrestler
- Elīna Vihrova (born 2002), Latvian artistic gymnast
- Elina Virtaala (born 1965), Finnish curler and coach
- Elina Zilliox (born 2005), French ice hockey player
- Elina Zúñiga, Argentine immunologist
