= Björklund =

Björklund or Bjørklund or Bjorklund is a surname of Swedish and Norwegian origin. Notable people with the surname include:

== Björklund ==
- Anders Björklund (born 1945), Swedish neuroscientist
- August Björklund (born 2002), Finnish footballer
- Benjamin Björklund (born 1986), Swedish painter
- Elina Björklund (born 1970), Finnish business executive
- Elsa Björklund (1895–1970), Swedish swimmer
- Eva Björklund (born 1942), Swedish politician
- Frank Björklund (born 1960), Swedish surrealist artist
- Gustafva Björklund (1794–1862), Swedish writer
- Heléne Björklund (born 1972), Swedish politician
- Henrik Björklund (born 1990), Swedish ice hockey player
- Hugo Björklund (1885–1963), Swedish wrestler
- Ingeborg Björklund (1897–1974), Swedish poet and author
- Irina Björklund (born 1973), Finnish actress and singer
- Jan Björklund (born 1962), Swedish politician
- Jens Björklund (1910–2000), Swedish weightlifter
- Joachim Björklund (born 1971), Swedish footballer
- Joakim "Jock-E" Björklund (born 1965), Swedish musician
- Jonathan Björklund (born 1994), Swedish ice hockey player
- Kalle Björklund (footballer, born 1999) (born 1999), Swedish footballer
- Karl-Gunnar Björklund (born 1953), Swedish footballer
- Kristoffer Björklund (born 1978), Swedish footballer
- Lars-Gunnar Björklund (1937–2012), Swedish sports journalist
- Leni Björklund (born 1944), Swedish politician
- Lotta Björklund (born 1969), Swedish politician
- Lukas Björklund (born 2004), Swedish footballer
- Maggie Björklund (born 2000), Musical artist
- Michael Björklund (born 1975), Finnish chef
- Mirjam Björklund (born 1998), Swedish tennis player
- Olle Björklund (1916–1981), Swedish actor and television host
- Rolf Björklund (canoeist) (born 1937), Finnish sprint canoer
- Rolf Björklund (footballer) (born 1938), Swedish footballer
- Timothy Björklund (born 2000), American artist
- Ulrika Björklund (born 1967), Swedish politician

== Bjørklund ==
- Amund Bjørklund (born 1975), Musical artist
- Geir Bjørklund (born 1969), Norwegian science writer
- Herman Bjørklund (1883–1960), Norwegian tennis player
- Ivar Bjørklund (1949–2026), Norwegian anthropologist and writer
- Kjetil Bjørklund (born 1967), Norwegian politician
- Terje Bjørklund (1945–2024), Norwegian jazz pianist and composer
- Thor Bjørklund (1889–1975), Norwegian inventor

== Bjorklund ==
- Angie Bjorklund (born 1989), American basketball player
- Arnold L. Bjorklund (1918–1979), United States Army Medal of Honor recipient
- Blake Bjorklund (born 1985), American stock car racing driver
- Bob Bjorklund (1918–1994), American football player
- David F. Bjorklund (born 1949), American professor of psychology
- Garry Bjorklund (born 1951), American middle- and long-distance runner
- Gary C. Bjorklund, American physicist
- Hank Bjorklund (born 1950), American football player
- Lynn Bjorklund (born 1957), American long-distance runner
- Steve Bjorklund (born 1960), American singer
