= Elina =

Elina may refer to:

- Elina (butterfly), a genus of butterflies in the family Nymphalidae
- Elina (Epirus), an ancient Greek fortified town in the region of Epirus
- Elina (given name), a feminine given name
- Elina, protagonist of the Barbie: Fairytopia series of animated films
- Elina: As If I Wasn't There, a 2002 Swedish film
- Abrigo de Santa Elina, an archaeological site in Mato Grosso, Brazil
