= Carla V. Rothlin =

Argentinian immunologist

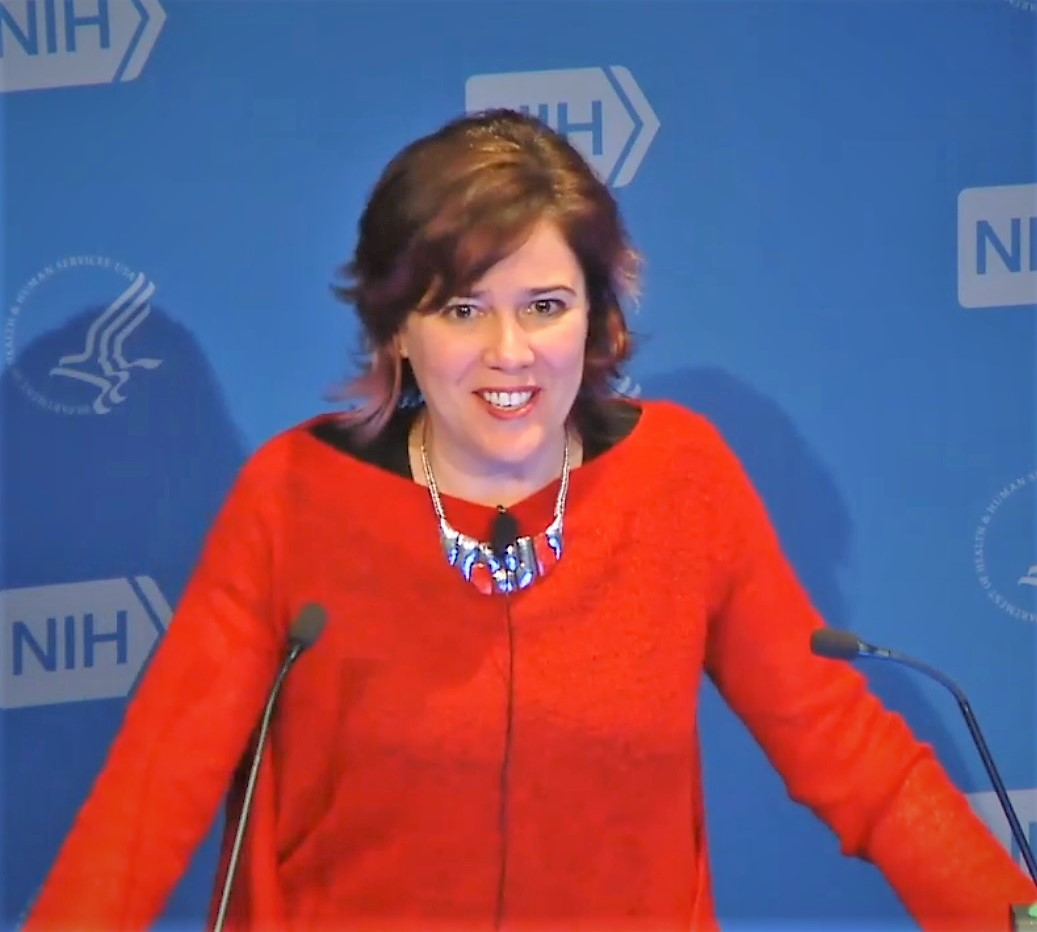
- Rothlin speaks at the National Institutes of Health in 2018
- Born: Buenos Aires, Argentina
- Education: University of Buenos Aires; Salk Institute for Biological Studies
- Known for: Role of TAM receptor tyrosine kinases in immune homeostasis
- Awards: Howard Hughes Medical Institute Faculty Scholar, Early Excellence Award – American Asthma Foundation, Pew Foundation Fellow
- Scientific career
- Fields: Immunology
- Workplaces: Yale University; Yale Cancer Center

Carla V. Rothlin is an Argentinian immunologist. She is a professor of immunobiology at Yale University, where she holds the Dorys McConnell Duberg Professorship, and also serves as a professor of pharmacology. Rothlin is the co-leader of the Cancer Immunology Program at Yale Cancer Center and a Howard Hughes Medical Investigator Faculty Scholar.

Rothlin studies the mechanisms that regulate immune homeostasis and wound repair, with specific interests in cell death recognition, immune checkpoints, and cellular crosstalk in the context of injury and cell turnover. She has made fundamental discoveries about the roles of TAM receptors tyrosine kinase and their ligands in the regulation of inflammation. Rothlin is also a co-founder of the Global Immunotalks, a weekly series of virtual lectures on recent immunological research, which began in 2020.

== Early life and education ==
Rothlin grew up in Buenos Aires, Argentina. She was one of four daughters, raised by her mother, a physician, and her father, a pharmacology researcher. From a young age, she was surrounded by laboratory science and clinical cases.

After high school, Rothlin earned both her undergraduate and graduate degrees in biochemistry from the University of Buenos Aires. She was mentored by Ana Belén Elgoyhen and studied the biochemical properties of the nicotinic acetylcholine receptors in the inner ear. Her work helped further scientific understanding of how efferent cholinergic fibers and inner ear hair cells communicate information from the brain back to the ear to mediate sensory tuning.

Rothlin completed her graduate studies in 2002 and moved to San Diego, California, for her postdoctoral work under Greg Lemke at the Salk Institute for Biological Studies. There, she became fascinated by TAM receptors, which Lemke had discovered in the 1990s, and their roles in immune homeostasis. This interest led her to focus on immunology in her postdoctoral research.

During her postdoctoral studies, Rothlin was part of a team that discovered the role of TAM receptor tyrosine kinases—Tyro3, Axl, and MerTk—in regulating inflammation. They found that these receptors inhibit Toll-like receptor (TLR) signaling and TLR-induced cytokine cascades in the innate immune response. Specifically, cytokine-dependent TAM signaling is upregulated by type I interferon-STAT1 signaling, leading to the expression of cytokine and TLR suppressors. This process acts as a negative feedback loop in inflammation.

== Career and research ==
In 2009, Rothlin was recruited to Yale University, where she started a lab with her partner from Salk, Sourav Ghosh. Rothlin became an Assistant Professor of Immunobiology at Yale, and in 2016, she joined the faculty of the Howard Hughes Medical Institute. In 2018, Rothlin became the Director of Graduate Studies in Immunobiology at Yale. In 2019, she was appointed the Dorys McConnell Duberg Professor of Immunobiology. She is also a Professor of Pharmacology, a member of the Yale Cancer Center, and the Co-Leader of the Cancer Immunology Program at Yale.

Rothlin is a co-director of the Rothlin Ghosh Lab, which focuses on exploring the mechanisms of immune regulation and homeostasis. The Rothlin Ghosh Lab has made critical discoveries regarding TAM receptor tyrosine kinases, their ligands, and the roles their interactions play as innate immune checkpoints in regulating the immune response. They have specifically found that TAM receptors help inhibit the innate immune response, that the TAM ligand protein S can mediate the ability of T cells to limit dendritic cell activation, and their roles in controlling type 2 immunity and the phagocytosis of apoptotic cells.

=== TAM receptors and immune homeostasis ===
Rothlin and her team discovered a mechanism by which the adaptive immune system helps regulate chronic inflammation through the control of dendritic cells (DCs). They found that T cells produce the TAM ligand protein S, which acts on TAM receptors on DCs to limit their activation. When they knocked out the Pros1 gene, which encodes protein S, in T cells, they observed an enhanced immune response and increased colitis. They further demonstrated that this mechanism of immune regulation is conserved in humans.

Additionally, they showed how viruses can exploit TAM-mediated immune regulation to avoid destruction. They found that viruses coated with TAM ligands activate TAMs on dendritic cells, which limits interferon signaling and helps the viruses evade immune responses and enable replication. Since inhibiting TAM receptors can promote resistance to infection, this could be used as a therapeutic target for viral diseases. In 2015, Rothlin's group characterized MERTK as a potent inhibitor of T cell activation through its interactions with the Pros1 ligand in humans.

=== Innate immune checkpoints in cancer ===
Rothlin's lab also explores the role TAMs play in cellular immunology and innate immune checkpoints in cancer. Historically, immune checkpoint blockade therapy has focused on the adaptive immune system, targeting cellular braking systems on T cells (such as CTLA-4 and PD-1 inhibitors) to enhance the immunogenicity of the tumor microenvironment and cytotoxicity of tumor-infiltrating cells. Rothlin and her team are working upstream of T cell exhaustion markers, targeting the innate immune system checkpoints that involve TAMs. Since Rothlin has found that TAMs mediate repair and regrowth aspects of the innate immune response, blocking these molecules holds promise for keeping the immune system in an inflammatory or defensive state to promote anti-tumor immunity.

In collaboration with Miriam Merad's group, Rothlin and her team found that Axl signalling induces the expression of PD-L1 on dendritic cells in the tumor microenvironment, supporting the TAM receptor pathway as an upstream target for immunotherapy. In 2017, Rothlin and her team further elucidated the roles of Axl in tumor growth. They found that Axl expression is upregulated in colorectal cancer and that limiting Axl expression prevented tumor cell migration and invasion. They also discovered that Axl plays a role in B cell migration to tertiary lymphoid structures in cancer, and that blocking Axl signaling limits B cell migration.

== Scientific outreach ==
Rothlin aims to improve the scientific community through her leadership roles and outreach projects. She is a committee member of the Minority Affairs Committee for the American Association of Immunologists and serves as a senior editor for Immunology and Inflammation at eLife.

Rothlin is also the co-founder of the Global Immunotalks Lectures, which she started in 2020 with her colleague, friend, and fellow immunologist Elina Zúñiga. The initiative aims to make cutting-edge immunology accessible to a global audience without the need for travel. Every Wednesday, Rothlin and Zúñiga invite a renowned immunologist to share their latest findings with a global audience via Zoom. The talks are recorded and posted on YouTube.

Rothlin and Zúñiga were motivated to create these talks to increase access to the latest discoveries in an egalitarian manner, recognizing that not everyone has access to seminars and conferences. The Global Immunotalks proved highly successful in bringing people together virtually during the COVID-19 pandemic, and the series continued into 2021 due to its success.

== Awards and honors ==
- 2020 Career Enhancement Program and Developmental Research Program Awards
- 2016 Howard Hughes Medical Institute Faculty Scholar
- 2011 Early Excellence Award – American Asthma Foundation
- 2011 Novel Research Grant – Lupus Research Institute
- 2010 Senior Research Award – Crohn's and Colitis Foundation of America
- 2008 Special Fellow – Leukemia and Lymphoma Society
- 2008 Scientist Development Award – American Heart Association
- 2002 Pew Foundation Fellow
- 2002 Bernardo Houssay Award – Sociedad Argentina de Biologia
