= Viby Church, Närke =

Church in Sweden

Coordinates: 59°3′37.3″N 14°52′16.5″E

Viby Church
- Viby Kyrka
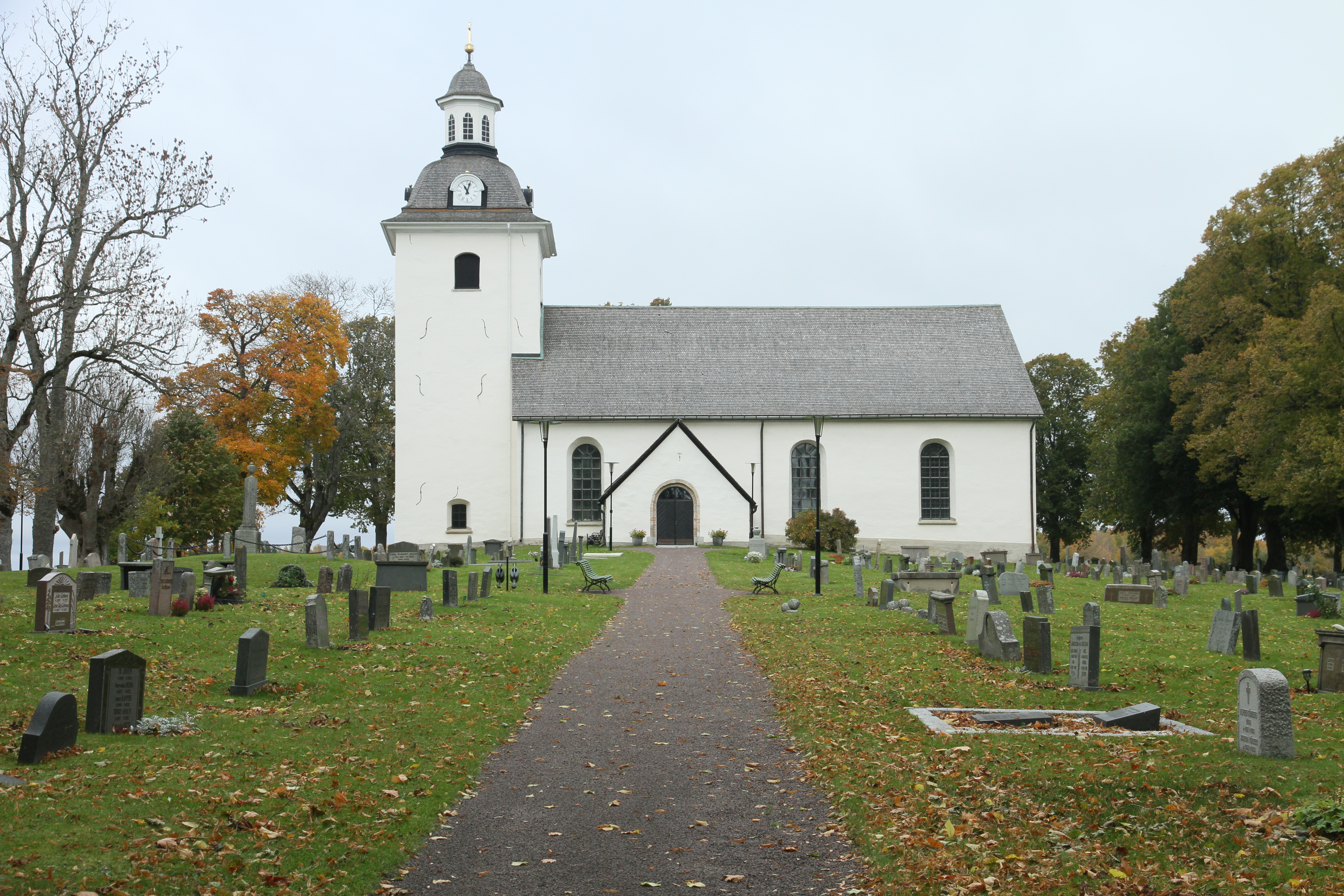
- Southern view of Viby Church
- Viby Church
- Location: Hallsberg, Örebro
- Address: Viby By Kyrkan 150
- Country: Sweden
- Denomination: Church of Sweden
- Previous denomination: Catholic Church
- Website: www.vibyforsamling.se

Architecture
- Functional status: Active
- Years built: 13th Century

Administration
- Diocese: Strängnäs

Clergy
- Priest(s): Benjamin Lundqvist; Torbjörn Edebol

Viby Church (Swedish: Viby Kyrka) is an evangelical lutheran church located in the Hallsberg Municipality, Sweden.

== History ==
It's unknown exactly when the church began its construction and when it was finished due to a fire that led to the destruction of many documents in 1720 but it's believed to have been around the 13th century.

From 1763 to 1772 the church was taking the shape of which we have today, the sacristy was renovated and the current bell tower had been built. The building also had some other minor renovations in the 1800 and 1900s such as a new white exterior, larger windows and a new interior.

In 2023, a significant conflict emerged within the Viby parish council when the hiring of a new assistant pastor, who refused to officiate same-sex weddings, sparked internal dissent. Ulrika Björklund, a council member, opposed the appointment, citing equality concerns. Her protest reflects ongoing debates within the Church of Sweden about inclusivity, as same-sex couples are officially permitted to marry within the church but priests are not required to perform such ceremonies. The head pastor, Benjamin Lundqvist, defended the hiring, emphasizing that all parish procedures were followed. In contrast, Björklund ultimately left the council and the church, expressing that she could not align with a parish that upheld discriminatory practices. Viby parish’s stance contrasts sharply with nearby Örebro parish, which has embraced LGBTQIA inclusion, earning certification for its commitment. According to Örebro’s head pastor, Anders Lennartsson, the parish proudly officiates same-sex marriages and annually participates in Pride events, reflecting its dedication to equality. Lennartsson emphasized that everyone is welcome in the majority of all churches and that the case of Viby parish is an exception. Later the same year, the church experienced a record number of thefts of copper gutters and downpipes, with no apparent way to stop future attempts.

== Viby Rectory ==
Viby rectory (Swedish: Viby Prästgård) is a located in Lundby, about 2 km (1.2 miles) away from Viby Church. The current rectory was built in the 1800s with a total of 11 rectors throughout its lifetime. The current rector, since 2005, is Viby Church's vicar and head pastor, Benjamin Lundqvist.
