= Alva Svennbeck =

Swedish gymnast (born 2000)

- Born: October 11, 2000 (age 25) Borje, Sweden

Gymnastics career
- Discipline: Rhythmic gymnastics
- Country represented: Sweden; (2019-2023)
- Club: GF Uppsalaflickorna
- Head coach: Katarina Jonsson Soderberg
Medal record
Representing Sweden
Event	1st	2nd	3rd
Nordic Championships	0	0	1
Total	0	0	1

Alva Svennbeck (born 11 October 2000) is a Swedish former individual rhythmic gymnast. She was a four-time Swedish national champion and now works as a coach and engineer.

== Personal life ==
Svennbeck has two younger brothers, twins, who also train in gymnastics. She studied civil engineering at Hermods AB and graduated in 2023.

In 2021, she won the Uppsala Municipality Elite Sports Scholarship, and in 2022, she won the Eva Hedberg scholarship of SEK 10,400 for artistic sports, named for the first Swedish rhythmic gymnastics champion. She began artistic gymnastics at five years old and switched to rhythmic at age 10 as she liked that it allowed her more room to express herself.

== Career ==
Svennbeck was known for her artistry as a gymnast. She was featured as an example in International Gymnastics Federation judge training.

In 2017, she won bronze at the senior Swedish championships. The next year, she won silver in the all-around at the Swedish championships and won three of the four medal in the apparatus finals.

She debuted internationally at the 2019 World Cup in Sofia, where she was 66th in the all-around. She won her first Swedish title. Svennbeck was later selected for the World Championships in Baku along with teammates Cassandra Pettersson and Meja Engdahl. Together, they ranked 39th in the team competition. Svennbeck took the 104th place in the all-around, with her best result being 85th with ball.

The next year, Svennbeck earned a bronze in the team competition at the 2020 Nordic Rhythmic Gymnastics Championships in Kristianstad in March. During the COVID-19 pandemic, she began working at a preschool but found it difficult to balance the work with her training. She spoke with a sports psychologist and lowered the number of hours she worked. Svennbeck also noted that when competitions began again, she was not mentally prepared to compete, in part because she had improved during the break in competitions and was more eager to perform. She also spoke about this with a sports psychologist.

She defended her Swedish title in 2021 and won all the apparatus finals except clubs.

In 2022, she won all the gold medals at the Swedish championships in May. Later that month, she competed at the World Cup in Pamplona, ending ranked 29th in the all-around. A month later, she represented Sweden with her teammates Emma Goeransson and Elina Sheremey at the European Championships in Tel Aviv. She was 56th in the all-around. In September, she participated in the World Championships in Sofia, where she was 62nd in the all-around.

In 2023, she won her fourth consecutive all-around title at the Swedish championships. She competed at the World Cup in Portimão, where she placed 40th. At the European Championships, she placed 61st. At the World Championships, she was the only competitor from Sweden. She placed 69th in the qualifying round.

Svennbeck retired afterward because she found it difficult to both work to support herself and train. She did not have enough time to train to be at the level she wanted, which demotivated her. Svennbeck did not receive any significant sponsorships or financial support from the Swedish Olympic Committee. She said that she hoped that the sport would grow in the future and provide gymnasts with more opportunities for financial support.

== Post-gymnastics career ==
Svennbeck had wanted to become a coach years before her retirement. After completing her competitive career, she began training children. She has also worked as an engineer.

== Routine music information ==
Year	Apparatus	Music Title
2022	Hoop	Giratina by Dimatik, Monik & Carroch
2022	Ball	Mhm Mhm by Manuel Riva & Eneli
2022	Clubs	Awoo by Sofi Tukker
2022	Ribbon	Dance For Me Wallis by Abel Korzeniowski
2019	Hoop	Elastics Hearts by Sia
2019	Ball	Private Investigations by Dire Straits
2019	Clubs	River by Bishop Briggs
2019	Ribbon	Bloodstream by Tokio Myers
