= University of Tampere =

Former university in Tampere, Finland

Coordinates: 61°29′39″N 23°46′41″E

- Tampereen yliopisto
- Latin: Universitas Tamperensis
- Former names: Civic College (1925–1930), School of Social Sciences (1930–1966)
- Type: Public
- Active: 1925–2018
- Affiliations: UGC, IU
- Endowment: €184.6 million (2016)
- Rector: Liisa Laakso
- Academic staff: 1,190 (2016)
- Students: 20,178 (2016)
- Doctoral students: 1,646 (2016)
- Location: Tampere, Finland
- Campus: Urban 130,134 m2 floor area

The University of Tampere (UTA) (Finnish: Tampereen yliopisto (Tay), Latin: Universitas Tamperensis) was a public university in Tampere, Finland that was merged with Tampere University of Technology to create the new Tampere University on 1 January 2019.

The university offered undergraduate, postgraduate and doctoral programmes with 20,178 degree students and 1,981 employees as of 2016. Founded in 1925 in Helsinki as the Civic College (Finnish: Kansalaiskorkeakoulu) and from 1930 onwards known as the School of Social Sciences (Finnish: Yhteiskunnallinen korkeakoulu), the institution relocated to Tampere in 1960 and was renamed as the University of Tampere in 1966. In 2016, its budget was €184.6 million of which 59% was government funding.

== History ==
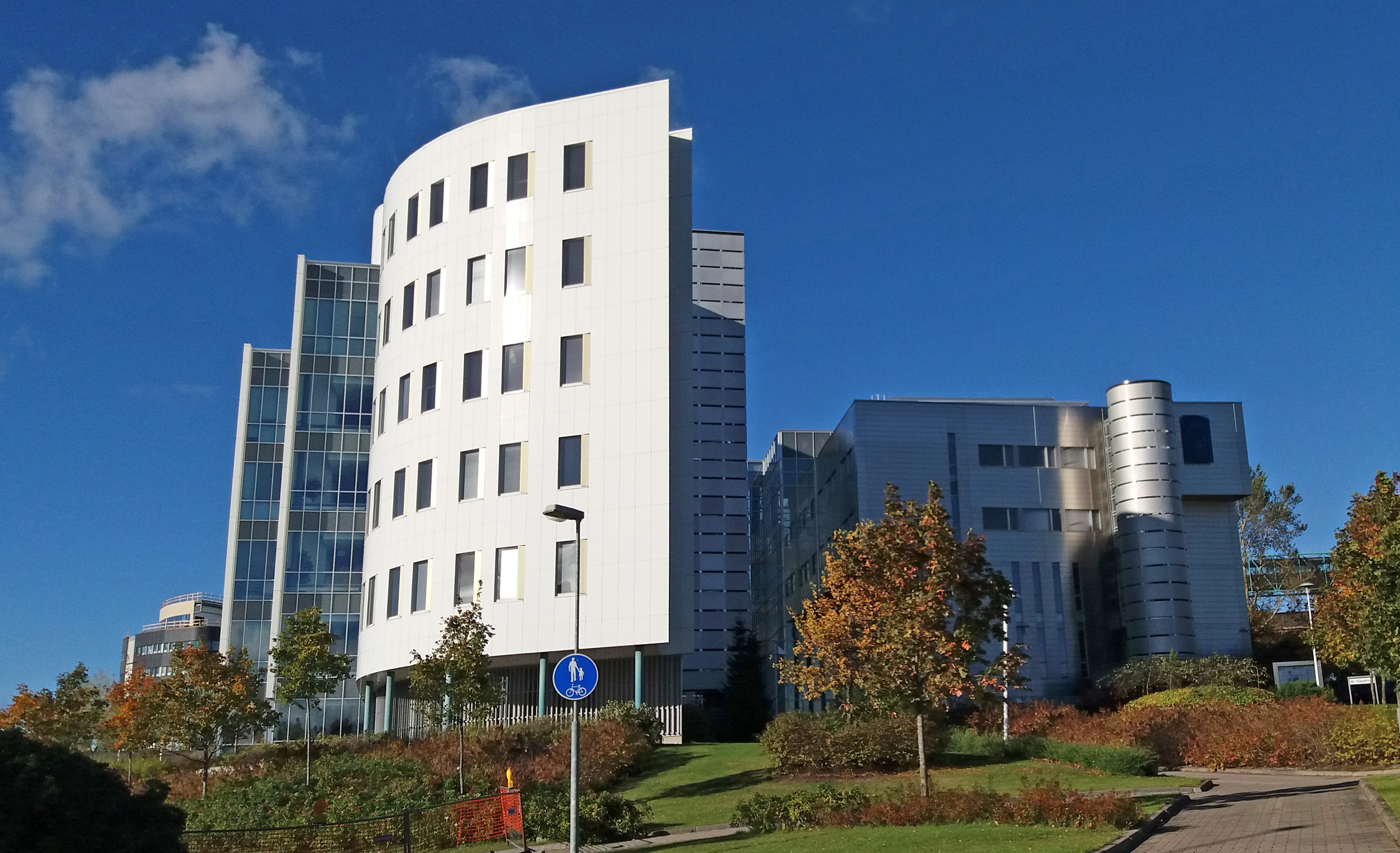
Pinni building of the main campus in Kalevanharju, Tampere pictured in 2015

The institution was established in 1925 as the Civic College in Helsinki teaching public administration, organisation management and journalism with an inaugural intake of 72 students. In 1930, a total of 195 students were enrolled at the college and its name was amended to the School of Social Sciences. Similarly, the institution's vocationally oriented bachelor's degrees were expanded into municipal administration, public law, child protection, and civic education as well as a master's degree in social sciences.

The first faculty, the Faculty of Social Sciences, was established in 1949 and the number of students steadily increased from 227 in 1940 to 661 in 1950. The programmes offered by the school grew, such as degrees in social and youth work, librarianship and economics as well as a prison officer's diploma. The first doctoral degree was completed in 1955 and in 1956, the City of Tampere and the School of Social Sciences agreed on relocating the school to Tampere. By 1960, the number of students had increased to 933 and the School of Social Sciences moved to its new Päätalo main building, designed by Toivo Korhonen, at Kalevantie 4, Tampere. After the Faculty of Humanities and the Faculty of Economics and Business Administration were established in 1964 and 1965, respectively, the School of Social Sciences was renamed as the University of Tampere in 1966.

A programme, called Tampere3, to merge the university with Tampere University of Technology and Tampere University of Applied Sciences was started in the spring of 2014. The merger was approved by Parliament in December 2017 and came into effect on 1 January 2019. The new foundation-based interdisciplinary higher education institution was named Tampere University after the proposed name of Tampere New University faced criticism.

== Academics ==
University rankings

Global – Overall
- ARWU World: 501-600 (2019)
- CWTS World: 708 (2019)
- QS World: 395 (2020)
- THE World: 251-300 (2020)
- USNWR Global: 398 (2020)

A total of 14,712 degree students studied at the University of Tampere in 2016, including 11,810 students in bachelor's and master's degree programmes and 1,646 doctoral students. Likewise in 2016, the university received 17,482 applications of whom 1,418 were enrolled for an admission rate of 8.1%. It hosted four centres of excellence in research, such as on mitochondrial disease and in Russian studies, as of 2016. As of 2017, a tuition fee of approximately 10,000 euros was charged in general from non-European Union/European Economic Area citizens studying in the English-taught master's degree programmes with 50% or 100% cover scholarships available. Other students, such as exchange or doctoral students, were exempt from fees. The university was ranked 201–250 on the Times Higher Education World University Rankings 2018. Likewise, it ranked 551–600 on the QS World University Rankings 2018 and 101–150 on its Communication and Media Studies category.

== Organisation ==
In 2016, the total budget of the university was 184.6 million euros, of which 108.8 million was core funding by the Government of Finland and 67.49 million was external endowments. In addition to its independent units, Finnish Social Science Data Archive (FSD), Laboratory Services, Language Centre and Library, the university was organized into six faculties as of a 1 January 2017 reorganization:

- Faculty of Communication Sciences (COMS)
- Faculty of Education (EDU)
- Faculty of Management (JKK)
- Faculty of Medicine and Life Sciences (MED)
- Faculty of Natural Sciences (LUO)
- Faculty of Social Sciences (SOC)

== Rectors ==
The following people served as rectors of the University of Tampere:

- 1925–1932 Yrjö Ruutu
- 1932–1935 Eino Kuusi
- 1935–1945 Yrjö Ruutu
- 1945–1948 Urpo Harva
- 1948–1949 Antero Rinne
- 1949–1953 Yrjö Ruutu
- 1953–1954 V.J. Sukselainen
- 1954–1956 Tuttu Tarkiainen
- 1957–1962 Armas Nieminen
- 1962–1968 Paavo Koli
- 1969–1974 Jaakko Uotila
- 1975–1976 Erkki Pystynen
- 1976–1981 Reino Erma
- 1981–1987 Jarmo Visakorpi
- 1987–1993 Tarmo Pukkila
- 1993–1996 Jarmo Visakorpi
- 1996–1997 Uolevi Lehtinen
- 1998–2004 Jorma Sipilä
- 2004–2009 Krista Varantola
- 2009–2015 Kaija Holli
- 2016–2018 Liisa Laakso

== Campus ==
The University of Tampere had two campuses in Tampere: the main campus in the centre, near the Tampere railway station, and the Kauppi campus next to the Tampere University Hospital. The main campus hosted most of the faculties and comprised the Päätalo, Pinni, Linna and Virta buildings while the Faculty of Medicine and Life Sciences and Laboratory Services are located at the Arvo building in the Kauppi campus. The Päätalo building was completed in 1960 and served as the university's first premises at Tampere. The Pinni complex was completed gradually during the 1990s and 2000s and the Linna and Virta buildings were ready for use in 2006 and 2009, respectively. The medicine-focused Arvo building was built in two separate phases reached in 2009 and 2016. The floor area of the university's facilities totaled 130,134 m^{2} as of 2016. Instead of dormitories at the campuses, the Tampere Student Housing Foundation rented apartments to students around Tampere.

== Notable people ==
- Vincent Ialenti
- Jyrki Katainen
- Aki Kaurismäki
- Elina Hemminki
- Sanna Marin
- Oiva Paloheimo
- Erkki Pystynen
- Liisa Rantalaiho
- Pekka Sillanaukee
- V. J. Sukselainen
- Ulla Vuorela
- Raili Kauppi

== See also ==
- Education in Finland
- Police University College
- Student unionism in Finland
