= Ulla Vuorela =

Finnish professor of social anthropology (1945–2011)

Ulla Vuorela (30 August 1945 – 17 December 2011) was a Finnish professor of social anthropology.

== Early years and education ==
Ulla Vuorela was born on 30 August 1945 in Helsinki. She graduated from the University of Helsinki with a major in Finno-Ugric ethnology. At the same time as studying folklore, Vuorela studied at the Sibelius Academy to become a teacher. During her studies, she taught piano at the Helsinki Conservatory between 1973 and 1976.

== Research and career ==
Vuorela started her research career as a research assistant at the Department of Ethnology at the University of Helsinki and worked as a research assistant at the Academy of Finland. In 1989, she was appointed Assistant Professor of Social Anthropology at the University of Tampere. In her teaching and research work, she combined themes, theories and research methods in Development Studies, Women's Studies (Gender Studies) and Cultural Studies. Vuorela worked extensively with Tanzanian partners in particular. In 1999, Vuorela was appointed as the first Academy Professor at the Academy of Finland. The professorship has been devoted specifically to gender research, which was called the Women's Research in 1999.

She died on 17 December 2011 in Helsinki.
