= Pekka Sillanaukee =

Finnish health technology entrepreneur (born 1964)

Pekka Sillanaukee (born 1964, Tampere Finland) is a Finnish health technology entrepreneur. Pekka graduated as an organic chemist in 1989, he became a Ph.D. in 1992 and was appointed Docent of Medical Biochemistry at the Faculty of Medicine of the University of Tampere in 1993. Pekka has been a co-author of approximately 120 scientific original articles, reviews or summaries. His scientific work has focused on clinical and medical biochemistry, alcohol, brain and cardiovascular related diseases, and development of laboratory-diagnostic tests and processes. He also has four international patents.

Pekka has worked as a researcher at the Medical School of the University of Tampere and at Tampere University Hospital, as a responsible clinical researcher at Alko's research laboratories from 1987 to 1993, then as a director and business unit member at Pharmacia & Upjohn Inc. (Pfizer) 1994–1999, CEO at FIT Biotech Plc 1999–2004, and thereafter as an entrepreneur, co-founder or co-owner of different Finnish, Swedish and Estonian health technology and service companies including Bioretec Ltd, ESO International Ltd, Innokas Medical Ltd, Nordic Senior Services Ltd, Nova Vita Ltd, OS-Service, Ovumia Ltd, Palvelutähti Ltd, Paavolankoti Ltd, and Quattromed Ltd.

Since 2014 Sillanaukee has focused on the development of fertility treatment technologies and practices in Ovumia Fertility Clinic.

== Education ==
M.Sc., University of Jyväskylä, Natural Science Faculty, Dep. of Chemistry and Dep. of Cell Biology, 1989.

Ph.D., University of Tampere, Medical Faculty, Dep. of Biomedical Science, 1992.

Assistant Professorship (docent) of Medical Biochemistry, Medical Faculty, University of Tampere, Tampere, 1993. Qualification for Assistant Professorship (docent) in Karolinska Institute, Stockholm, Sweden, 1998.

Business & Executive management studies in Helsinki School of Economics and Business Administration 1993–1994, Stockholm School of Economics and Business Administration 1995–1998, London Business School 1998–1999, Aalto University 2011.

== Patents ==
1) Use of sialic acid determination for determining alcohol consumption

2) An improved method for diagnosing alcohol abuse

3) Immunoassay and Kit for IgA Antibodies Specific for Acetaldehyde Adducts

4) Immunochemical methods
