= Elina Gismeeva =

Russian kickboxer (1992–2019)

Elina Almazovna Gismeeva
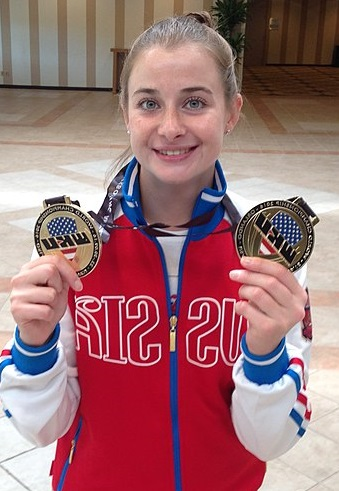
- Born: 6 May 1992; Murmansk, Russia
- Died: 4 August 2019 (aged 27); Sevastopol, Russia
- Occupation: professional kickboxer
- Known for: World kickboxing champion

Elina Almazovna Gismeeva (6 May 1992 – 4 August 2019) was a Russian kick boxer who was highly ranked coming second in the world in 2017. She and fellow kickboxing champion Fatima Zhagupova were drowned in an accident in Sevastopol. She has won the silver medal at the W.A.K.O. World Amateur Championships and a silver medal at the W.A.K.O. European Amateur Championships.

== Life ==
Gismeeva was born in Murmansk in 1992. Her father Almaz Gismeev had been world kickboxing champion nine times and was a deputy on the Murmansk city council.

She was runner up in the European championship in 2016 and was runner up in 2017 in the world championship.

When she became the runner up at the World Association of Kickboxing Organisations world championship, Fatima Zhagupova was the overall winner.

Gismeeva drowned in Sevastopol in 2019 after jumping from a pier to have one last swim before returning home. Her fellow kickboxer Fatima Zhagupova dived in to save her, despite not being a strong swimmer, and they both drowned. They were both attending a training camp in Crimea.
