= Elina Schumacher =

German politician (born 1999)

Member of the Berlin House of Representatives
- Incumbent
- Assumed office 29 October 2026

Personal details
- Born: 1999 (age 26–27)
- Party: Alliance 90/The Greens (since 2019)

Elina Schumacher (born 1999) is a German politician who was elected member of the Berlin House of Representatives in 2026. She has worked for Lena Gumnior since 2025. From 2021 to 2025, she worked for Julian Pahlke.
