= Elina Shirazi =

American journalist

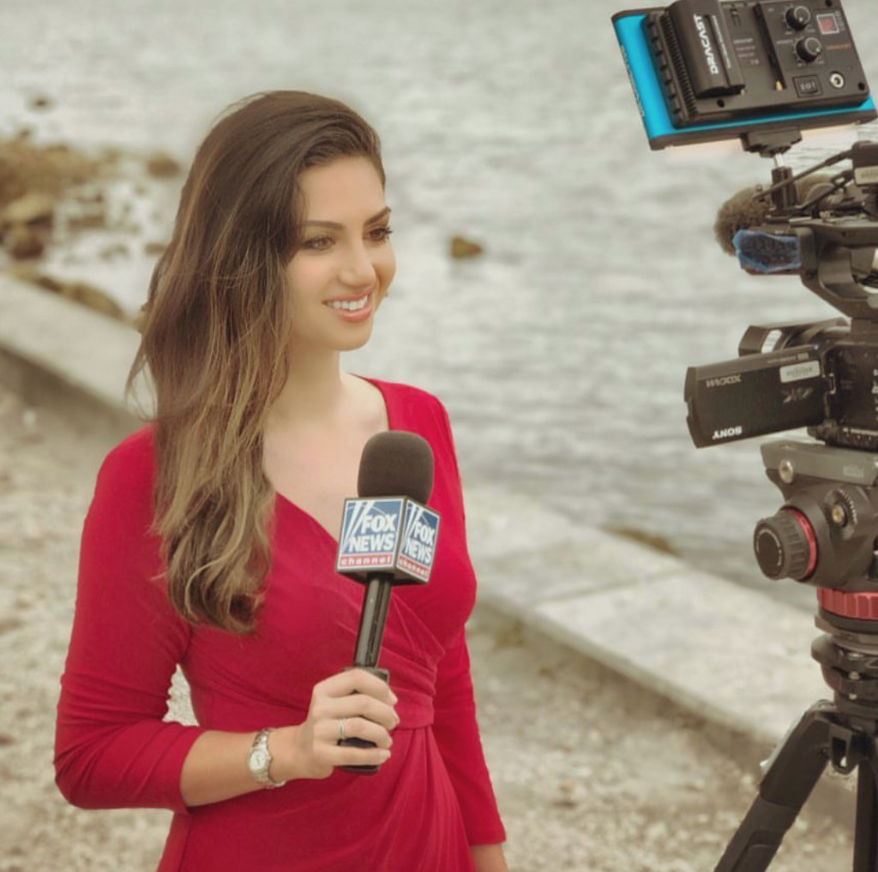
- Education: American University
- Occupation: Reporter

Elina Shirazi (Persian: الینا شیرازی) is a multi-lingual Iranian-American journalist and Washington, DC based correspondent for NewsNation. Her previous experience included working for Fox News Channel.

== Career ==
Shirazi began her career as a producer for Fox News and later worked as a reporter and anchor for WDVM-TV, a station covering Virginia, Maryland and the District of Columbia. She became one of the first Iranian-Americans to work for Fox News on-air when she was hired by the network in 2018 as a multimedia reporter based in Miami, where she covered the 2020 United States presidential election and Florida news, including the state's recovery from Hurricane Michael.

She transitioned to NewsNation as a Washington, DC, based correspondent in 2023.
