= Elina Syrjälä =

Finnish footballer (born 1982)

Personal information
- Full name: Elina Hannele Syrjälä
- Date of birth: 1 March 1982 (age 44)
- Place of birth: Helsinki, Finland
- Position: Defender

Senior career*
Years	Team	Apps	(Gls)
2002–2009	Honka		
2008	→ Asker (loan)	13	(1)
2010–2011	HJK	42	(13)

International career
2010–2011	Finland	13	(0)
- * Club domestic league appearances and goals

Elina Hannele Syrjälä (born 1 March 1982) is a Finnish former football defender who finished her playing career at HJK Helsinki of the Naisten Liiga. She previously played for FC Honka, with whom she also played in the European Cup, and Asker Fotball in Norway's Toppserien. She was also a member of the Finnish national team, appearing in the 2011 World Cup qualifying and the 2011 Algarve Cup. She announced her retirement from football in April 2012.
