= Elina Zúñiga =

Argentinian immunologist

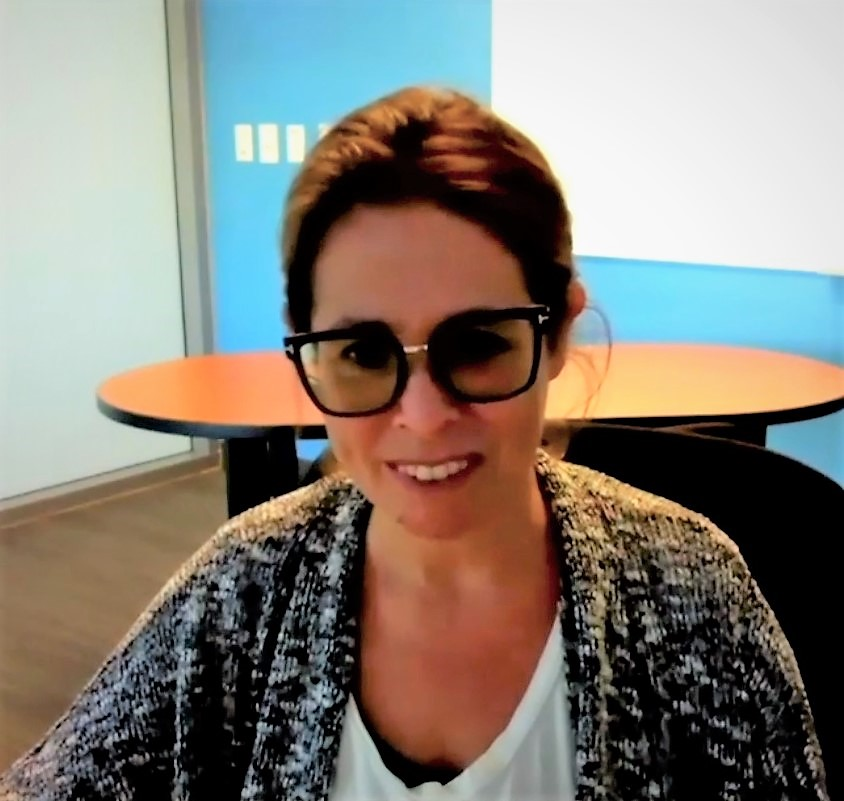
- Zúñiga lectures to the National Institutes of Health in 2020
- Born: Argentina
- Education: National University of Cordoba; Salk Institute for Biological Studies
- Known for: Changes to innate and adaptive immunity in acute and chronic viral infection
- Awards: American Association of Immunology Vanguard Lecture, The Vilcek Finalist Prize for Creative Promise, Hellman Foundation Scholar Award, Pew Charitable Trust Postdoctoral Research Fellowship
- Scientific career
- Fields: Immunology, host-virus interactions
- Workplaces: University of California, San Diego

Elina Zúñiga is an Argentinian Immunologist and Professor of Molecular Biology in the Division of Biological Sciences at the University of California, San Diego. Zúñiga has made critical discoveries regarding host-virus interactions in both acute and chronic infections. Using lymphocytic choriomeningitis models (LCMV) and murine cytomegalovirus models, her laboratory at UCSD studies host immune adaptations in chronic viral disease and methods of viral suppression of the immune system in order to develop novel methods and identify novel targets of anti-viral defence.

In 2018, Zúñiga was chosen by the American Association of Immunologists to give the international Vanguard Lecture. Zúñiga is also co-founder of the Global Immunotalks series which she and Carla Rothlin started in 2020 as a means to make cutting-edge immunology research freely available and easily accessible to a global audience.

== Early life and education ==
Zúñiga was born in Argentina. She pursued her Bachelors of Science and her Masters of Science in biochemistry from the National University of Cordoba in Argentina. Zúñiga stayed at the National University of Cordoba to pursue a Ph.D. in biochemistry. She was mentored by Adriana Gruppi, and focused her work on the B cell response to the parasite, Trypanosoma cruzi, the cause of chronic Chagas disease. She discovered that the parasites provide signals to the immune system that prompt early and aberrant apoptosis of B cells to weaken the immune response. A critical finding was that after infection by the parasite, B cells begin to express both Fas and FasL which allows for B cell-B cell killing. Not only did her work show the preferential killing of IgG+ B cells, but IgG+ B cells that are specific for Trypanosoma antigen and not self antigens. Her work was awarded the Prize from the Belgian Development Cooperation for its contributions to our understanding of the pathogenesis of Trypanosoma cruzi infection and her work suggested a possible therapeutic target, namely by blocking Fas/FasL protein interactions.

After completing her Ph.D., Zúñiga moved to the United States to pursue her postdoctoral studies at The Scripps Research Institute in La Jolla, California funded by two postdoctoral scholarships. She worked under the mentorship of Michael Oldstone studying virus-immune system interactions. She focused her work on plasmacytoid dendritic cells (pDCs) which are a unique innate immune cell that produces large quantities of type I interferons. She found that viral infection induces bone marrow pDCs to differentiate into myeloid dendritic cells (mDCs). This change in phenotype and function enables the innate immune system with the enhanced ability to process and present antigens and recognize microbial antigens through Toll-like receptors.

During her postdoctoral years, Zúñiga became close friends with her colleague and Global Immunotalks co-founder, Carla Rothlin. While they were both completing postdocs in La Jolla, Zúñiga taught Rothlin how to grow dendritic cells in culture to help her with her own postdoctoral work.

== Career and research ==
In 2007, Zúñiga was recruited to the University of California, San Diego where became an assistant professor in the Division of Biological Sciences. She was later promoted to Full Professor of Molecular Biology in the Division of Biological Sciences. Zúñiga's lab studies the strategies used by viruses to persist inside the host and mediate chronic infection, with a focus on T cells and dendritic cells. The work of her lab is aimed at discovering novel methods to target the immune system or the viral pathogen to prevent pathogenesis and ameliorate viral disease burden.

=== T cells in viral infection ===
In 2016, Zúñiga's lab explored the unknown mechanisms by which CD4 T cell activity is suppressed in chronic viral infections. They found that TGF-β signaling was specifically restricting the activity and differentiation of anti-viral CD4 T cells.[10] TGF-β was found to suppress granzyme and perforin expression as well as the transcription factor eomesodermin, which limits anti-viral immune defences in chronic infection.[10]

Zúñiga's team also found that IL-6R signalling in T follicular helper cells (Tfh) is critical to the generation of a robust antibody mediated immune response in chronic viral infection with LCMV clone 13. They found that in T cells specific IL-6R deficient mice, ICOS expression was reduced, the presence of germinal centers was reduced, class switching was impaired, and antibodies against LCMV had overall lower avidity. This IL-6R mediated Tfh accumulation and support for antibody generation enables viral control in chronic infections.

In 2020, Zúñiga and her team found a novel connection between CD8 T cell activity, anorexia, and microbiome changes in chronic infection. They found that CD8 T cell responses in viral infection led to anorexia which caused a change in microbiome composition. This change skewed microbiomes towards having more Akkermansia muciniphila, and this skew in turn suppressed effector functions of CD8 T cells. Her work highlighted the global connections between infection, immune status, behavior, and microbiome in the context of chronic viral infection.

=== Innate changes in viral infection ===
Inspired by Zúñiga's postdoctoral work, her lab also focuses on adaptations to the innate immune system, specifically dendritic cells, in chronic viral infection. Since plasmacytoid dendritic cells (pDC) are one of the most powerful producers of the type I interferons (IFN-I), they are critical to study in the context of infection, cancer, and autoimmunity. In 2016, Zúñiga and her team found a novel mechanism by which pDC IFN-I production is down regulated through CD28. They found that CD28 is highly expressed on pDCs, and upon TLR stimulation, it causes down-regulation of IFN-I limiting anti-viral responses. Later on, Zúñiga's team further elucidated mechanisms by which pDCs are regulated. They found that Src family kinases (SFK), Fyn and Lyn, are critical to pDC responses in vitro and in vivo, and that SFK inhibitors could be useful in modulating pDC responses in human disease.

In 2018, Zúñiga's lab discovered novel mechanisms of innate immune exhaustion in pDCs. They found that sustained IFN-I and toll-like receptor 7 signaling maintained an exhausted pool of pDCs in the bone marrow and spleen. In the periphery, exhausted pDCs self-renewed, sustaining a pool of pDCs with compromised IFN-I production and rendering the host with weaker resistance to secondary infection.

== Advocacy and outreach ==
Zúñiga is a prominent advocate for diversity, inclusion, and equity in academia. She voiced her commitment to diversity, inclusion, and creating equal and equitable opportunities to learn and engage with science on behalf of her lab and she recently created the Global Immunotalks lecture series, in collaboration with Carla Rothlin, as a means to provide free and equitable access to cutting-edge immunology research without the need for travel. These talks were inspired by Zúñiga's awareness of the inequities that exist in terms of access to cutting-edge research, and that opportunities to attend seminars and hear cutting-edge research are very limited for a large number of people in the academic community. The Global Immunotalks series will be continuing in 2021, with Zoom lectures hosted every Wednesday, featuring the top immunologists from around the world. In order to make the talks available longitudinally, the recorded talks are posted on YouTube.

== Awards and honors ==
- 2018 American Association of Immunology Vanguard Lecture
- 2015 American Cancer Society Scholar Award
- 2012 Leukemia and Lymphoma Society Scholar Award
- 2011 The Vilcek Finalist Prize for Creative Promise
- 2008 Hellman Foundation Scholar Award
- 2002 Antorchas Foundation Postdoctoral Research Fellowship
- 2002 Pew Charitable Trust Postdoctoral Research Fellowship
- 1995 Prize of the Belgian Development Cooperation

== Select publications ==
- Loureiro, ME; Zorzetto-Fernandes, AL; Radoshitzky, S; Chi, X; Dallari, S; Marooki, N; Lèger, P; Foscaldi, S; Harjono, V; Sharma, S; Zid, BM; López, N; de la Torre, JC; Bavari, S; Zúñiga, E (2018). "DDX3 suppresses type I interferons and favors viral replication during Arenavirus infection". PLOS Pathog. 14 (7) e1007125. doi:10.1371/journal.ppat.1007125. PMC 6042795. PMID 30001425.
- Macal, M; Jo, Y; Dallari, S; Chang, AY; Dai, J; Swaminathan, S; Wehrens, EJ; Fitzgerald-Bocarsly, P; Zúñiga, EI (2018). "Self-Renewal and Toll-like Receptor Signaling Sustain Exhausted Plasmacytoid Dendritic Cells during Chronic Viral Infection". Immunity. 48 (4): 730–744.e5. doi:10.1016/j.immuni.2018.03.020. PMC 5937984. PMID 29669251.
- Dallari, S; Macal, M; Loureiro, ME; Jo, Y; Swanson, L; Hesser, C; Ghosh, P; Zuniga, EI (2017). "Src family kinases Fyn and Lyn are constitutively activated and mediate plasmacytoid dendritic cell responses". Nat Commun. 8 14830. Bibcode:2017NatCo...814830D. doi:10.1038/ncomms14830. PMC 5382270. PMID 28368000.
- Lewis, GM; Wehrens, EJ; Labarta-Bajo, L; Streeck, H; Zuniga, EI (2016). "TGF-β receptor maintains CD4 T helper cell identity during chronic viral infections". J Clin Invest. 126 (10): 3799–3813. doi:10.1172/JCI87041. PMC 5096797. PMID 27599295.
- Macal, M; Tam, MA; Hesser, C; Di Domizio, J; Leger, P; Gilliet, M; Zuniga, EI (2016). "CD28 Deficiency Enhances Type I IFN Production by Murine Plasmacytoid Dendritic Cells". J Immunol. 196 (4): 1900–9. doi:10.4049/jimmunol.1501658. PMC 4744517. PMID 26773151.
- Harker, JA; Dolgoter, A; Zuniga, EI (2013). "Cell-intrinsic IL-27 and gp130 cytokine receptor signaling regulates virus-specific CD4⁺ T cell responses and viral control during chronic infection". Immunity. 39 (3): 548–59. doi:10.1016/j.immuni.2013.08.010. PMC 4701058. PMID 23993651.
- Macal, M; Lewis, GM; Kunz, S; Flavell, R; Harker, JA; Zúñiga, EI (2012). "Plasmacytoid dendritic cells are productively infected and activated through TLR-7 early after arenavirus infection". Cell Host Microbe. 11 (6): 617–30. doi:10.1016/j.chom.2012.04.017. PMC 3377983. PMID 22704622.
- Harker, JA; Lewis, GM; Mack, L; Zuniga, EI (2011). "Late interleukin-6 escalates T follicular helper cell responses and controls a chronic viral infection". Science. 334 (6057): 825–9. Bibcode:2011Sci...334..825H. doi:10.1126/science.1208421. PMC 3388900. PMID 21960530.
- Zuniga, EI; McGavern, DB; Pruneda-Paz, JL; Teng, C; Oldstone, MB (2004). "Bone marrow plasmacytoid dendritic cells can differentiate into myeloid dendritic cells upon virus infection". Nat Immunol. 5 (12): 1227–34. doi:10.1038/ni1136. PMC 5340300. PMID 15531885.
