= Elina Hemminki =

Finnish academic

- Born: 22 August 1948 (age 78); Hausjärvi, Finland
- Occupations: Researcher, professor
- Known for: Critical innovative research

Academic background
- Education: University of Helsinki (MD); University of Tampere (DrPH)

Kirsti Elina Hemminki (born 22 August 1948) is a Finnish academic who was trained in medicine and public health. She has wide research experience in health services and epidemiological research. Her research interests include use, determinants and consequences of medical technology, particularly in the field of preventive services. Many of her examples come from women's and children's health and drugs (medicines). Her interests include health services trials, and how ethical and governance rules apply to them. Her other research interests have included research policy and research regulation.

== Education ==
Hemminki graduated from a high school in Hyvinkää, Finland in 1967. She received her medical degree from the University of Helsinki (Licentiate of Medicine, MD) in 1973, and her DrPH, from the University of Tampere. She was a postdoctoral fellow in the Department of Health Services Administration, School of Public Health, the Johns Hopkins University, from 1976 to 1978.

== Career ==
Hemminki started her research work while still a medical student. Her plans to combine research and clinical practice were ruined after realizing that combining these two with raising children was too much. Thus, since her graduation she has worked as a researcher and teacher in universities and research institutes, mainly in Finland. Her latest positions are a research professor in THL National Institute of Health and Welfare, and an adjunct professor in public health at the University of Helsinki and Tampere University.

Hemminki's first research interests were physicians’ prescribing practices and medicine control, using psychotropic drugs as an example. Already in this early work she had particular interest in outside, particularly commercial forces, influencing physicians and the overutilization of medicines. The themes of physicians’ behaviour and commercial forces have been a thread of her research throughout her career.

Her plans to continue research on physicians’ drug prescribing changed in her postdoctoral studies in the US in 1977. For family reasons she was tied to Baltimore, and she started a new field, technology and reproductive health, which was more suitable to her study with Barbara Starfield in Johns Hopkins University. Working with Starfield, Hemminki did reviews on iron-prophylaxis and drugs against premature labor, using approaches which today would be called systematic reviews or meta-analyses. The reviews were made before electronic data searches of medical literature or the current methodology were available. The good local library was invaluable.

In 1979 Hemminki visited Oxford Perinatal Epidemiology Unit, then headed by Iain Chalmers, at the time when the idea of evidence-based medicine and systematic reviews was developed. Even though she did not become an active member of Cochrane Collaboration, later rising from the ideas in Oxford, the critical thinking and ways of approaching the value of individual health technologies were important for her later work. She was active in various international networks, including ISTAHC (International society of technology assessment in health care), later transformed into Health Technology Assessment International (HTAi).

Besides systematic reviews, Hemminki's other tools to critically examine the use of health technology were area variation as well as comparing the scientific evidence with the actual practice. She has also had a great interest to adapt the methods of randomized trials to evaluate health services (health services trials). Other methodological interests Elina Hemminki has had include use of administrative health registers in research.

Many of Hemminki's research focused on reproduction, first pregnancy and birth, and later more broadly, menopause. The interest in menopause started in a research visit to John and Sonja McKinley's research unit in Boston in 1987, later known as the New England Research Institutes, which at the time had interest in menopause. That was the time of a hot debate of the benefits of hormone replacement therapy (HRT), mainly based on non-experimental data. The subsequent study in Finland on the menopause as a health service question, widened into involvement into study and debate on health effects of HRT. That interest produced a number of important publications, including the selection bias to HRT and the use of non-public documents of drug control authorities to study adverse effects of drugs. The interest led also to a small trial in Estonia, originally planned to be part of a large WISDOM study.

The work with HRT health effects concretely showed what it was like to have a varying view with local establishment, as well as the needs and working habits of media. This experience activated Hemminki's old interest in commercial factors influencing physicians and conflict of interests (COI). In her 1977 paper in Social Science & Medicine, Hemminki had empirically showed that many Finnish key-physicians had associations with drug industry. The potential consequences of such close collaboration include merging of the interest of commercial actors, particularly drug industry, and medical establishment, and confusing the voice of the scientific world. This is likely to have adverse effects on medical practice and health policy.

The large role of the commercial actors in funding health research, hinders on evidence-based medicine, as well as the dominance of drug research and its paradigms in regulation of medical research contributed to Hemminki's interest to study medical research and its regulation. This work has shown that the current regulation prevents health services trials and other “non-traditional” designs, and is a hinder to evidence based health care. Her research has also contributed to illustrate an important element in the distortion of knowledge: publication bias and secrecy around commercial studies.

Most of Hemminki's scientific production is in English, and available through scientific literature databases, such as PubMed. Policy-oriented papers meant for domestic professionals and lay-people are mainly in Finnish. Her empirical research work has mainly data from developed countries. But her work in China and Mozambique showed that many of the questions of health technology and health services are the same in poorer countries, and often clearer to observe.

== Personal ==
Elina has three adult children and six grandchildren.

Hemminki has supervised and mentored a number of younger researchers, who later have had successful careers either in research or in health administrative positions. Elina Hemminki has had various positions of trust in scientific and administrative bodies, including expert positions in the Academy of Finland. She has been active in many professional and other NGOs, including Health Action International (HAI) and Finnish NGO Physicians for Social Responsibility.
