= Greg Lemke =

American neuroscientist, immunologist, and author

Greg Erwin Lemke
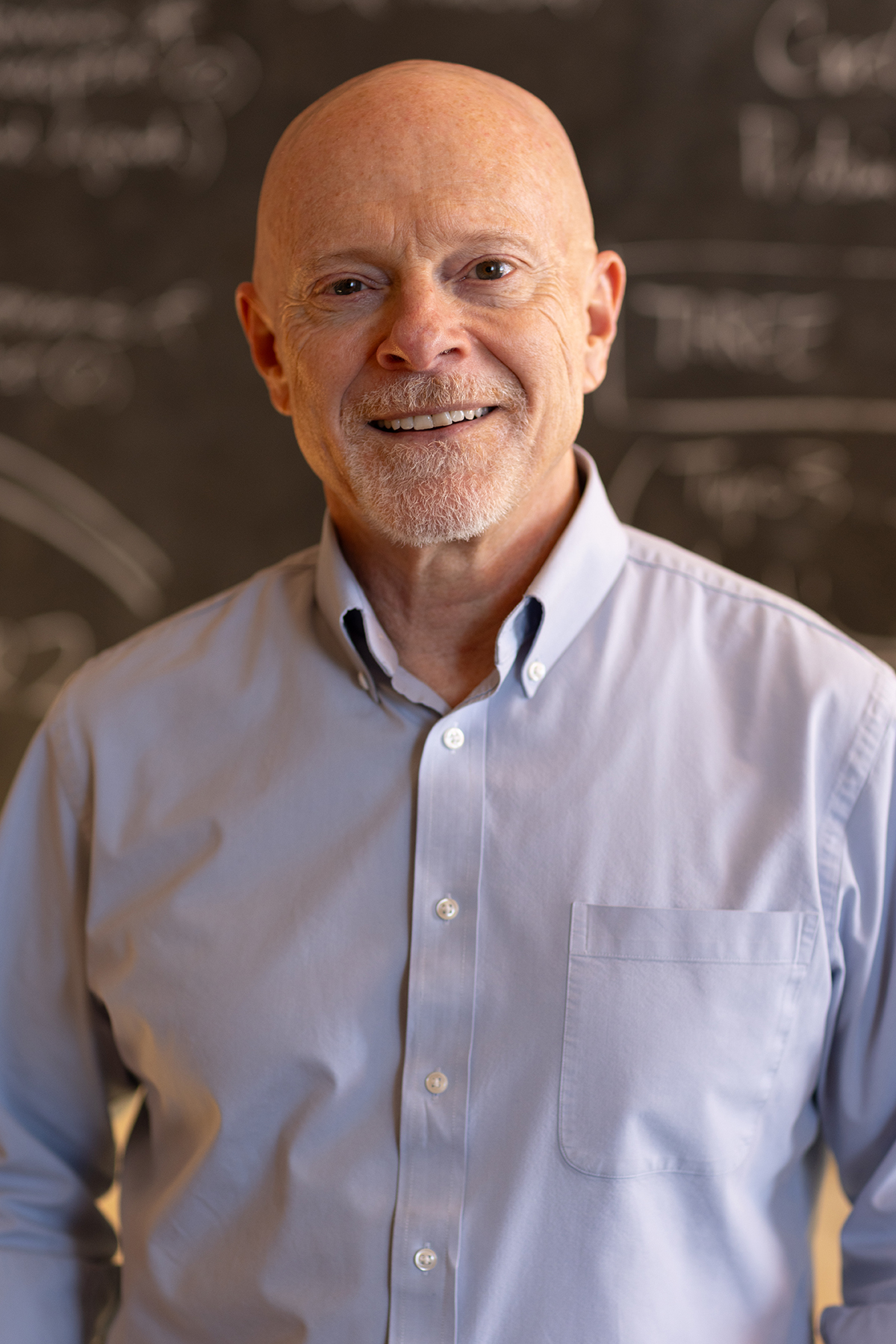
- Occupations: Neuroscientist, immunologist, academic, and public figure

Academic background
- Education: S.B., Life Sciences; Ph.D., Biology; Postdoctoral study., Molecular Biology
- Alma mater: Massachusetts Institute of Technology; California Institute of Technology; Columbia University

Academic work
- Institutions: University of California; Salk Institute for Biological Studies
- Notable works: Genetic analyses of receptor signaling

Greg Erwin Lemke is an American neuroscientist, immunologist, and author. He is Professor Emeritus at the Salk Institute for Biological Studies, where he previously held the Françoise Gilot-Salk chair. He was also an Adjunct Professor at the University of California San Diego.

Lemke has used molecular genetics to investigate the signaling networks that regulate immune system function and the development of the nervous system. His authored works have been published in academic journals, including Nature, Science, and Cell. He is the recipient of several awards, and was elected as a Fellow of the American Association for the Advancement of Science in 2007 and the National Academy of Science in 2025.

== Education ==
Lemke was born into a working-class family in Delphos, a small town in northwest Ohio. His father was a railroad lineman and his mother a hairdresser. Lemke earned his S.B. in Life Sciences from the Massachusetts Institute of Technology, where he was a National Merit Scholar, in 1978. He was later awarded a Ph.D. in Biology from the California Institute of Technology in 1983, for work with Jeremy Brockes. He completed postdoctoral study in molecular biology with Richard Axel (Columbia University) in 1985.

== Career ==
Lemke joined the Salk Institute for Biological Studies in 1985, eventually becoming Full Professor and Director of the Molecular Neurobiology Laboratory in 1995. He was awarded the Françoise Gilot-Salk Professorship in 2012, and was elected to three separate terms as Chair of the Salk Institute Faculty. In 2023, he was named Chief Science Officer of the Institute. He also held teaching appointments in the Department of Neuroscience at the University of California San Diego School of Medicine, beginning in 1988, eventually becoming Adjunct Professor in 1995. He has held advisory roles with academic institutions, including the University of Basel (Switzerland), the Florey Institute (Australia), the Helmholtz Gemeinschaft (Germany), and the Korea Advanced Institute of Science and Technology. He founded Xetrios Therapeutics in 2009, which was later acquired by Kolltan Pharmaceuticals.

== Research ==
Lemke's research spans discoveries in neurobiology and immunology, with a particular focus on receptor tyrosine kinases (RTKs) and their roles in cellular signaling, development, and immune regulation. His Ph.D. work identified glial growth factor (GGF), a protein critical for Schwann cell proliferation, elucidating its biochemical properties and distinguishing it from other growth factors. In his postdoctoral work with Axel, he cloned the Schwann cell gene that encodes myelin protein zero (MPZ), the major protein of the peripheral myelin sheath. He subsequently showed that MPZ is essential to the proper formation and function of this sheath. In his own lab at the Salk, he explored the intricate roles of RTKs in neural development, and in a single paper in 1991 provided the first identification of 11 of the 58 RTKs that are encoded in mammalian genomes. These novel RTKs included new members of the Eph, FGFR, and ErbB families, but also defined two entirely new RTK families.

Much of the subsequent work of the Lemke's lab has involved the genetic dissection, through the generation of mouse mutants, of the function of the novel RTKs identified in the 1991 paper. The most significant of these efforts address the ErbB, Eph, and, most notably, the TAM families. For example, he, along with his colleagues used loss-of-function mutants to show that ErbB4, a receptor for GGF and related ‘neuregulins’, is essential for cardiac muscle differentiation, Schwann cell survival, and neuronal axon guidance. The absence of ErbB4 in mice resulted in lethal cardiac and neural developmental defects, establishing its critical function in these processes. With respect to neural development, his combined gain- and loss-of-function studies of the EphA3, 4, 5, and 6 receptors explored sensory nervous system mapping. These experiments showed that topographic neural connections are guided by relative EphA receptor expression levels in the retina, which dictate neuronal targeting from the eye to the brain.

A significant part of Lemke's studies relate to the 'TAM' receptors – Tyro3, Axl, and Mer. These receptors were initially 'orphans' – in that their activating ligands were unknown. Along with his collaborators, he established that these ligands are Protein S and Gas6, the former known for its role in blood coagulation. These findings revealed a link between protease cascades, cellular signaling, and tissue development, emphasizing their broader physiological relevance. A large body of subsequent work demonstrated that TAM receptors are primarily expressed by phagocytic cells, in macrophages of the immune system and elsewhere, where they play two essential and mechanistically related roles. The first of these is the recognition and clearance of dead (apoptotic) cells, many billions of which are generated each day in the human body. The second is the inhibition of the innate immune response in macrophages and dendritic cells of the immune system, where TAM receptors were shown to mitigate hyperactivation of these antigen-presenting cells, preventing autoimmunity. The receptors function as feedback inhibitors of inflammation, tightly regulating Toll-like receptor and cytokine signaling cascades.

Lemke's research on TAM receptor-ligand activity in the context of phagocytosis and inflammation has contributed to advancements in understanding human health. He delineated the fundamental molecular determinants of TAM receptor-ligand-phospholipid interaction. In later studies, he revealed that Axl and Mer are expressed by microglia, the macrophages of the brain and spinal cord, where they regulate critical microglial activities in both normal tissue homeostasis and disease. He demonstrated that the TAMs and their ligands are central regulators of microglial recognition and engulfment of amyloid beta in Alzheimer's disease.

== Awards and honors ==
- 1986-1990 – Pew Scholar Award, Pew Charitable Trusts
- 1987-1989 – Basil O’Connor Starter Scholar Award, March of Dimes
- 1990-1995 – Rita Allen Scholars Award, Rita Allen Foundation
- 1994-2001 – Javits Neuroscience Investigator Award, NIH
- 2001 – Fellow, American Association for the Advancement of Science
- 2025 – Member, National Academy of Science

== Selected articles ==
- Gassmann, M., Casagranda, F., Orioli, D., Simon, H., Lai, C., Klein, R., & Lemke, G. (1995). Aberrant neural and cardiac development in mice lacking the ErbB4 neuregulin receptor. Nature, 378(6555), 390-394.
- Stitt, T. N., Conn, G., Goret, M., Lai, C., Bruno, J., Radzlejewski, C., ... & Yancopoulos, G. D. (1995). The anticoagulation factor protein S and its relative, Gas6, are ligands for the Tyro 3/Axl family of receptor tyrosine kinases. Cell, 80(4), 661-670.
- Lu, Q., & Lemke, G. (2001). Homeostatic regulation of the immune system by receptor tyrosine kinases of the Tyro 3 family. Science, 293(5528), 306-311.
- Stefansson, H., Petursson, H., Sigurdsson, E., Steinthorsdottir, V., Bjornsdottir, S., Sigmundsson, T., ... & Stefansson, K. (2002). Neuregulin 1 and susceptibility to schizophrenia. The American Journal of Human Genetics, 71(4), 877-892.
- Rothlin, C. V., Ghosh, S., Zuniga, E. I., Oldstone, M. B., & Lemke, G. (2007). TAM receptors are pleiotropic inhibitors of the innate immune response. Cell, 131(6), 1124-1136.
- Fourgeaud, L., Través, P. G., Tufail, Y., Leal-Bailey, H., Lew, E. D., Burrola, P. G., ... & Lemke, G. (2016). TAM receptors regulate multiple features of microglial physiology. Nature, 532(7598), 240-244.
- Huang, Y., Happonen, K. E., Burrola, P. G., O’Connor, C., Hah, N., Huang, L., ... & Lemke, G. (2021). Microglia use TAM receptors to detect and engulf amyloid β plaques. Nature immunology, 22(5), 586-594.
