= Jonathan Björklund =

Swedish ice hockey player

- Born: May 1, 1994 (age 31) Sweden
- Height: 5 ft 10 in (178 cm)
- Weight: 187 lb (85 kg; 13 st 5 lb)
- Position: Left wing
- Shoots: Left
- SHL team: Brynäs IF
- Playing career: 2013–present

Jonathan Björklund (born May 1, 1994) is a Swedish ice hockey player. He is currently playing with Brynäs IF of the Swedish Hockey League (SHL).

Björklund made his Swedish Hockey League debut playing with Brynäs IF during the 2013–14 SHL season.
