= Elina Sheremey =

Swedish gymnast (born 2006)

- Sheremey in 2024

Personal information
- Born: December 3, 2006 (age 19) Upsala, Sweden

Gymnastics career
- Discipline: Rhythmic gymnastics
- Country represented: Sweden; (2020-present)
- Club: GCF Uppsala
- Head coach: Katarina Jonsson Soderberg
Medal record
Representing Sweden
Event	1st	2nd	3rd
Nordic Championships	0	2	4
Total	0	2	4

Elina Sheremey (born 3 December 2006) is a Swedish rhythmic gymnast. She represents Sweden in international competitions.

== Career ==
=== Junior ===
Sheremey took 5th place at the 2020 Swedish Championships among juniors. At the Nordic Championships she won bronze in teams. The following year she won gold at nationals.

=== Senior ===
She became age eligible for senior competitions in 2022. She made her international debut at Miss Valentine, being 4th in the final. At the Swedish Championships she won silver in the All-Around. In May she was called up for the Nordic Championships. A month later, she represented Sweden with her teammates Emma Goeransson and Alva Svennbeck at the European Championships in Tel Aviv, being 68th with hoops and 60th with ball. In October she helped her club win the Swedish team championships alongside Alva Svennbeck, Agnes Hagberg, Emma Göransson and Maja Isaksson.

She was confirmed into the national team in January 2023. In May she made her World Cup debut in Portimão, being 48th in the All-Around. Later she competed with ball in the European Championships in Baku, taking 55th place with the apparatus.At nationals she won gold with ball, silver with clubs and bronze with ribbon.

In January 2024 she was selected for the Nordic Championships. There she won bronze in teams, with hoop and with ball. At the World Cup in Sofia she was 56th overall, 56th with hoop, 49th with ball, 56th with clubs and 51st with ribbon. Later she became the national All-Around champion. In May she competed at the European Championships in Budapest along Josefine Engstrand and Linnea Magdeburg, being 59th in the All-Around. Taking part in the Swedish team championships she won gold in teams, with ball and with ribbon, silver with hoop and with clubs. At the World Challenge Cup in Portimão she took 36th place in the All-Around, 36th with hoop, 33rd with ball, 36th with clubs and 36th with ribbon.

The following year she started her season at the World Cup in Portimão, being 32nd overall. Then she was called up to compete at the 2025 European Championships in Tallinn, taking 60th place in the qualifying round. Later she won gold in the All-Around, with hoop and with ball, silver with clubs and ribbon, at nastionals. At Milan's World Cup stage she finished in 46th place. In August she was selected for her maiden World Championships in Rio de Jainero, there she was 61st in the All-Around, 62nd with hoop, 66th with ball, 52nd with clubs and 72nd witn ribbon. In October she won gold again at the national team championships. Following these results she was awarded the "Distinguished Gymnast" honorary prize by the federation.

In March 2026 she participated in the Nordic Championships, winning silver with ribbon and in teams (along Josefine Engstrand, Anastasiia Nechitaylo, Linnea Magdeburg and Melanie Christov). In April she won silver in the All-Around, behind Nechitaylo, at the Swedish Championships, as well as with hoop and with ribbon, and gold with ball and in the clubs final. She was initially selected to compete at the European Championships in Varna, but had to withdraw and was substituted by Melanie Christov.
