= Elina Kahla =

Finnish philologist and academic (born 1960)

- Born: 24 April 1960; Espoo Finland
- Occupations: philologist, author

Elina Kahla is a Finnish philologist, academic and independent author affiliated with the Aleksanteri Institute at the University of Helsinki. She was the former President of the St. Petersburg EUNIC in 2015-2016 and Director of the Finnish Institute in St. Petersburg in 2012–2016.

Kahla matriculated in 1979 (Helsingin Suomalainen yhteiskoulu SYK); completed a Master of Arts at Helsinki University in 1985, Licentiate in 2001 and a doctorate in 2007. She worked as a freelance travel guide, translator, interpreter and teacher. From 1991 to 1996, she worked at Aalto Executive Education as project manager and consult. From 1996 to 2012, Kahla worked for the Aleksanteri Institute at the University of Helsinki, and from 2009 as an associate professor at the UH with a focus on Russian cultural history. She was also a fellow (2012-2017) at the Center of Excellence in Russian Studies funded by the Academy of Finland.

== Selected publications ==
=== Articles ===
- The Russian Orthodox Church Today: Transformations between secular and sacred. - Philosophical and Cultural Interpretations of Russian Modernisation. Ed. by Arto Mustajoki and Katja Lehtisaari.Routledge.2017. p. 59-74.
- "Keitä me olemme? Keihin me kuulumme? Suomi - Ortodoksia - Venäjänkielisyys" Ortodoksia v. 64, p. 7-41. (2015) (In Finnish)
- "Отшельники Импиваары возващаются к общинной жизни (предисловие к А. Киви Семеро братьев)" Семеро братьев St. Petersburg: Limbus, p 6. (2014) (in Russian)
- "Civil religion in Russia A choice for Russian modernization?" Baltic Worlds, September 2014, Vol VII 2–3, p. 56-64. (in English)
- "Why are Hegumen Paisii and St Maria of Paris not Included in the ROC Calendar of Saints? Orthodox Paradoxes: Heterogeneities and Complexities in Contemporary Russian Orthodoxy. Tolstaya, K. (ed.). Amsterdam: Brill, p. 154-166 13 p. (Brill's Series in Church History and Religious Culture; vol. 66) (in English)
- "The new female saints of Russia" Northern Byzantine Icons. Usvasalo, M. & Hicks, M. (eds.). Helsinki: Suomen Bysanttikomitea ry, Vol. 2014, p 19 (in English)
- "Venäjän uudet pyhät naiset" Bysantin kuva Pohjolassa. Usvasalo, M. (ed.). 1 ed. Helsinki: Suomen Bysanttikomitea ry, Vol. 2014, p. 19 (In Finnish)
- "Kaupunki muistaa keisaria: Romanovien dynastian 400 vuotta" Venäjän aika. 2013, 3, p. 24-27 4 p. (In Finnish)
- "Aitoa kohtaamassa" Yliopisto: Helsingin yliopiston tiedelehti 2013, 4, p. 46-48 3 p. (In Finnish)
- "Жизнь и подвиг св. преподобномученицы Елисаветы Феодоровны: между традицией и современностью" Романовы в истории. Пятые Феодоритовские чтения. Badanin, I. M. (ed.). 1 ed. Murmansk, St. Petersburg: Ladan, Vol. 2013, p. 248-259 12 p (in Russian)

=== Books ===
- Gulagin viisas, Helsinki: Into (2025)
- Sandarmohista Skolkovoon (co-ed.with Kaarina Aitamurto and Jussi Lassila). Helsinki: Into (2020).
- Petsamon marttyyri ja maailman pohjoisin luostari Helsinki: SKS (2020)
- Between utopia and apocalypse : essays on social theory and Russia Helsinki: Aleksanteri Institute. (2011) (In English)
- Tuli ja valo: kertomuksia pyhistä naisista Helsinki: Maahenki. (2010) (in Finnish)
- The unlimited gaze: essays in honour of professor Natalia Baschmakoff Helsinki: Aleksanteri Institute. (2009) (In English)
- Life as exploit: representations of twentieth-century saintly women in Russia Helsinki: Kikimora Publications, (2007) (in English)
- Мой Питер: эссе финских авторов/Moĭ Piter: ėsse finskikh avtorov Sankt-Peterburg: Izd. dom "Kolo" (2004)(in Russian)
