= MERTK =

Protein-coding gene in humans

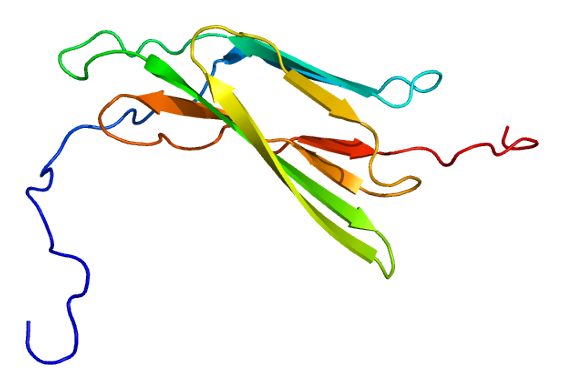

Identifiers
- Aliases: MERTK, MER, RP38, c-mer, Tyro12, c-Eyk, MER proto-oncogene, tyrosine kinase
- External IDs: OMIM: 604705; MGI: 96965; GeneCards: MERTK
Available structures
PDB	Ortholog search: PDBe RCSB
PDB	List of PDB id codes 2DBJ, 2P0C, 3BPR, 3BRB, 3TCP, 4M3Q, 4MH7, 4MHA
Enzyme activity
EC #	BRENDA	ExPASy	KEGG	MetaCyc
2.7.10.1	↗	↗	↗	↗

Gene location (Human)
Chr.	Chromosome 2 (human)
Band	2q13	Start	111,898,607 bp
Band	2q13	End	112,029,561 bp

Gene location (Mouse)
Chr.	Chromosome 2 (mouse)
Band	2|2 F1	Start	128,540,876 bp
Band	2|2 F1	End	128,644,814 bp
RNA expression pattern
Bgee	Human / Mouse (ortholog); Top expressed in: right adrenal cortex; gastric mucosa; left adrenal gland; left adrenal cortex; popliteal artery; tibial arteries; Descending thoracic aorta; ascending aorta; left coronary artery; spleen / Top expressed in: stroma of bone marrow; tunica media of zone of aorta; retinal pigment epithelium; jejunum; ascending aorta; ileum; body of femur; spleen; duodenum; right kidney; More reference expression data
BioGPS	n/a
Gene ontology
Molecular function	ATP binding; protein tyrosine kinase activity; protein kinase activity; protein binding; transmembrane receptor protein tyrosine kinase activity; kinase activity; nucleotide binding; transferase activity; receptor tyrosine kinase; transmembrane signaling receptor activity; Wnt-protein binding
Cellular component	integral component of membrane; photoreceptor outer segment; rhabdomere; membrane; integral component of plasma membrane; plasma membrane; cytoplasm; extracellular space; receptor complex
Biological process	spermatogenesis; vagina development; protein kinase B signaling; natural killer cell differentiation; cell surface receptor signaling pathway; protein phosphorylation; platelet activation; cell-cell signaling; positive regulation of phagocytosis; apoptotic cell clearance; substrate adhesion-dependent cell spreading; leukocyte migration; negative regulation of lymphocyte activation; phosphorylation; retina development in camera-type eye; negative regulation of leukocyte apoptotic process; phagocytosis; secretion by cell; peptidyl-tyrosine phosphorylation; negative regulation of cytokine production; neutrophil clearance; negative regulation of signal transduction; Wnt signaling pathway; cell differentiation; negative regulation of apoptotic process; positive regulation of ERK1 and ERK2 cascade; transmembrane receptor protein tyrosine kinase signaling pathway; nervous system development; cell migration
Sources:Amigo / QuickGO
Orthologs
Databases	NCBI: entry; OMA: entry
Species	Human	Mouse
Entrez	10461	17289
Ensembl	ENSG00000153208	ENSMUSG00000014361
UniProt	Q12866	Q60805
RefSeq (mRNA)	NM_006343	NM_008587
RefSeq (protein)	NP_006334	NP_032613
Location (UCSC)	Chr 2: 111.9 – 112.03 Mb	Chr 2: 128.54 – 128.64 Mb
PubMed search
- Wikidata
View/Edit Human	View/Edit Mouse

Proto-oncogene tyrosine-protein kinase MER is an enzyme that in humans is encoded by the MERTK gene.

== Function ==
This gene is a member of the TYRO3/AXL/MER (TAM) receptor kinase family and encodes a transmembrane protein with two fibronectin type-III domains, two Ig-like C2-type (immunoglobulin-like) domains, and one tyrosine kinase domain. Mutations in this gene have been associated with disruption of the retinal pigment epithelium (RPE) phagocytosis pathway and onset of autosomal recessive retinitis pigmentosa (RP).
