= Benjamin Björklund =

Swedish painter

- Born: Benjamin Björklund; December 28, 1986 (age 39); Trollhättan, Sweden
- Occupation: Artist

Benjamin Björklund (born 28 December 1986 in Trollhättan, Sweden) is a Swedish painter. Björklund is a self-taught artist whose work includes classic figurative painting. He primarily paints people and animals, with the subjects often being completely alone. His work is inspired by the cold mood of the Skagen Painters.

== Personal life ==
Björklund studied to become a veterinary technician and has briefly worked as both a prison night guard and a psychiatric nurse.

== Exhibitions ==
=== Solo exhibitions ===
- 2012 Trollhättans Konsthall
- 2014 Studio The, London

=== Group exhibitions ===
- 2012 Liljevalchs Vårsalong
