= Ulrika Björklund =

Swedish politician

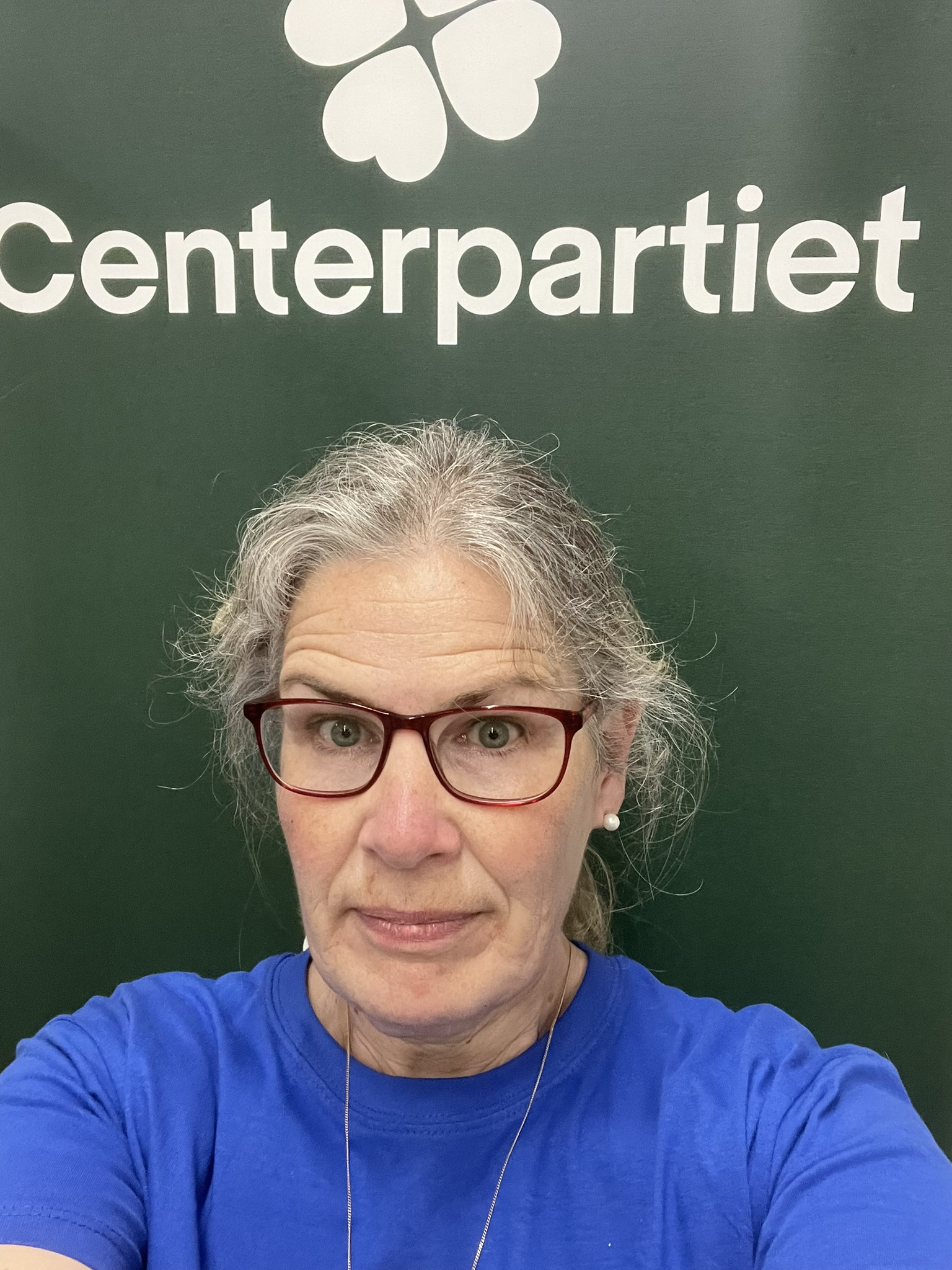
- Björklund in 2024

Personal details
- Born: Ulrika Holmström; 5 October 1967 (age 59) Lidingö, Sweden
- Party: Moderate Party (until 2022); Centre Party (since 2022)

Ulrika Josefina Björklund (born October 5, 1967) is a Swedish psychologist and politician of the Centre Party.

== History ==
Björklund has worked in several different fields over the years, originally training as a sociologist, but has gradually shifted her focus toward other professions, primarily politics.

In 2018, after a period of turbulence at the Kullängen elderly care home, Björklund temporarily took on the role of acting unit manager following the resignation of both previous managers. Initially planned as a six-month interim appointment, she chose to apply for the position herself after recognizing that the role aligned with her professional background. As a trained social worker with years of experience as a counselor and leader, she focused on stabilizing the organization, improving staff schedules, and reviving workplace improvement initiatives. Despite initial concerns about how staff would receive a politician in a leadership role, Björklund was met with a warm and cooperative response. During her tenure, she stepped back from certain political duties, particularly those related to the social and labor market committee.

Until 2020, Björklund worked for Örebro County as a psychologist, having been appointed head of psychiatry in southern Närke the previous year. During her tenure, she faced opposition due to her political involvement, which ultimately led to her decision to resign and establish her own psychiatric practice.

Björklund was the party representative for the Moderate Party in the Hallsberg municipal council prior to the 2022 Swedish general election after which she switched to the Centre Party in protest of the Moderate Party aligning themselves with the Sweden Democrats.

She regained her role as a party representative in the Hallsberg municipal council in 2024, this time for the Centre Party.
