= Elina (Epirus) =

Coordinates: 39.3300°N 20.2940°E

Epirus in antiquity

Elina (Greek: Ελίνα) was an ancient Greek, Hellenistic fortified town in the region of Epirus.

The site is known locally as Dymokastro, west of the village of Perdika. Hammond discussed the site and identified it with ancient Elina. It overlooked the site of the Battle of Syvota between Corcyra (modern Corfu) and Corinth at the start of the Peloponnesian War and was the largest naval battle between Greek city states until that time and was one of the immediate catalysts for the war.

The city flourished from the Late Classical to the Roman times and was named after the Thesprotean tribe of Elinoi that lived in the region. It is estimated that, during the period of its peak, the population of the city reached 6000. The walls are reinforced by rectangular towers and date to the 4th century BC. The west wall was added in the Hellenistic period in order to incorporate the little port into the fortified area. Throughout the settlement are visible foundations of buildings, some of which are hewn from the rock, as well as cisterns, while at the centre of the hilltop is an open space ("Acropolis A") around which were probably clustered the public buildings of the city.

Pausanias may have mentioned the sweet water of this site.

The visible fortifications on Dymokastro date to the Hellenistic period and was excavated over a series of campaigns at the end of the 20th century.

Finds are exhibited at the Archaeological Museum of Igoumenitsa.

== See also ==
- List of cities in ancient Epirus
