= Elina Björklund =

Finnish business executive

Elina Björklund (born 1970) is a Finnish business executive. She was appointed chief executive officer of the Nordic children's clothing company Reima Oy in 2012.

== Background ==
Björklund graduated from the Helsinki School of Economics and Business Administration with a Master of Science in Economics degree in 1994, having been Secretary of Foreign Affairs in the school's student union from 1991 to 1992. She received an MBA degree in Finance at the City University Business School in London in 1993 and from 2001 to 2003 studied at the University of Art and Design, Helsinki University of Technology and Helsinki School of Economics in business management.

== Career ==
Björklund became a Member of the Board of the Finnish Society of Financial Analysts in 1996, and served as its Chairman from 1998 to 1999. She was Vice Chairman of the Financial Council and Chairman of the Finance and Investment Committee of the Student Union of the Helsinki School of Economics (KY) from 2001 to 2005. She has served as a board member of various institutions, including Art and Design City Oy in Helsinki from 2006 to 2008 and Finnair Plc from 2009 to 2012. In 2012 she became the CEO of the Nordic children's clothing company Reima Oy, a successful Finnish firm in its field which was founded in 1944. Under Björklund, Reima has expanded internationally and has been established in China and Russia.
