= List of dystopian films =

This is a list of dystopian films. Dystopian societies appear in many speculative fiction works and are often found within the science fiction and fantasy genres. Dystopias are often characterized by dehumanization, authoritarian governments, ruthless megacorporations, environmental disasters, or other characteristics associated with a dramatic decline in society.

== List ==
| Title | Year | Comments | References |
|---|---|---|---|
| 12 Monkeys | 1995 | A convict is sent back in time to gather information about a virus responsible for wiping out most of the human population. Based on Chris Marker's short film, La Jetée (1962). | |
| 984: Prisoner of the Future | 1982 | The election of the extremist Dr. Fontaine in Canada brings about a totalitarian regime, upon which businessman Tom Weston and others are taken prisoner on suspicion of being part a counter-revolutionary plot. The suave prison warden (Don Francks) focuses his interrogations on Weston - who had ironically refused a proposition by business interests to kill Fontaine before his inaugural. | |
| 1984 | 1956 | A bureaucrat falls in love in a futuristic, totalitarian, surveillance state. Loosely based on George Orwell's novel, Nineteen-Eighty-Four (1949). | |
| 2081 | 2009 | Short-film adaptation of Kurt Vonnegut's, Harrison Bergeron (1961). "Everyone is finally equal". | |
| A.I. Artificial Intelligence | 2001 | Based on Brian Aldiss' short story, Supertoys Last All Summer Long (1969). A distraught family is given a robotic boy with "real" emotions but is misunderstood by the rest of society. | |
| Æon Flux | 2005 | Aeon Flux is a mysterious assassin working for the Monicans, a group of rebels trying to overthrow the government. Loosely based on Peter Chung's animated TV series, Æon Flux (1991). | |
| The Age of Stupid | 2009 | An unnamed archivist (Pete Postlethwaite) lives alone in the devastated world of 2055, looks back at "archive" footage from 2007, asking "Why didn't we stop climate change when we had the chance?" | |
| Pendatang | 2023 | A Cantonese–speaking Chinese family was forced to relocate to a rural kampong home, not long after Malaysia was turned into a military dictatorship and where racial segregation between the ethnic groups of the country became strictly enforced. | |
| Akira | 1988 | An anime-film, directed by Katsuhiro Otomo (based on his manga of the same name), set after Tokyo is destroyed in 1988 and is rebuilt as "Neo-Tokyo." In 2019, a secret Japan Self-Defense Forces project endangers Neo-Tokyo when it turns a biker gang member into a rampaging, psychic psychopath. | |
| Alita: Battle Angel | 2019 | Alita, an amnesiac cyborg girl who sets out to learn about her destiny after she awakens in a new body with no past memory of who she is. | |
| Alphaville | 1965 | A secret agent, is sent to the distant-space city of Alphaville, where he must find a missing person and free the city from its tyrannical ruler. | |
| The Animatrix | 2003 | Movie shorts set in The Matrix's universe. | |
| Antiviral | 2012 | In a blackly satirical near-future, a thriving industry sells celebrity illnesses to their obsessed fans. One employee attempts to exploit the system, only to have it backfire when they involve him in a potentially deadly mystery. | |
| Atlas Shrugged: Part I Atlas Shrugged: Part II; Atlas Shrugged Part III: Who Is John Galt? | 2011; 2012; 2014 | Based on Ayn Rand 1957 novel. An alliance of the industrious forms to fight the increasingly authoritarian government of the United States that believes it is best to dictate what is produced (both materialistic and idealistic). | |
| Automata | 2014 | In a not-so-distant future, primitive humanoid robots, called Pilgrims, are built to operate in the harsh environment. Unable to stop the advance of desertification, they are relegated to manual labor. An insurance agent of a robotics corporation, who investigates cases of robots violating their primary protocols against altering themselves, makes a discovery which will have profound consequences for the future of humanity. | |
| Babylon A.D. | 2008 | Veteran-turned-mercenary Toorop takes the high-risk job of escorting a woman from Russia to America. Little does he know that she is host to an organism that a cult wants to harvest, in order to produce a genetically modified Messiah. | |
| Batman | 1989 | Based on the DC Comics character of the same name, directed by Tim Burton. Gotham City is a place overrun with disorder, where the reclusive billionaire Bruce Wayne fights crime as the masked vigilante Batman. Trying to stop a raid on Axis Chemicals, he unwittingly causes a gangster, Jack Napier, to fall into a tank of acid thereby causing his transformation into the demented Joker. | |
| Battle Royale | 2000 | Based on the novel and manga of the same name. | |
| Battlefield Earth | 2000 | Film adaptation of L. Ron Hubbard's 1982 novel, starring John Travolta. In year 3000, mankind lives enslaved for the past millennium by the alien empire of Psychlos. A man named Jonnie Goodboy Tyler, who rejects the hopeless of the rest of human beings, leads a riot to recover the planet, destroy the Psychlo homeworld with recovered American nuclear weapons, and free the human race. | |
| Blade Runner | 1982 | Loosely based on Philip K. Dick's novel Do Androids Dream of Electric Sheep? (1968). In 2019, a former Blade Runner named Rick Deckard is called out of retirement for a final job: locate and execute a group of Replicants - genetically modified human clones designed as laborers in space colonies - who have illegally returned to Earth from outer space, led by Roy Batty, who tries desperately to meet his creator, CEO and businessman Eldon Tyrell. | |
| Blade Runner 2049 | 2017 | Sequel to Blade Runner, directed by Denis Villeneuve. In 2049, KD6-3.7 is a new-model Replicant that works as a Blade Runner, executing obsolete models of Replicants. On his final job, he discovers evidence implying the existence of legendary Blade Runner and long-since-missing Rick Deckard, unaware that oligarch Niander Wallace is also interested to locate Deckard before K. | |
| Blindness | 2008 | Adaptation of the 1995 novel of the same name by Portuguese author José Saramago, about a society suffering an epidemic of blindness. | |
| The Blood of Heroes | 1989 | "In a post-apocalyptic world there is a violent game, similar to football, that has become a way of life." | |
| The Book of Eli | 2010 | A post-apocalyptic tale, in which a lone man fights his way across America, in order to protect a sacred book that holds the secrets to saving humankind. | |
| The Bothersome Man | 2006 | In a strange city where every person seems content beyond reason a new man arrives in town and stirs up trouble by asking too many questions. | |
| A Boy and His Dog | 1974 | Focus on the survival of a boy and an intelligent dog on post-apocalyptical wasteland in 2024. Based on the 1969 cycle of narratives by fantasy author Harlan Ellison titled "A Boy and His Dog". | |
| Brave New World | 1980 | In a futuristic totalitarian society, people have no control of their roles in society or lives/destiny. Based in the 1932 novel by Aldous Huxley. | |
| Brazil | 1985 | A bureaucrat in a retro-future world tries to correct an administrative error and himself becomes an enemy of the state. | |
| Cargo | 2009 | It is the year 2267. After the Earth has become uninhabitable due to an ecological collapse, the remaining people live on overcrowded space stations in Earth's orbit. The story takes place on the derelict spaceship on its eight year journey to a remote freight-station in deep space. | |
| Casshern | 2004 | Film adaptation of the 1973 anime series of the same name. | |
| CHAPPiE | 2015 | The film was directed by Neill Blomkamp (who also directed District 9) and based on his short film Tetra Vaal (2004). In it the South African government purchases a squadron of high-tech, autonomous robots (AI) in response to a record high crime rate in Johannesburg and uses them as a mechanized police force. One of these police droids, "Chappie", is stolen and given new programming which causes him to be the first robot with the ability to think and feel for himself. | |
| Cherry 2000 | 1987 | When a successful businessman finds that his android wife, Cherry model 2000 has blown a fuse, he hires a sexy renegade tracker to help him find her exact duplicate. | |
| Children of Men | 2006 | Directed by Alfonso Cuarón, based on P. D. James' 1992 novel of the same name. In 2027, a chaotic world in which women have somehow become infertile, a former activist agrees to help transport a miraculously pregnant woman to a sanctuary at sea. | |
| City of Ember | 2008 | After an unspecified catastrophe on Earth, in which the remaining generations are sent to an underground world to live until the earth surface can support life, an unfortunate set of circumstances keeps them underground for longer than planned. They eventually find their way out after two brave children discover the way. | |
| The City of Lost Children | 1995 | French film directed by Jean-Pierre Jeunet. In a surrealist world, a scientist named Krank is kidnapping children to steal their dreams, in the hope that these dreams can slow or stop his aging process. When Krank and his clones kidnap Denree, Denree's older brother, One, sets out to find him. | |
| Civil War | 2024 | A film crew of embedded journalists, led by a renowned war photographer, travels across a war-torn, dystopian United States during a near-future Second American Civil War to get an interview with the President before the Western Forces reach Washington D.C.. | |
| A Clockwork Orange | 1971 | Adapted from Anthony Burgess' 1962 novella of the same name. In a future England overrun by violent gangs and ruled by an increasingly authoritarian government, a hoodlum gang leader is brainwashed into subservience as an experimental "cure" for criminality. | |
| Cloud Atlas | 2012 | Adapted from the 2004 novel of the same name by David Mitchell. Set across six different eras (1849, 1936, 1973, 2012, 2144 and 2321), the movie tells the story of a group of souls crossing each other's paths along different incarnations, and how it changes the world accordingly as time passes. | |
| Code 46 | 2003 | A futuristic 'Brief Encounter', a love story in which the romance is doomed by genetic incompatibility. | |
| Colossus: The Forbin Project | 1970 | The film, based upon Dennis Feltham Jones' science fiction novel Colossus (1966), is about a massive American defense computer, named Colossus, becoming sentient. Colossus logically follows its original directives, to the dismay of its programmers, by assuming control of the world and all human affairs for the good of mankind during the Cold War threat of nuclear war. | |
| The Congress | 2013 | The Congress is a late-capitalist dystopia, in which a corporate media behemoth "Miramount" has effectively usurped control of all human consciousness. An aging actress decides to scan her body to sign over to Miramount Studios, which allows the company to digitize every trait that she possesses and use it in any movie they choose. The hallucinogenic live-action/animation film represents corporate interests taking advantage of the individual and was partly inspired by Stanisław Lem's novel, The Futurological Congress. | |
| The Cybernetic Grandma | 1962 | A 1962 Czechoslovak surreal science-fiction-horror film using stop-motion puppet animation, the film depicts a dystopian situation, in which machines tend humans into a cybernetic lifestyle. | |
| Dark City | 1998 | A man struggles with memories of his past, including a wife he cannot remember, in a nightmarish world with no sun, run by beings with telekinetic powers who seek the souls of humans. | |
| Dark Metropolis | 2010 | Mankind has lost a 300-year war against a genetically enhanced race that man created, abused and finally tortured. Now the descendants of that race - known as the 'Ghen' control planet Earth from advanced underground cities. | |
| Dawn of the Planet of the Apes | 2014 | Ten years after the pandemic of the deadly ALZ-113 virus, or Simian Flu, the worldwide human population has been drastically reduced, with only about one in five hundred genetically immune to the virus. Apes, with genetically enhanced intelligence caused by the same virus, have started to build a civilization of their own. Caesar is the chimpanzee leader of an ape colony in the Muir Woods near San Francisco. Caesar's son Blue Eyes and his friend Ash encounter a man named Carver in the woods, who panics and shoots Ash, wounding him. Carver's party, led by Malcolm, arrive while a number of apes join Blue Eyes and Ash. Caesar orders the humans to leave, and they flee to their community in San Francisco, centered around "the tower", a partially finished skyscraper. Prompted by Koba, a bonobo holding a grudge against humans for experimental mistreatment. | |
| The Day the Earth Caught Fire | 1961 | One of the classic apocalyptic films of its era, this film depicts the United States and the Soviet Union unwittingly testing atomic bombs at the same time, altering the Earth's axis of rotation. | |
| Daybreakers | 2009 | In the year 2019, a plague has transformed almost every human into vampires. Faced with a dwindling blood supply, the fractured dominant race plots their survival. | |
| Dead End Drive-In | 1986 | A teenage couple is trapped in a drive-in theater which is really a concentration camp for societal rejects. The inmates are fed a steady diet of junk food, new wave music, drugs, and violent films. | |
| Dead Man's Letters | 1986 | In the aftermath of nuclear apocalypse, a group of people are forced to live underground in bunkers. They cannot go outside their dwellings without wearing protective clothing and gas masks. They try to find hope in the disturbing new world. Among these people is a history teacher who tries to contact via letters his missing son. | |
| Death Race | 2008 | Remake of the film Death Race 2000 (1975). Ex-con Jensen Ames is forced by the warden of a notorious prison to compete in our post-industrial world's most popular sport: a car race in which inmates must brutalize and kill one another on the road to victory. | |
| Death Race 2000 | 1975 | The film takes place in a dystopian American society in the year 2000, where the murderous Transcontinental Road Race has become a form of national entertainment. | |
| Death Watch | 1980 | Based on the novel The Unsleeping Eye by David G. Compton, set in a future where death from illness has become extremely unusual. When the protagonist is diagnosed as having an incurable disease, she becomes a celebrity and is besieged by journalists. | |
| Demolition Man | 1993 | A long imprisoned ultra-violent criminal is brought out of suspended animation by a new "perfect" future society's leader as an unsanctioned solution to its unwanted dissidents. In response, a long imprisoned rogue cop is brought out of suspended animation by the new "perfect" future police department as their solution to the problem. | |
| Le Dernier Combat (English title: The Last Battle) | 1983 | A dark vision of post-apocalyptic survival, the film was shot in black and white and contains only two words of dialogue. It depicts a world where people have been rendered mute by some unknown incident. | |
| Diary of a Pig War | 1975 | In a dystopian Argentina, a cult of young people has taken to murdering the elderly - whom they refer to as "useless pigs." Before long, the increasingly radicalized sect targets a group of middle-aged friends. | |
| District 9 | 2009 | An extraterrestrial race forced to live in slum-like conditions on Earth suddenly finds a kindred spirit in a government agent who is exposed to their biotechnology. | |
| Divergent | 2014 | Based on the adaption of Veronica Roth's novels of the same names. In a world divided by factions based on virtues, Tris learns she's Divergent and won't fit in. | |
| The Divergent Series: Insurgent | 2015 | After the series of events and death of her parents in Divergent, Tris Prior tries to figure out what the Abnegation were trying to protect and why the Erudite leaders will do anything to stop them. | |
| The Divergent Series: Allegiant | 2016 | Set in a post-apocalyptic and dystopian Chicago, the story follows Tris Prior, her boyfriend Four, and their small group of friends escaping over the wall that enclosed the city. Once outside, however, they discover new truths that will shift their alliances and introduce new threats. | |
| Downstream | 2010 | Takes place in a near-future dystopia where gasoline is scarce and a drifter tries to reach a rumored utopian city, Plutopia, powered by clean energy. | |
| Dr. Mabuse the Gambler | 1922 | An exaggerated portrayal of Weimar Germany which the titular villain can exploit for power and profit. | |
| Dredd | 2012 | Adapted from the comic book of the same name. In a distant and irradiated future where judges also serve as jury and executioners, Judge Dredd and aspiring Judge Cassandra Anderson become trapped in a 200-story tower block (named Megatowers) by Ma-Ma, a powerful and violent drug lady, to prevent Dredd from dismantling her business and dominion in the tower block. | |
| Elysium | 2013 | In this film wealth inequality, the alienation of the super-rich and class conflict are taken to the extreme: in the year 2154, the very wealthy live on a man-made luxurious space station while the rest of the population resides on a ruined Earth. A man takes on a mission that could bring equality to the polarized worlds. It explores political and sociological themes such as immigration, overpopulation, health care, exploitation, the justice system, and social class issues. | |
| The End of Evangelion | 1997 | When the dawn of the new millennium brings destruction on Earth by means of the seemingly all-powerful angels, the only hope for the future of the human race lies in Evangelions—bio-engineered crafts created from the Angel's technology. | |
| Ender's Game | 2013 | Based on the novel of the same name by Orson Scott Card. | |
| Equalizer 2000 | 1987 | One of the several low-budget movies inspired by Mad Max made in the 1980s. Set in an Alaska a few hundred years later of a nuclear war, a ruthless and fascist vehicular group named The Ownership ruled by General MacLaine faces a rebellion that tries to destroy The Ownership to live free, but the rude Captain Slade leaves the group after Mayor Lawton kills Slade's father (The Ownership's field commander) and leaves him for dead, joining to the rebellion. Meeting Karen and her father Dixon, Slade and Dixon modify a firearm to create the massive-weapon Equalizer 2000, turning in one-man army to defeat Mayor Lawton and The Ownership. | |
| Equals | 2015 | Two people infected with a disease regain their ability to feel compassion and emotion in a society where emotions no longer exist. | |
| Equilibrium | 2002 | In a totalitarian future where all forms of feeling are illegal and citizens are required to take daily drug-injections to suppress emotion and encourage obedience, a man in charge of enforcing the law rises to overthrow the system. | |
| Escape from L.A. | 1996 | Sequel to the 1981 film, Escape from New York. In 2013, Snake Plissken is sent to the turned-in-island Los Angeles after The Big One earthquake to rescue The President's daughter, kidnapped by the revolutionary group Shining Path led by Cuervo Jones that it rules Los Angeles. | |
| Escape from New York | 1981 | In 1997, when the US President crashes into Manhattan, now a giant maximum security prison, a convicted bank robber named Snake Plissken is sent in for a rescue. It extrapolates the crime and decay of inner cities. | |
| eXistenZ | 1999 | Directed by David Cronenberg. As in Videodrome, Cronenberg gives his psychological statement about how humans react and interact with the technologies that surround them, in this case, the world of video games. | |
| Fahrenheit 451 | 1966 | Based on Ray Bradbury's novel of the same name. In an oppressive future, a fireman whose duty is to destroy all books begins to question his task. | |
| Fantastic Planet | 1973 | The story of this animated film, about humans living on a strange planet dominated by giant humanoid aliens who consider them animals, is based on the 1957 novel Oms en série by French writer Stefan Wul. | |
| FAQ: Frequently Asked Questions | 2004 | France, sometime in the near future. The Sisterhood of Metacontrol governs Europe. | |
| Fears | 1980 | A plague, in the form of a deadly skin disease, decimates Argentina's population - leaving a small group of survivors in sparsely populated Patagonia, who must fend off contagion and official searches as well as each other's worsening emotional state. | |
| The Fifth Element | 1997 | A big ball of evil, in collaboration with a corporate kingpin, plots Earth's destruction. | |
| The First Purge | 2018 | Fourth installment of The Purge's franchise and a prequel focused in the New Founding Fathers of America, a totalitarian politic party that after take the power in USA make an experiment in Staten Island where for a span of 12 hours all kind of misdemeanor and crime (murder, rape, arson, and anarchy) will be legal. | |
| Forbidden Planet | 1956 | A spaceship is sent to check on the welfare of a scientific expedition on a strange planet. Loosely based on Shakespeare's The Tempest. | |
| Fortress | 1993 | A futuristic prison movie. Protagonist and wife are nabbed at a future US emigration point with an illegal baby during population control. | |
| Freejack | 1992 | In the future, the rich extend their lives by stealing other peoples' lives. | |
| Futureworld | 1976 | Sequel to Westworld. | |
| Gamer | 2009 | In a future mind-controlling game, death row convicts are forced to battle. A convict controlled by a skilled teenage gamer must survive 30 sessions in order to be set free. | |
| Gattaca | 1997 | In this biopunk dystopia, genetic engineering creates a class of superior people and an underclass of genetically inferior (natural born) called "in-valids". In a controlled society, a dedicated in-valid assumes the identity of a superior human in order to pursue his lifelong dream of space travel. | |
| Ghost in the Shell | 1995 | Based on the 1989 manga by Masamune Shirow of the same name, follows the hunt by the public-security agency Section 9 for a mysterious hacker known as the Puppet Master. | |
| The Giver | 2014 | Based on the 1993 dystopian novel of the same name by Lois Lowry, this film adaptation is a dark, quiet, but powerful futuristic political tale in which a 16-year-old boy (the boy is only 12 in the book), must search for the truth in a world free of war, crime, disease, poverty, unfairness, and injustice. | |
| The Handmaid's Tale | 1990 | Based on the 1985 novel of the same name by Margaret Atwood, in a dystopically polluted rightwing religious tyranny, a young woman is put in sexual slavery on account of her now rare fertility. | |
| Hard to be a God | 2013 | Based on the 1964 novel of the same name by Arkady and Boris Strugatsky. A group of 30 scientists travel from Earth to a nearly-identical alien planet that is culturally and technologically centuries behind. The inhabitants of this planet have brutally suppressed a renaissance movement, murdering anybody they consider to be an intellectual, and thus the planet is stuck in the Middle Ages. | |
| Hardware | 1990 | Inspired by the short story "Shok!" in 2000 AD (1980), the film depicts the rampage of a salvaged experimental self-repairing robot in a post-apocalyptic slum. | |
| Harrison Bergeron | 1995 | A cable television movie adapted from the short story of the same name by Kurt Vonnegut. | |
| Hemet, or the Landlady Don't Drink Tea | 2023 | A ruthless landlady in a dystopian Hemet, California stops at nothing to maintain authority and power over her tenants during an epidemic. | |
| High-Rise | 2015 | Adapted from J. G. Ballard's 1975 novel of the same name, the film depicts the experiences of residents of a tower block as social rules disintegrate. Directed by Ben Wheatley. | |
| Hobo with a Shotgun | 2011 | Directed by Jason Eisener, starring Rutger Hauer in a despotic future where anarchy rules and one man with a shotgun aims to bring back some form of justice. | |
| Hotel Artemis | 2018 | A nurse runs a secret hospital for criminals in futuristic Los Angeles. | |
| The Hunger Games | 2012 | Directed by Gary Ross, based on Suzanne Collins' novel of the same name. Katniss Everdeen voluntarily takes her younger sister's place in the Hunger Games, a televised fight to the death in which two teenagers from each of the twelve Districts of Panem are chosen at random to compete. | |
| The Hunger Games: Catching Fire | 2013 | Directed by Francis Lawrence, based on Suzanne Collins' Catching Fire. | |
| The Hunger Games: Mockingjay – Part 1 | 2014 | Directed by Francis Lawrence, based on Suzanne Collins' Mockingjay. | |
| The Hunger Games: Mockingjay – Part 2 | 2015 | Directed by Francis Lawrence, based on Suzanne Collins' Mockingjay. | |
| The Hunger Games: The Ballad of Songbirds & Snakes | 2023 | Directed by Francis Lawrence, based on Suzanne Collins' The Ballad of Songbirds and Snakes. | |
| I, Robot | 2004 | Adapted from the I, Robot series by Isaac Asimov. An A.I. creates a potential dystopian future by logically applying the Zeroth Law of Robotics but is stopped. | |
| Idaho Transfer | 1973 | Directed by Peter Fonda in his directorial debut and starring Keith Carradine. | |
| Idiocracy | 2006 | An average man is selected for a top-secret hibernation program. When he wakes up 500 years later to discover he's the smartest person in a radically dumbed-down society. | |
| In Time | 2011 | In 2169, future people stop aging past 25 so time has become the universal currency traded between people. When the time "bank account" on an implanted clock reaches zero, that impoverished person "times out" and is euthanized. | |
| The Inhabited Island | 2009 | Based on the 1969 book Prisoners of Power by the Strugatskies. The most expensive Russian science fiction film to date (2015) is set on another planet, with a country that is ruled by a totalitarian regime that brainwashes its citizens by towers that send a special kind of radiation erected across the country. | |
| Invasion of the Body Snatchers | 1956 | Based on the 1955 novel The Body Snatchers by Jack Finney, depicts an extraterrestrial invasion that begins in the fictional California town of Santa Mira. Dr. Miles Bennell and his friends discover vegetal cocoons that prove to be an alien race that duplicate human beings when they sleep. | |
| Invasion of the Body Snatchers | 1978 | Remake of 1956 film, which is based on the novel The Body Snatchers by Jack Finney. A public health inspector realizes that an alien vegetal spores, that have arrived on the planet, are replicating human beings when they are asleep and consuming their original bodies to take over their lives. | |
| Isle of Dogs | 2018 | A young boy searching for his dog after the species is banished to an island following the outbreak of a canine flu. | |
| The Island | 2005 | A man goes on the run after he discovers that he is actually a "harvestable being", and is being kept as a source of replacement parts, along with others, in a facility. | |
| La Jetée | 1962 | In the aftermath of World War III scientists in Paris research time travel, hoping to send test subjects to different time periods "to call past and future to the rescue of the present". The short film by Chris Marker was constructed almost entirely from still photos and inspired the 1995 film 12 Monkeys. | |
| Johnny Mnemonic | 1995 | Based on the 1981 short story of the same name by William Gibson, in which a data courier, literally carrying a data package inside his head, must deliver it before he dies from the burden or is killed by the Yakuza. | |
| Judge Dredd | 1995 | Based on the comic of the same name: in a dystopian future, Dredd, the most famous judge (a cop with instant field judiciary powers) is convicted for a crime he did not commit while his murderous counterpart escapes. | |
| Kin-dza-dza! | 1986 | A 1986 Soviet sci-fi dystopian black comedy cult film. | |
| Land of the Blind | 2006 | A dark political satire, based on several incidents throughout history in which tyrannical rulers were overthrown by new leaders who proved to be just as bad, if not worse, and subtle references are made to several such cases. | |
| The Last Man on Earth | 1964 | The first of three adaptations of Richard Matheson's 1954 novel I Am Legend. A scientist tries to survive in an apocalyptic world, where a global disease has turned humans into light-sensitive "vampires". | |
| The Lego Movie | 2014 | Animation based on the Lego line of construction toys, tells the story of an ordinary Lego minifigure as he ends up becoming involved in a resistance against a tyrannical businessman who plans to glue everything in the Lego worlds. | |
| Lipton Cockton in the Shadows of Sodoma | 1995 | In 2037, a private investigator Lipton Cockton, living in a near-future federal state, begins to investigate unexplained explosion deaths while experiencing a journey from a decayed social system and a failed human life towards the light of reality. | |
| The Lobster | 2015 | Somewhere in the near future, single people face a choice: join a program to find a mate in forty-five days or be transformed into an animal. | |
| Logan's Run | 1976 | Depicts a dystopian future society set in 2274 in which population and the consumption of resources are managed by the simple notion of killing everyone who reaches the age of thirty. | |
| The Long Walk | 2025 | In a dystopian future, teenage boys must participate in a high-stakes, cross-country walking contest where they are executed if they fall below a certain speed. | |
| Looper | 2012 | In 2074, when the mob wants to get rid of someone, the target is sent into the past, where a hired gun awaits - someone like Joe - who one day learns the mob wants to 'close the loop' by sending back Joe's future self for assassination. | |
| Lo que vendrá | 1988 | Argentina, in the near future, is ruled by a police state. During a protest in Buenos Aires, a bystander (Hugo Soto) is accidentally shot by an ambitious policeman (Juan Leyrado) - whose career becomes threatened by persistent inquiries from the victim's father, as well as official disapproval. The cop soon has an added problem in the form of a watchful ambulance driver (Charly García), who provokes him with unsettling messages and even arson on his vacation home. The victim eventually recovers from his coma - leading to a showdown with the ruthless officer. | |
| Mad Max | 1979 | A lone cop named Max Rockatansky is the only law in a future society run amok. | |
| Mad Max 2: The Road Warrior | 1981 | In a post-apocalyptic future caused after a nuclear war, Max Rockatansky arrives to a little colony to peaceful villagers who are besieged by a gang of dangerous road killers that want the fuel that the villagers produce, in the hope to travel another place to rebuild the civilization. | |
| Mad Max Beyond Thunderdome | 1985 | Wandering by a post-apocalyptic Australia, Max Rockatansky arrives to Bartertown, a dangerous village ruled by Aunt Entity who is at war with an associate, Master Blaster, who rules Bartertown's underground where the energy that supplies the city is produced, using crude methane powered by pig feces. Violating a treaty made with Aunt Entity to kill Master Blaster, Max is left in the desert to die, where he's found by a tribe of children that live in an oasis and who mistake him as the chosen one to take them to the "Tomorrow-morrow Land". Circumstances lead Max to help them escape the oasis and Bartertown, ultimately allowing them to found a new community aimed at rebuilding civilization. | |
| Mad Max: Fury Road | 2015 | After the collapse of the civilization by economic crisis and wars, Max Rockatansky is a survivor of the subsequent holocaust who is captured by the lethal and abusive Immortan Joe's War Boys and chosen to be the "blood bag" of a War Boy named Nux. Joe's war captain Imperiator Furiosa turns on him and escapes with his wives to an attempt to free them, but is pursued by Joe and the War Boys accompanied by Max. Furiosa and Max are forced to make a deal to escape from Joe's hands and locate Green Place, where Furiosa hopes to live free with the wives. | |
| The Man Who Fell to Earth | 1976 | Based on Walter Tevis' 1963 novel of the same name, about an extraterrestrial who crash lands on Earth seeking a way to ship water to his planet, which is suffering from a severe drought. | |
| The Matrix | 1999 | A computer hacker learns from mysterious rebels about the true nature of his reality and his role in the war against its controllers. | |
| The Matrix Reloaded | 2003 | Neo, Trinity and Morpheus looking for a man named Keymaker, who is property of a powerful Matrix's program called Merovingian, to discover the origin of The Matrix and the way to win the war against the machines, while the former Agent Smith has resurrected and he lives obsessed to kill Neo again. | |
| The Matrix Revolutions | 2003 | Neo, Trinity and Morpheus try to save Zion from The Matrix, that it launched a mass invasion of machines against the underground city to annihilate all human being, while Neo must face to an out-of-control Agent Smith, who is duplicating himself in any other people in his attempt to conquer The Matrix. | |
| Max Headroom: 20 Minutes into the Future | 1985 | A television reporter trying to expose corruption and greed discovers that his employer, Network 23, has created a new form of subliminal advertising (called "blipverts") that can be fatal to certain viewers. | |
| The Maze Runner | 2014 | Thomas is deposited in a community of boys after his memory is erased, soon learning they're all trapped in a maze that will require him to join forces with fellow "Runners" for a shot at escape. Based on the first book of The Maze Runner Trilogy written by James Dashner. | |
| Maze Runner: The Scorch Trials | 2015 | 2015 American dystopian science fiction action film directed by Wes Ball and written by T. S. Nowlin, based on the novel The Scorch Trials written by James Dashner. | |
| Maze Runner: The Death Cure | 2018 | 2018 American dystopian science fiction action film directed by Wes Ball and written by T. S. Nowlin, based on the novel The Death Cure written by James Dashner. | |
| Memory of Water | 2022 | Based on the novel Memory of Water by Emmi Itäranta. In the dystopian future, a young woman from a small village lives in the Scandinavian Union led by a military government, where there is a shortage of fresh water as a result of an environmental disaster. | |
| Mercy | 2026 | In a near-future dystopian Los Angeles where crime has spiraled out of control, a detective is strapped to an execution chair and given 90 minutes to prove his innocence to a ruthless AI judge that serves as the city's sole judge, jury, and executioner. | |
| Metropia | 2009 | Animation set in a future Europe where the world is running out of oil. A gigantic underground network is created by joining all the undergrounds together beneath Europe. | |
| Metropolis | 1927 | A German expressionist epic science-fiction film directed by Fritz Lang. A man living an ideal life in a big city discovers the truth about why his city seems so ideal. | |
| Metropolis | 2001 | Animated film based on the manga by Osamu Tezuka. | |
| Millennium | 1989 | By Michael Anderson. The film follows an air crash investigator who discovers curiously strange details while investigating a recent crash. A woman is sent back to his time from the future to try and derail his investigation before he uncovers their secret. | |
| Minority Report | 2002 | Based on Philip K. Dick's short story of the same name. A police officer oversees a department that prevents crime with the help of beings who can predict it, but then he becomes a target. | |
| Mortal Engines | 2018 | In the future, the "sixty-minute war" led humanity to the brink of extinction. Digital and other modern technology was lost and now only 19th-century technology is used. Under the philosophy of Municipal Darwinism, massive engines were implanted to cities such as London to make then movable in order to hunt down any smaller settlements and consume their resources. Opponents of this way of life are stigmatized and wanted as criminals. Based on the 2001 novel by Philip Reeve. | |
| Natural City | 2003 | A colony world that integrates robots, androids and cyborgs amongst the population. | |
| Never Let Me Go | 2010 | Based on Kazuo Ishiguro's 2005 novel of the same name. | |
| Nightfall | 1988 | Based on Isaac Asimov's 1941 story of the same name. In a distant planet with three suns where its inhabitants live in a perpetual daylight, two factions of the planet led by rational scientist Aton and frantic religious Sor face each other when an incoming eclipse will cause the arrival of the night, threatening to collapse its civilization. | |
| Nineteen Eighty-Four | 1984 | Based on George Orwell's 1949 novel of the same name. | |
| Nirvana | 1997 | A successful computer game designer finds that his latest product has been infected by a virus which has given consciousness to the main character of the game. He begins a search for people who can help him to discover what happened to his fled girlfriend and to delete his game before it is released. | |
| No Blade of Grass | 1970 | The film is based on Samuel Youd's novel The Death of Grass (1956) and highlights the terrifying effects of environmental pollution. | |
| Oblivion | 2013 | Based on Joseph Kosinski's unpublished graphic novel of the same name. In 2077, Jack Harper is a future repairman that patrols a wasteland to repair failed drones from Tet (a giant space station where humanity awaits to move to Saturn's moon Titan) after Earth was invaded by alien race that sixty years ago destroyed the Moon and caused several alterations in Earth's surface. Jack finds a hibernation capsule with a woman inside it and she makes him doubt the truth of the alien invasion. | |
| The Omega Man | 1971 | The second of three adaptations of Richard Matheson's 1954 novel I Am Legend. In a world collapsed after a worldwide disease, Robert Neville is a scientist immune to the plague in permanent searching for a cure for the infected, turned in a religious cult of albino mutants named The Family and led by demented Matthias, who is obsessed to destroy Neville and all trace of technology he believes blame of the world downfall. | |
| On the Beach | 1959 | Based on Nevil Shute's 1957 novel of the same name depicting the aftermath of a nuclear war. | |
| On the Beach | 2000 | Based on Nevil Shute's 1957 novel of the same name depicting the aftermath of a nuclear war, TV re-make of the 1959 version. | |
| Outland | 1981 | Set on Jupiter's moon Io, it has been described as a space Western, and bears thematic resemblances to the classic 1952 film High Noon. | |
| Paranoia 1.0 (originally One Point O) | 2004 | The film is a Kafkaesque nightmare in which a young computer programmer is an unwitting guinea pig in a corporate experiment to test a new advertising scheme. | |
| The Plague | 1992 | Based on Albert Camus' novel of the same name, a seaside city is overrun by plague. The tireless Dr. Bernard Rieux (William Hurt) must contend with not only the epidemic and the ensuing panic - but with official policy which swings sharply from denial at first, to draconian quarantine later on. | |
| Planet of the Apes (original series) | 1968—1973 | Most of humanity is extinguished in a thermonuclear war. In the course of the two following millennia, intelligent apes (chimpanzees, gorillas and orangutans) become the dominant species and establish an organized society. During the 40th century, an ultra-powerful nuclear bomb is launched as a last resort in a conflict between mutant humans and gorillas, ultimately destroying the entire planet. | |
| Planet of the Apes (reboot series) | 2011—present | A colony of apes in a sanctuary is affected by a viral gas which enhances their intelligence. As a result, they flee the sanctuary and form an organized society apart from humans. Ten years later, that same virus causes a massive pandemic disease called the Simian flu, which ultimately wipes out all humans with the exception of those genetically immune to the virus. A group of immune human survivors form a colony and eventually engage in a war with the apes. | |
| Pleasantville | 1998 | A brother and sister get zapped into an idealistic TV show from the 1950s, but they realize that it's a sexually repressed society. | |
| The Postman | 1997 | After an unspecified "Doomwar", society has collapsed and technology is stagnant. People live in small communities, terrorized by a militia. Wearing an old postman's uniform he found on a corpse, a wanderer tells townspeople that the postal service and centralized government have been restored. The lie gives the people hope to stand up to the militia. | |
| Priest | 2011 | Centuries later of a post-apocalyptic war between vampires and humans that isolated the planet, Priest is a warrior in a theocratic future led by The Church who abandons the city to enter in the outer wastelands after his brother and sister-in-law are killed and his niece is kidnapped, discovering that the vampires still alive. | |
| Le prix du danger | 1983 | French movie very similar to The Running Man, made four years earlier. | |
| Punishment Park | 1971 | A pseudo documentary of a British and West German film crew following National Guard soldiers and police as they pursue members of a counterculture group across a desert. | |
| The Purge | 2013 | In a futuristic world where America is plagued by crime, the government sanctions a 12-hour period once a year in which all criminal activity is legal. The Sandin family is in danger after their younger son Charlie saves a stranger, only to be killed just before he got close to the house, causing the killers to surround it to get into the home and kill everybody. | |
| The Purge: Anarchy | 2014 | During the 12-hour period once a year in which all criminal activity is legal, LAPD Sargeant Leo Barnes is looking for revenge after the death of his son, at the same time that the married couple formed by Shane and Liz are trapped in the streets to be killed by urban biker gangs and that a man named Carmelo Johns leads a revolution against The Purge. | |
| The Purge: Election Year | 2016 | Senator Charlie Roan and her head of security must survive an annual night of terror where all crime is legal. | |
| Quarantine | 2021 | Felix has not left his dwelling for more than 20 years, since the whole world was placed under forced quarantine. After the quarantine was announced, a global catastrophe happened. Felix was one of the few who managed to hide underground in a bunker, and survive. His only companions are the ghosts of the people he once knew. Felix is stuck with a guilty conscience and is haunted by the idea that he could have somehow stopped the disaster. | |
| Quintet (film) | 1979 | A post apocalyptic film starring Paul Newman where 6 people play a deadly game in a dystopian future. | |
| Radio Free Albemuth | 2010 | The film based on Philip K. Dick's novel of the same name (posthumously published in 1985) is set in an alternate reality America circa 1985 under authoritarian control. In it a record store clerk receives hallucinatory missives from the alien satellite VALIS. | |
| Ready Player One | 2018 | In the year 2045, much of Earth's population centers have become slum-like cities due to overpopulation, pollution, corruption, and climate change. To escape their desolation, people engage in the virtual reality world of the OASIS (Ontologically Anthropocentric Sensory Immersive Simulation), where they can engage in numerous activities for work, education, and entertainment. Wade Owen Watts is a teenager from Columbus, OH who frequents the OASIS and attempts to win "Anorak's Game", a game created by the recently deceased creator of the OASIS, James Halliday, in search of its easter egg. The winner is to be granted full ownership of the OASIS and Halliday's $240 billion fortune. While Wade works with several friends from the OASIS to discover Anorak's treasure, the corporate giant Innovative Online Industries (IOI) employs a number of players to try to discover the treasure first and seize control of OASIS for themselves. | |
| Renaissance | 2006 | Also known as Paris 2054: Renaissance, is a 2006 animation which concerns a French policeman investigating the kidnapping of a scientist who may hold the key to eternal life in a futuristic and slightly dystopian Paris. | |
| Repo! The Genetic Opera | 2008 | This rock opera musical horror film takes place in the year 2056 where an epidemic of organ failures has devastated the planet. The mega-corporation GeneCo provides organ transplants on a payment plan. Clients who default on payments are hunted down by Repo Men: skilled assassins contracted by GeneCo to repossess organs, usually killing the clients in the process. | |
| Repo Men | 2010 | Based on Eric Garcia's novel The Repossession Mambo. | |
| Resident Evil series | 2002—2016 | Science fiction horror franchise written and directed by Paul W. S. Anderson, based on the video game of the same name. | |
| Rise of the Planet of the Apes | 2011 | Caesar (Andy Serkis) is a chimpanzee who gains human-like intelligence and emotions from an experimental drug. Raised like a child by the drug's creator, Will Rodman (James Franco) and a primatologist Caroline Aranha (Freida Pinto), Caesar ultimately finds himself taken from the humans he loves and imprisoned in an ape sanctuary in San Bruno. Seeking justice for his fellow inmates, Caesar gives the fellow apes the same drug that he inherited. He then assembles a simian army and escapes the sanctuary. | |
| The Road | 2009 | Based on the Pulitzer Prize-winning 2006 novel of the same name by Cormac McCarthy. A man and his young son struggle to survive after a global cataclysm has caused an extinction event. They scavenge for supplies and avoid roaming gangs as they travel on a road to the coast in the hope it will be warmer. | |
| RoboCop | 1987 | In 2043, Detroit is a city besieged by crime. Police officer Alex Murphy is killed by a criminals secretly supported by OCP's CEO Dick Jones, to increase delinquence in the city in order to approve a new police robot, ED-209. But the younger CEO Bob Morton chooses Murphy for a special project to revive as a superhuman cyborg law enforcer, Robocop. | |
| RoboCop | 2014 | Remake of the 1987 film of the same name. In a 2028 where there are police robots in entire world but the United States, Alex Murphy is a police officer killed in the line of duty. The company Omnicorp, trying to validate a law to approve the use of police robots in the country (with it as prime supplier), saves Murphy's brain and face to fuse with a robotic body, creating a cyborg named Robocop. | |
| Rollerball | 1975 | A future society uses an ultra-violent game as entertainment, with the condition that no one player turns for the public more important than the game. | |
| The Rover | 2014 | The contemporary western takes place in the Australian outback, ten years after a global economic collapse. | |
| The Running Man | 1987 | Loosely adapted from Stephen King's 1982 novel of the same name. After an economic collapse that ruined the world, the U.S. government and a TV channel join forces to create the game show "The Running Man," where criminals are sent to their deaths at the hands of "gladiators" working for the network. Ben Richards (Arnold Schwarzenegger), a former police officer, was convicted for rejecting an order to shoot unarmed civilians during a riot. He is forced to participate in the show with a woman named Amber Méndez after she discovered that TV news routinely falsifies events to keep the public deceived. | |
| The Running Man | 2025 | In a dystopian near-future, a desperate father enters a deadly reality game show to win money for his sick daughter, becoming an unexpected sensation as he is hunted by assassins for the entertainment of a bloodthirsty nation. | |
| Russian Symphony | 1994 | A man is desperate to do something good with his life before it ends, but is mostly met with suspicion in a dark version of contemporary Russia where the world seems to be coming to an end through a flood. | |
| A Scanner Darkly | 2006 | Adapted from Philip K. Dick's 1977 novel of the same name. A dangerous new drug causes the users to begin to lose their own identity. | |
| Scanners | 1981 | Set in an alternate near-future in which a pregnancy sedative called ephemerol has caused children called "Scanners" to be born with uncontrollable psychic abilities. The private military company ConSec tries to recruit and weaponize them to stop a malevolent ring led by a Scanner seeking to distributing ephemerol to create a new generation of Scanners to conquer the world. | |
| Seconds | 1966 | Based on a novel by David Ely of the same name, Seconds is a mystery dealing with the obsession with eternal youth and a mysterious organization which gives people a second chance in life. | |
| Serenity | 2005 | A continuation of Joss Whedon's short-lived 2002 Fox television series Firefly. Starring the same cast, it takes place after the events of the final episode. | |
| Sexmission | 1984 | Polish cult classic about two male volunteers who wake up from a botched hibernation experiment to discover they are living in a matriarchy. The men discover that men are blamed for all the evils in the past and have since become extinct, and written out of history. Sexual desire is removed through medication and women reproduce via parthenogenesis with all offspring being female. | |
| Silent Running | 1972 | In the future, Earth has eliminated all disease by paving over the natural world. An astronaut who keeps some forests inside giant space greenhouses hoping to restore Earth's environment receives the order to burn them after the project is abandoned, tracing a secret plan to preserve them before his job partners can stop him. | |
| Sleep Dealer | 2008 | A fortified wall has ended unauthorized Mexico-US immigration, but migrant workers are replaced by robots, remotely controlled by the same class of would-be emigrants. Their life force is inevitably used up, and they are discarded without medical compensation. | |
| Sleeper | 1973 | Awakened 200 years after an experiment gone bad, a nebbish finds it hard to survive in the weird future. | |
| Snowpiercer | 2013 | A plan to reverse global warming inadvertently freezes the entire planet. The survivors now live in an unstoppable train that time and time again traverses the globe, but separated in different wagons according to their social status, motivating that a worker-class man from the last wagons leads a riot to arrive the first wagons where are the upper-class. | |
| Solarbabies | 1986 | After a worldwide nuclear war, the world is ruled by Eco Protectorate, a fascist and paramilitary organization that keeps all the remaining water of the planet imprisoned after the evaporation of a large part of the oceans. Solarbabies, a team of teen rollers raised in one of the Protectorate's orphanages (where all children and teens are trained to serve the system), must save Protectorate from an alien shining ball named Bodhi sent to planet Earth to free the water. | |
| South of 8 | 2016 | In a near future, crime and unemployment is at record highs when a youth group of bank robbers knock off banks as society enters the next Great Depression in the United States. | |
| Southland Tales | 2007 | Set in the then-near future of 2008, as part of an alternate history, the film is a portrait of Los Angeles, and a satiric commentary on the military–industrial complex and the infotainment industry. | |
| Soylent Green | 1973 | Based on Harry Harrison's novel Make Room! Make Room! (1966). It centers around the issue of overpopulation. | |
| Stalker | 1979 | Based on the Arkady and Boris Strugatsky 1972 novel Roadside Picnic. A guide - Stalker — leads his clients through a dangerous and unusual area titled the Zone. The Zone contains a mystical place called the Room, where wishes are granted to anyone who dares step inside. Stalker takes on two clients, a writer and scientist, to take with him to the Zone. However the trio ends up on a more difficult quest than they initially bargained for. | |
| The Stand | 1994 | Based on Stephen King's 1978 novel of the same name. A mega-virus wipes out most of humanity, and the few people who are immune congregate to try and form a new society. | |
| Steel Dawn | 1987 | In a post-World War III world, an unnamed warrior nicknamed "Nomad", arrives at the town of Meridian looking to avenge his mentor's murder. Joining Kasha, her child Jux, and Kasha's foreman Tarka to protect the town from a local landowner named Damnil, who is convinced that Meridian's citizens are capable of producing pure water, the most valuable substance in a desert world. | |
| Strange Days | 1995 | Set in the last two days of 1999 in a dystopian and crime-ridden Los Angeles, it follows a black marketeer of SQUID disks (which allows its users to relive the memories of a person and experience their physical sensations) who attempts to solve the murder of a prostitute. | |
| Surrogates | 2009 | Based on the 2005–2006 comic book series The Surrogates, the movie follows an FBI agent who ventures out into the real world to investigate the murder of surrogates (humanoid remote controlled robots). | |
| Tank Girl | 1995 | Based on the British comic series of the same name, a tank-riding, anti-heroine fights a mega-corporation which controls the world's water supply. | |
| Tekken | 2010 | Based on the fighting game series (started in 1994) of the same name. The film follows a man in his attempts to enter the Iron Fist Tournament in order to avenge the loss of his mother by confronting his father and grandfather, the latter of whom he believes to be responsible for his mother's death. | |
| The 10th Victim | 1965 | In the near-future, wars are avoided by giving people a chance to kill in the ¨Big Hunt¨; the most popular form of entertainment. Based on Robert Sheckley's short story, Seventh Victim (1953). | |
| The Terminator | 1984 | A waitress named Sarah Connor is saved from the Terminator T-800, a time-traveling android assassin, by Kyle Reese. He reveals to her that in the future the computer system Skynet will cause a nuclear war in order to allow machines to take over the world, and reveals that she will be the mother of the future resistance leader against the machines. | |
| Terminator 2: Judgment Day | 1991 | John Connor is a teenager who learns his true fate as future leader of the resistance against Skynet, when a reprogrammed T-800 is sent back in time to save him from the T-1000, a liquid metal model Terminator, sent back in time to kill him. | |
| Terminator 3: Rise of the Machines | 2003 | An adult John Connor lives as a transient worker, when he meets by chance a former friend, vet Kate Brewster. When a second T-800 is sent back in time to protect them from T-X, a new model of Terminator sent to kill not only John Connor, but all of Connor's deputies in the war against Skynet. | |
| Terminator Salvation | 2009 | In a world consumed by a nuclear holocaust, an adult John Connor (who leads the war against machines) is looking for a young Kyle Reese among the Terminators' prisoners so that someday Reese can travel back in time and meet his mother, Sarah Connor. | |
| They Live | 1988 | Adapted from Ray Nelson's play Eight O'Clock in the Morning. A man who finds a pair of sunglasses that shows the world as it really is, discovers that an alien race live disguised as human beings, putting subliminal messages in all kind of books and advertising posters to submit the human race. | |
| Things to Come | 1936 | It is 30–40 years in the future, in the 1960s and 70s, and society has broken down after years of war. A contagious disease spreads throughout the globe. Brutal warlords rule with an iron fist. Technology stagnates. But a brotherhood of engineers and mechanics works to restore civilization. | |
| The Thinning | 2016 | Set in a dystopian future in which population control is enforced through a school aptitude test. Those who fail it are executed. Two high school students learn, to their horror, that the tests are rigged. They face many challenges and eventually make the ultimate sacrifice. | |
| Threads | 1984 | Controversial docudrama detailing the likely outcome of a nuclear war, set in Sheffield, England. After a lengthy international conflict involving Russia, a young, pregnant woman survives a nuclear war which kills millions, renders most technology useless and drastically effects the Earth's climate. The film graphically depicts the effects of nuclear winter and fallout over a thirteen-year period, during which there is a major and consistent deterioration of Britain's society, agriculture, sanitation and education. | |
| The Time Machine | 1960 | Film adoption of H. G. Wells' novel The Time Machine (1895). Looking to test his time travel device, a scientist travels by mistake to 802701 AD to find a neo-primitive world divided between two races: the pacifistic but totally insensitive Eloi, and the brutal and savage Morlocks, degenerate mutants who live in caves, raising Eloi as livestock for food. | |
| The Time Machine | 2002 | Remake of the 1960 movie. Alexander Hartdegen (Guy Pearce) is a scientist and an inventor, who is determined to prove that time travel is possible. When the girl he loves, Emma (Sienna Guillory), is tragically killed, Alexander is determined to go back in time and change the path. Testing his theories, the time machine is hurtled 800,000 years into the future. He discovers a terrifying new world. Instead of mankind being the hunter, they are now the hunted, with him stuck in the middle. | |
| THX 1138 | 1971 | The first film by director George Lucas. In the future, mankind lives in vast underground cities and free will is outlawed by means of mandatory medication that controls human emotion. But when THX 1138 (Robert Duvall) and LUH 3417 (Maggie McOmie) stop taking their meds, they wake up to the bleak reality of their own existence and fall in love with each other in the process. But love is also illegal in this Orwellian dystopia, and the act of making love has made both of them outlaws on the run from an army of robotic police. | |
| Total Recall | 1990 | Loosely based on Philip K. Dick's short story "We Can Remember It for You Wholesale" (1966). Douglas Quaid is a bored construction worker in the year 2084 who dreams of visiting the colonized Mars. He visits "Rekall," a company that plants false memories into people's brains, in order to experience the thrill of Mars without having to travel there. But something goes wrong during the procedure; Quaid discovers that his entire life is actually a false memory and that the people who implanted it in his head now want him dead. | |
| Total Recall | 2012 | Remake of the 1990 film of the same name. In need of a vacation from his ordinary life, factory worker Douglas Quaid (Colin Farrell) visits Rekall, a company that can turn dreams into real memories. Thinking that memories of life as a superspy are just the ticket, Quaid undergoes the procedure—but it goes horribly wrong. Suddenly, Quaid is a hunted man. He teams up with a rebel fighter (Jessica Biel) on a search to find the head of the underground resistance and take down the leader (Bryan Cranston) of the free world. | |
| Transcendence | 2014 | Dr. Will Caster (Johnny Depp), the world's foremost authority on artificial intelligence, is conducting highly controversial experiments to create a sentient machine. When extremists try to kill the doctor, they inadvertently become the catalyst for him to succeed. Will's wife, Evelyn (Rebecca Hall), and best friend, Max (Paul Bettany), can only watch as his thirst for knowledge evolves to an omnipresent quest for power, and his loved ones soon realize that it may be impossible to stop him. | |
| The Trial | 1962 | Based on Franz Kafka's novel of the same name, which was published in 1925. A man gets put on trial but cannot obtain any information about the charge. | |
| Turkey Shoot | 1982 | In a dystopian future where deviants are held in "re-education" camps, a freedom fighter and an innocent prisoner try to survive their oppressors' game of kill-or-be-killed. | |
| Uglies | 2024 | Based on the novel of the same name by Scott Westerfeld. In the future, the world has fallen into chaos after exhausting all natural resources. To keep humanity alive, scientists first create genetically modified orchids that are a new energy source, and second, a surgical procedure to enhance human beings in both appearance and fitness to prevent prejudice and discrimination. The surgery is performed on "Uglies" when they are sixteen before allowing them to go to the city, where celebrations occur among the "Pretties". | |
| The Ugly Swans | 2006 | Based on the 1967 novel of the same name by Arkady and Boris Strugatsky. In the near future, writer Victor Banev gets himself on a UN commission to investigate what's going on in the flooded city of Tashlinsk where the rain never stops. Reports tell of a virus-created race of brainiac mutants. He is seeking his daughter in his former homeland. Banev's young daughter Ira is enrolled at a school for gifted children which has been taken over by the mutants, "mokretsy", who have grown to despise ordinary humanity. | |
| V for Vendetta | 2006 | Based on Alan Moore's graphic novel of the same name. Following a worldwide pandemic and collapse of the United States into civil war, England is a police state ruled by the fascist Norsefire Party, and a vigilante known only as V (Hugo Weaving) uses terrorist tactics to fight the oppressors of the world in which he now lives. When V saves a young woman named Evey (Natalie Portman) from the secret police, he discovers an ally in his fight against England's oppressors. | |
| Videodrome | 1983 | Set in Toronto during the early 1980s, it follows the CEO of a small UHF television station who stumbles upon a broadcast signal featuring extreme violence and torture. | |
| A Visitor to a Museum | 1989 | In a post-apocalyptic world, in which a large part of the population consists of demented and deformed mutants, a man who is one of the few survivors who has managed to retain the human form and way of thinking, embarks upon visiting the ruins of a museum buried under the sea which can only be accessed during low tide. | |
| WALL-E | 2008 | Centuries in the future, Earth had become toxic due to the extreme amounts of waste produced by a megacorporation, which also endorsed consumerism and technological dependency. | |
| Watchmen | 2009 | Based on the 1986–87 DC Comics limited series of the same name by Alan Moore and Dave Gibbons, the film is set in an alternate history in the year 1985. In this timeline, the presence of American superheroes has changed human history; Vietnam has become America's 51st state, the Watergate scandal was never revealed, President Richard Nixon was elected to four terms, and a near-omnipotent superhuman codenamed Doctor Manhattan acts as a living nuclear deterrent. However, nuclear war with the Soviet Union seems inevitable. A group of retired superheroes investigate the murder of one of their colleagues. | |
| Waterworld | 1995 | Massive ice caps have melted, and most of Earth's land became submerged. The few surviving humans, who live in big ships and artificial atolls, are poor and ignorant since they have lost most of their resources, as well as their technological and historical knowledge. | |
| Westworld | 1973 | Written and directed by Michael Crichton. A theme park focusing on the Old West goes haywire when the robots turn against the humans. | |
| What Happened to Monday | 2017 | Circa 2043, overpopulation has led to a strict one-child policy where all but a mother's eldest child are put into cryosleep. | |
| Wild in the Streets | 1968 | When the voting age is lowered to 14, teenagers take over the US government and everyone over 35 is confined in concentration camps and forced to take LSD. | |
| The World, the Flesh and the Devil | 1959 | American science-fiction doomsday film set in a post-apocalyptic world with very few human survivors. It is based on two sources: the 1901 novel The Purple Cloud by M. P. Shiel, and the story "End of the World" by Ferdinand Reyher. The film stars Harry Belafonte, who was then at the peak of his film career; directed by Ranald MacDougall. | |
| World on a Wire | 1973 | German television movie (original title Welt am Draht), directed by Rainer Werner Fassbinder. | |
| X-Men: Days of Future Past | 2014 | The plot toggles between the political tumult of 1973 and a not-so-distant dystopian future. | |
| Z for Zachariah | 2015 | Based on the book of the same name by Robert C. O'Brien published posthumously in 1974. In the wake of a disaster that wipes out most of civilization, two men and a young woman find themselves in an emotionally charged love triangle as the last known survivors. | |
| Z.P.G. | 1972 | Z.P.G. (short for "Zero Population Growth") is inspired by the non-fiction best-selling book The Population Bomb by Paul R. Ehrlich. The film concerns an overpopulated future Earth, whose world government executes those who violate a 30-year ban on having children. | |
| Zafari | 2024 | Set in a decaying society, food has run out, forcing humans to seek alternative ways to obtain it, while the hippos, especially one named Zafari, have no shortage of food. | |
| Zardoz | 1974 | The post-apocalypse population is divided into the immortal, technologically advanced but depressive "Eternals" and mortal, food-supplying, often exterminated "Brutals". | |
| The Zero Theorem | 2013 | Centers on a reclusive computer genius working on a formula to determine whether life holds any meaning. | |

== See also ==
- List of dystopian literature
- List of dystopian comics
- List of biopunk and cyberpunk works
- Apocalyptic and post-apocalyptic fiction
