= Escape from Hell! =

2008 novel by Hal Duncan

- Escape from Hell! first edition cover.
- Author: Hal Duncan
- Language: English
- Genre: Speculative fiction, comedy, adventure
- Publisher: MonkeyBrain Books
- Publication date: 2008
- Publication place: United Kingdom
- Media type: Print
- Pages: 128
- ISBN: 978-1-932265-25-5

Escape from Hell! is a speculative fiction novella by Scottish writer Hal Duncan, strongly inspired by the movies Jacob's Ladder and Escape from New York but also by the works of William Blake and John Milton.

It was first published in the United States by MonkeyBrain Books in 2008.

== Introduction ==
The prologue of the book introduces the reader to four characters, who in it meet their death in different ways. Eli (a clear reference to the biblical prophet of the same name) is a beggar sometimes defined a hobo, who commits suicide; Seven (probably referring to the seven deadly sins or to the David Fincher film Seven) is a hitman who ends up killed by his paymaster; Matthew (clearly Matthew Shepard, already referred to by the author in his previous novels Vellum and Ink) is a young homosexual man who was beaten to death; Belle is a prostitute and a drug addict who is killed by her pimp for having tried to leave "the profession".

The four characters see each other (but do not interact) on the ferry that takes them across the Styx and into Hell.

After having been walked through gates bearing the Dante Alighieri words "Abandon Hope", gates that are described as very similar to those of Auschwitz concentration camp, they are assigned to four different sections. Eli is let loose in the streets of a dystopian version of Manhattan, where he struggles to hide from police-like vigilantes; Seven is locked in a structure resembling a prison where he is constantly tortured; Belle is kept in a room where she is regularly raped; Matthew is in an institution similar to a psychiatric hospital where doctors try to "cure" him from his homosexual tendencies.

In different ways, they all manage to escape from their situation and join forces; they rescue Lucifer from Gabriel the archangel, who is running Hell in his stead, and try to get him back into Heaven too.

== Conception ==
Hal Duncan admitted in an interview that the idea for this book came to him while drunk, and that initially he had written it as the script for a possible gonzo-style movie.

== Reception ==
Escape from Hell! has been praised for his mix of adventure and irony.

== Sequels ==
Hal Duncan announced that he is working on two sequels to this novel, Assault! On Heaven! and Battle! For the Planet! Of the Dead!.
