= Vellum (disambiguation) =

Vellum is skin prepared for writing or printing on, to produce single pages, scrolls, codices or books.

Vellum may also refer to:

- Vellum, a piece of computer software released in 1989 (now re-branded as Graphite)
- Vellum: The Book of All Hours, a 2006 novel by Hal Duncan
