= Memory of water =

Memory of water may refer to:

- Memory of Water (1994 film), (Spanish: La memoria del agua), a Spanish-Argentine drama film directed by Héctor Fáver
- Memory of Water, a novel by Finnish author Emmi Itäranta
  - Memory of Water (2022 film), a film adaptation based on the novel
- The Memory of Water, a comedy by English playwright Shelagh Stephenson
- The Memory of Water (film), a 2015 Chilean drama film written and directed by Matías Bize
- Water memory, a refuted theory behind homeopathic remedies
