= Lists of dystopian works =

The following are lists of dystopian works:

- List of dystopian comics
- List of dystopian films
- List of dystopian literature
- List of dystopian TV programs
- List of dystopian music
