= Aysha Kala =

British actor and theatre maker

- Education: Royal Welsh College of Music & Drama
- Occupations: Actor, theatre maker
- Years active: 2011–present

Aysha Kala is a British actress and theatre maker. On television, she is known for her roles in the Channel 4 series Shameless (2011) and Indian Summers (2015–2016), and the BBC One series Virdee (2025) and The Split Up (2026). She was named a 2015 BAFTA Breakthrough Brit.

== Early life and education ==
Aysha Kala grew up in Snaresbrook in east London, England. Her father is a Gujarati Muslim from Gujarat, India.

Kala attended Chigwell School. She graduated from the Royal Welsh College of Music & Drama in 2013.

== Career ==
Kala made her television debut in 2011 when she joined the cast of Shameless on Channel 4 for its eighth series as Sita Desai. Her professional stage debut came in 2012 with roles in the Royal Shakespeare Company production of Much Ado About Nothing in Stratford-upon-Avon, that she was nominated for an Ian Charleson Award, and Khadija is 18 at the Finborough Theatre, nominated for the 2012 Offie for Female Performance.

Upon graduating from drama school in 2013, Kala made her feature film debut in the comedy Jadoo. She also appeared in Farragut North at Southwark Playhouse and Djinns Of Eidgah at the Royal Court Theatre.

She was named a 2015 BAFTA Breakthrough Brit.

In 2015 and 2016, Kala had a main role as Sooni Dalal in the Channel 4 drama Indian Summers.

In the years following, Kala did more theatre, including PunkPlay at Southwark Playhouse in 2016, Obsession at the Barbican Theatre in 2017, Vanya and Sonia and Masha and Spike at the Theatre Royal, Bath in 2019, and The Welkin at the National Theatre in 2020.

Kala returned to television in 2021 with guest appearances in the BBC series Call the Midwife and the Netflix series Master of None. This was followed in 2022 by recurring roles in Man vs. Bee, also on Netflix, and the Channel 4 thriller The Undeclared War.

Kala returned to the National Theatre in 2023 when she originated the role of Jessica Levy in The Motive and the Cue, directed by Sam Mendes, and took over the role of Vimala in The Father and the Assassin.

She had roles in the Paramount+ series The Doll Factory (2023) and the Apple TV+ series Criminal Record(2024).

She plays Saima, the wife of detective Virdee, in the BBC One crime drama Virdee, which premiered in February 2025. At time of the series release, she was filming season 2 of Criminal Record.

== Filmography ==
=== Film ===
Year	Title	Role	Notes
2013	Jadoo	Seema Chandana	8 episodes (series 8)
2014	Second Coming	Waitress	
2015	Exmas	Ice Queen	Short film
2019	Osama Bin Hiding	Myra	Short film
2019	Home Girl	Roya	Short film
2019	The Deranged Marriage	Sona	Short film

=== Television ===
Year	Title	Role	Notes
2011	Shameless	Sita Desai	8 episodes (series 8)
2013	Vicious	Emma	Episode: "Clubbing"
2015–2016	Indian Summers	Sooni Dalal	Main role
2021	Call the Midwife	Sarita Gupta	1 episode
2021	Master of None	Reshmi	Episode: "Moments in Love, Chapter 1"
2022	Man vs. Bee	Detective	2 episodes
2022	The Undeclared War	Amina	3 episodes
2023	The Doll Factory	Ananya	3 episodes
2024	Criminal Record	Sonya Singh	8 episodes
2025	Virdee	Saima Virdee	6 episodes
2026	The Split Up	Maya Kishan	6 episodes

== Stage ==
Year	Title	Role	Notes
2012	Much Ado About Nothing	Maid	Courtyard Theatre, Stratford-upon-Avon
2012	Khadija is 18	Khadija	Finborough Theatre, London
2013	Farragut North	Molly	Southwark Playhouse, London
2013	Djinns Of Eidgah	Ashrafi	Royal Court Theatre, London
2016	PunkPlay	Various	Southwark Playhouse, London
2017	Obsession	Anita	Barbican Theatre, London
2018	Frogman	Fiona	Shoreditch Town Hall, London
2018	An Adventure	Sonal / Joy	Bush Theatre, London
2019	Vanya and Sonia and Masha and Spike	Nina	Theatre Royal, Bath
2020	The Welkin	Peg Carter	National Theatre, London
2021	Under the Mask		Rose Theatre, Kingston
2022	Scandaltown	Hannah	Lyric Theatre, Hammersmith
2023	The Motive and the Cue	Jessica Levy	National Theatre, London
2023	The Father and the Assassin	Vimala	National Theatre, London
2026	Teeth 'n' Smiles	Laura	Duke of York's Theatre, London

== Audio ==
Year	Title	Role	Notes
2015	Earthsea	Tenar	BBC Radio 4
2015	The City of Woven Streets	Narrator	Novel by Emmi Itäranta
2016	Radio Silence	Narrator	Novel by Alice Oseman
2018	I Was Born for This	Narrator	Novel by Alice Oseman

== Awards and nominations ==
Year	Award	Category	Work	Result	Ref.
2012	Offies	Plays: Female Performance	Khadija is 18	Nominated	
2013	Ian Charleson Awards		Much Ado About Nothing	Nominated	
