= Papaveria Press =

Independent British publisher

- Founded: 2001
- Founder: Erzebet YellowBoy Carr
- Country of origin: US
- Headquarters location: Wakefield, West Yorkshire, United Kingdom
- Publication types: Books, e-books, handbound books
- Fiction genres: Fantastic, esoteric, poetry
- Official website: www.papaveria.com

Papaveria Press is an independent British publishing house based in Wakefield, West Yorkshire. It specializes in special, limited handbound editions and paperbacks in the fields of fairy tale, myth and poetry.

== History ==
Papaveria Press was founded by American writer and artist Erzebet YellowBoy Carr in Philadelphia (Pennsylvania, US) in 2001 before transferring to Wakefield (West Yorkshire, United Kingdom).

Papaveria Press publishes handbound, non-ISBN limited editions of original and not short stories and poems and paperbacks, also in electronic format. Papaveria's catalogue also mentions some one-off releases made on order.

Founder and owner Erzebet YellowBoy Carr personally binds all the special editions released by Papaveria, with the aim to make each book a work of art not only for its contents but also in its appearance. She defines books as "small gods".

Papaveria donated all the proceeds from their sales to Doctors Without Borders in the wake of the 2011 Japan earthquake and tsunami.

Between 2010 and 2011 it became an imprint of Circle Six alongside Hadean Press (also founded by Erzebet YellowBoy Carr alongside her husband Dis) and the newly founded Alchemy Press in order to make the handling of the financial side smoother.

== Titles ==
- Perennial Love by Aria Nadii (paintings) & C.P. McDill (text) (handbound, limited edition of 20 copies)
- Vertebrate Dreams by Erzebet YellowBoy (handbound, limited edition of 9 copies)
- The Frog Wife by Catherynne M. Valente (one-off)
- The Room by Veronica Schanoes (handbound, limited edition of 12 copies)
- Ghosts of Gunkanjima by Catherynne M. Valente (handbound, limited edition of 24 copies)
- The Descent of Inanna by Catherynne M. Valente (handbound, limited edition of 50 copies)
- Genesis by Joel Fried (handbound, limited edition of 22 copies)
- Sonnets for Orpheus by Hal Duncan (handbound, limited edition of 26 copies)
- The Quest of the Queen's Tears by Lord Dunsany (handbound, limited edition of 6 copies)
- Village of One Thousand Cranes by Danny Adams (handbound, limited edition of 33 copies)
- Godfather Death by JoSelle Vanderhooft (illustrations by Marge Simon) (handbound, limited edition of 13 copies)
- The Time Traveler's Son by Jason Erik Lundberg (handbound, limited edition of 12 copies)
- Postscripts from the Red Sea by Sonya Taaffe (handbound, limited edition of 12 copies)
- Loving the Dead (Excerpts from a Necromancer's Memory) by Erzebet YellowBoy (handbound, limited edition of 13 copies one of which was burned)
- The Sophia Leaves Text Messages by Sara Amis (handbound, limited edition of 18 copies)
- Berry Moon, Bound by Camilla Bruce (one-off)
- The Glamour Down Two Path Roads by Berrien C. Henderson (handbound, limited edition of 18 copies)
- Chanteys for the Fisherangels by Lal Waterson, J.C. Runolfson, Sonia Taaffe, Francesca Forrest, Erik Amundsen (handbound, limited edition of 33 copies)
- Jabberwocky by Lewis Carroll (one-off)
- The Honey Month by Amal El-Mohtar (paperback, ISBN 978-1-907881-00-8; contains the Rhysling Award-winning poem "Peach-Creamed Honey")
- The Lucifer Cantos by Hal Duncan (handbound, limited edition of 26 copies)
- Two Coins by Alex Dally MacFarlane (handbound, limited edition of 18 copies)
- The Winter Triptych by Nicole Kohrner-Stace (paperback, ISBN 978-1-907881-02-2; royalties partially donated to Doctors Without Borders)
- Jack o' the Hills by C.S.E. Cooney (paperback, ISBN 978-1-907881-03-9)
- Stone Telling edited by Rose Lemberg (one-off)
- Songs for the Devil and Death by Hal Duncan (paperback, ISBN 978-1-907881-04-6)
- Shiny Thing by Patricia Russo (paperback, announced)
