= Anne Leinonen =

Finnish writer

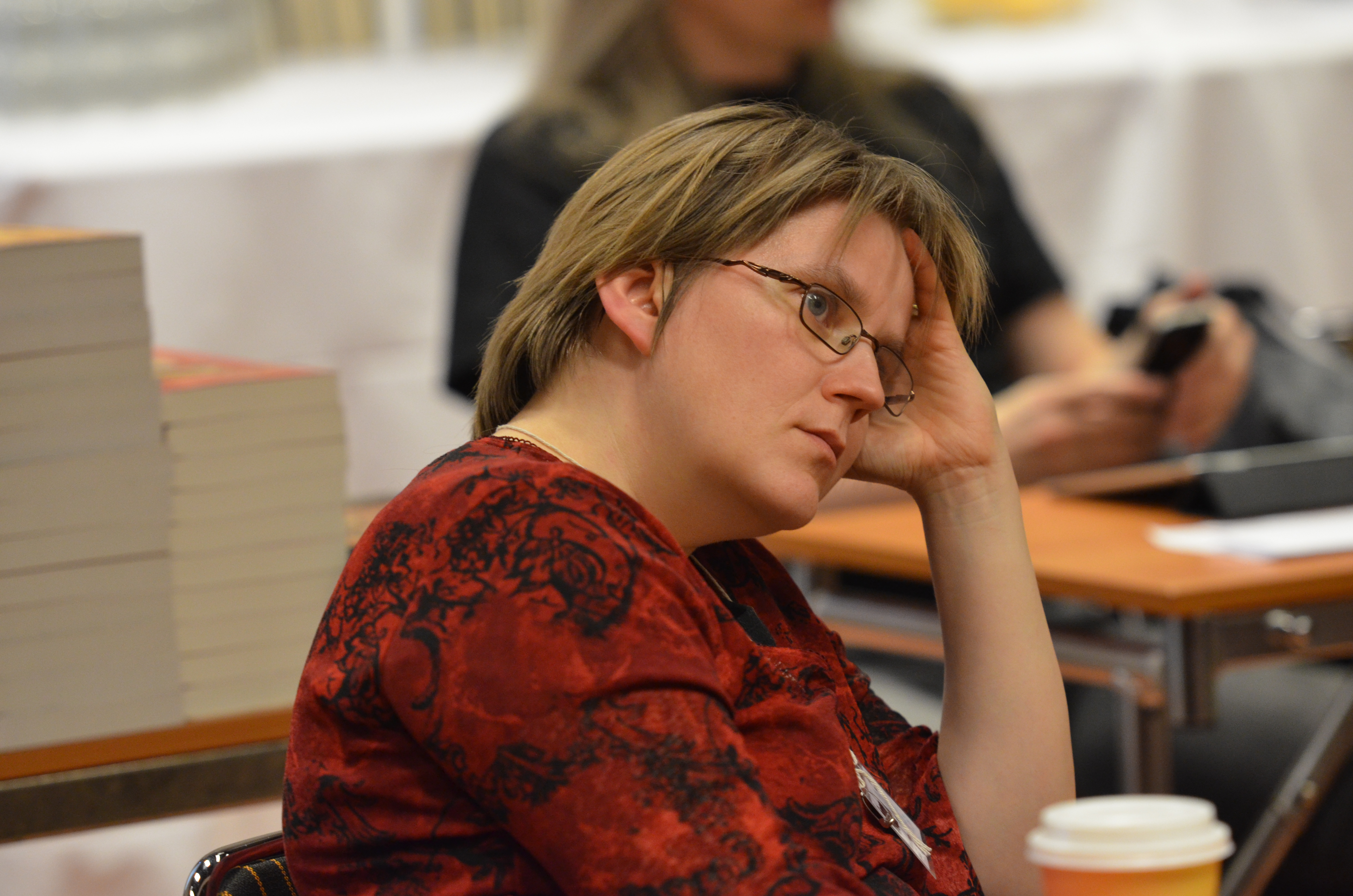
- Born: 1973 (age 52–53); Juva, Finland
- Education: Helsinki University
- Occupation: Writer

Anne Leinonen (born 1973 in Juva) is a Finnish science fiction and fantasy writer who has received the Atorox Award and was a co-nominee for the 2012 Tähtivaeltaja Award.

Anne Leinonen studied geography at Helsinki University. She has written short stories and novels for young adults. Many of her works are co-authored with Eija Lappalainen. Leinonen has graduated with a Master of Philosophy from the University of Helsinki, majoring in geography. Leinonen works as a publisher and educational material producer in Mikkeli.
