= Risto Isomäki =

Finnish author of science fiction books (born 1961)

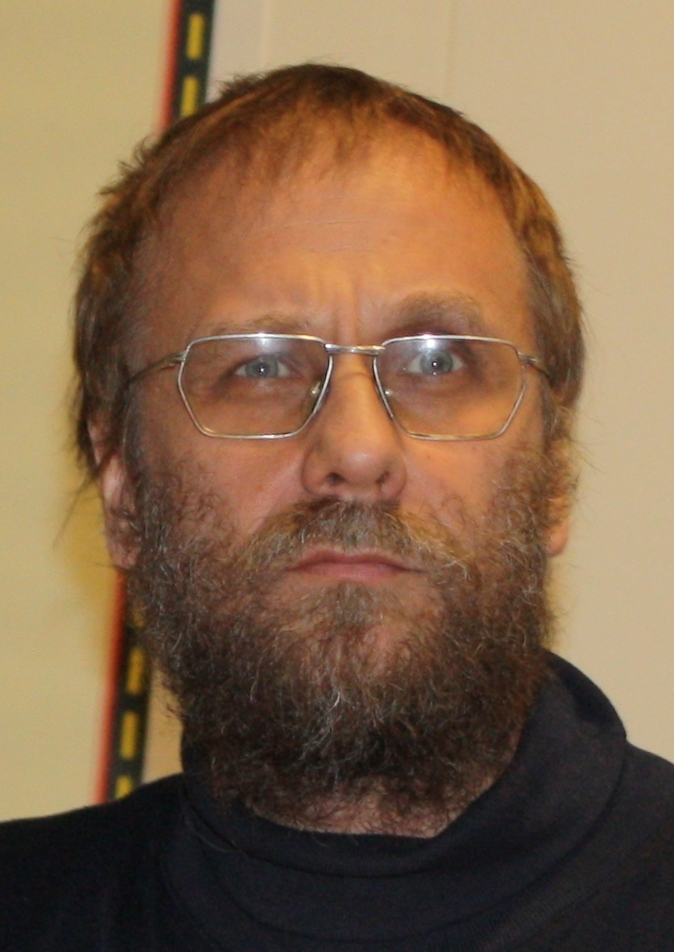
- Risto Isomäki, in 2009.

Risto Isomäki (born 8 June 1961 in Turku) is a Finnish author of science fiction books. His 2005 novel The Sands of Sarasvati (Sarasvatin hiekkaa) was nominated for the Finlandia Prize in 2005 and won the Tähtivaeltaja Award in 2006. Two of his novels, The Sands of Sarasvati (Into, 2013) and Lithium-6 (AmazonCrossing, 2015) have been published in English, along with a graphic novel adaptation of The Sands of Sarasvati (Tammi, 2008).

== Bibliography ==
- Kuluta harkiten - tietoisen kuluttajan opas (1985)
- Kristalliruusu (1991, short story collection)
- Gilgamešin tappio (1994, novel)
- Luvassa lämpenevää: ilmastonmuutos ja sen seuraukset (1996, Suomen Luonnonsuojeluliitto and Ympäristö ja kehitys ry)
- Pimeän pilven ritarit (1997, novel)
- Puukirja: puut osaratkaisuna maailman nälän ja ilmastonmuutoksen ongelmiin (1997, Ympäristö ja kehitys)
- Paljasjalkavallankumous - kymmenen vuotta myöhemmin: kehitysmaiden kansalaisyhteiskunnat ja ulkomainen rahoitus Ympäristö ja kehitys ry:n projektiyhteistyön valossa (1999, Ympäristö ja kehitys)
- Herääminen (2000, novel)
- Kohti vuotta 1929?: Vapaakauppa, työttömyys ja ääriliikkeiden nousu (2000, LIKE)
- Kohti kestävää maailmaa. Ympäristö ja kehitys ja Maan ystävät ( 2002, together with Jaana Airaksinen and Anastasia Laitila).
- The Book of Trees (2004, Other India Press) (together with Maneka Gandhi). Hindi translation: Ped Panchayat (2004)
- Sarasvatin hiekkaa (2005, novel), The Sands of Sarasvati (Into, 2013)
- Litium 6 (2007, novel), Lithium-6 (AmazonCrossing, 2015)
- 34 tapaa estää maapallon ylikuumeneminen: järkevistä vaihtoehdoista hullun tiedemiehen ratkaisuihin (2008, Tammi)
- Jumalan pikkusormi (2009, novel)
- 64 Ways to Absorb Carbon and Improve Earth's Reflectivity - From Reasonable Options to Mad Scientist Solutions (2009, Into)
- Con rit (2011, novel)
- Kurganin varjot (2014, novel)
- Haudattu uhka (2016, novel)
- Viiden meren kansa (2018, novel)
