= Farragut North (play) =

Play written by Beau Willimon

Farragut North is the 2008 Off-Broadway debut play of playwright Beau Willimon, loosely based on former Governor Howard Dean's 2004 Democratic primary election campaign for U.S. President. The original script won the 2005 Dayton Playhouse FutureFest (a festival of new plays), where it was first produced, to rave reviews by critics and a warm response from audiences.

The script has been published by Dramatists Play Service.

The play is billed as "a classic tale of hubris set against a contemporary landscape – about the lust for power and the costs one will endure to achieve it". It is titled after Farragut North, a Washington Metro station in the District of Columbia, on the Red Line. Farragut North serves downtown Washington, D.C., and is located just north of Farragut Square, near Connecticut Avenue. Willimon, who worked for Senator Chuck Schumer (D-NY) and former Governor of Vermont and 2004 Democratic presidential primary election candidate Howard Dean, titled the play for the Metrorail station located nearest to D.C.'s geographic center for think tanks, lobbyists, and other advocacy groups.

The play was presented by the Atlantic Theatre Company at Linda Gross Theater in New York City with its world premiere on November 12, 2008, in the week after the 2008 United States presidential election. The production was directed by Doug Hughes and starred John Gallagher, Jr., Chris Noth, Olivia Thirlby, Kate Blumberg and Isiah Whitlock, Jr. The production ran from October 22, 2008, to November 29, 2008, with official opening on November 12. On June 24, 2009, the production transferred to Los Angeles' Geffen Playhouse with Noth, Thirlby and Whitlock Jr. reprising their roles. Chris Pine joined the cast. Concurrently it received a production at the Contemporary American Theater Festival at Shepherd University in July 2009.

== London, United Kingdom production ==
The play received its London premiere at the Southwark Playhouse, opening on September 11, 2013. Produced by Peter Huntley, in association with Daniel Krupnik and Southwark Playhouse, and directed by Guy Unsworth, the production stars Max Irons in the role of Stephen and Rachel Tucker as Ida, and featured Shaun Williamson, Aysha Kala, Josh O'Connor, Alain Terzoli and Andrew Whipp.

The production featured design by David Woodhead, lighting by Richard Howell, music by Jude Obermüller and sound design by Peter Malkin.

== Film adaptation ==
The play has since been turned into an Oscar-nominated screenplay. The film, The Ides of March, starred and directed by George Clooney and also starred Ryan Gosling, was released by Sony Pictures in October 2011.
