= Tähtivaeltaja Award =

Annual literary award

Tähtivaeltaja Award is an annual literary prize presented by Helsingin science fiction seura ry for the best science fiction book released in Finnish.

== Recipients ==
Tähtivaeltaja Award winners and shortlists
| Year | Author | Title | Result | Ref. |
|---|---|---|---|---|
| 1985 | Cordwainer Smith | Planeetta nimeltä Shajol (The Best of Cordwainer Smith) | Winner | |
| 1986 | Joanna Russ | Naisten planeetta (The Female Man) | Winner | |
| 1987 | Greg Bear | Veren musiikkia (Blood Music) | Winner | |
| 1988 | Flann O'Brien | Kolmas konstaapeli (The Third Policeman) | Winner | |
| 1989 | Brian Aldiss | Helliconia-trilogia (Helliconia Trilogy) | Winner | |
| 1990 | Philip K. Dick | Hämärän vartija (A Scanner Darkly) | Winner | |
| 1991 | William Gibson | Neurovelho (Neuromancer) | Winner | |
| 1992 | Philip K. Dick | Oraakkelin kirja (The Man in the High Castle) | Winner | |
| 1993 | Simon Ings | Kuuma pää (Headlong) | Winner | |
| 1994 | Iain M. Banks | Pelaaja (The Player of Games) | Winner | |
| 1995 | Mary Rosenblum | Harhainvalta | Winner | |
| 1996 | Theodore Roszak | Flicker | Winner | |
| 1997 | Dan Simmons | Hyperion | Winner | |
| 1998 | Stefano Benni | Baol | Winner | |
| 1999 | Will Self | Suuret apinat (Great Apes) | Winner | |
| 2000 | Pasi Ilmari Jääskeläinen | Missä junat kääntyvät | Winner | |
| 2001 | Jonathan Lethem | Musiikkiuutisia (Gun, with Occasional Music) | Winner | |
| 2002 | Ray Loriga | Tokio ei välitä meistä enää (Tokio ya no nos quiere) | Winner | |
| 2003 | J. G. Ballard | Super-Cannes | Winner | |
| 2005 | M. John Harrison | Valo (Light) | Winner | |
| 2005 | Iain M. Banks | Tähystä tuulenpuolta | Shortlist | |
| 2005 | Mikael Niemi | Nahkakolo | Shortlist | |
| 2005 | Simon Ings | Rautakalan kaupunki | Shortlist | |
| 2005 | Tero Niemi and Anne Salminen | Nimbus ja tähdet | Shortlist | |
| 2006 | Risto Isomäki | Sarasvatin hiekkaa | Winner | |
| 2006 | Alastair Reynolds | Timanttikoirat, turkoosit päivät (Like, two novellas) | Shortlist | |
| 2006 | Johanna Sinisalo | Kädettömät kuninkaat ja muita häiritseviä tarinoita | Shortlist | |
| 2006 | Philip Roth | Salajuoni Amerikkaa vastaan | Shortlist | |
| 2006 | Ursula K. Le Guin | Pimeälipas ja muita kertomuksia | Shortlist | |
| 2007 | Stepan Chapman | Troikka (The Troika) | Winner | |
| 2007 | Benoît Duteurtre | Tyttö ja tupakka | Shortlist | |
| 2007 | J. Pekka Mäkelä | Alshain | Shortlist | |
| 2007 | Michel Houellebecq | Mahdollinen saari | Shortlist | |
| 2007 | Steve Aylett | Atomi | Shortlist | |
| 2008 | Richard Matheson | Olen legenda (I Am Legend) | Winner | |
| 2008 | Howard Waldrop | Musiikkia miesäänille ja lentäville lautasille | Shortlist | |
| 2008 | J. Pekka Mäkelä | Nedut | Shortlist | |
| 2008 | M. G. Soikkeli | Marsin ikävä ja muita kertomuksia | Shortlist | |
| 2008 | Steven Hall | Haiteksti | Shortlist | |
| 2009 | Cormac McCarthy | Tie (The Road) | Winner | |
| 2009 | David Mitchell | Pilvikartasto (Cloud Atlas) | Shortlist | |
| 2009 | M. John Harrison | Nova Swing | Shortlist | |
| 2009 | Maarit Verronen | Karsintavaihe | Shortlist | |
| 2009 | Viivi Hyvönen | Apina ja Uusikuu | Shortlist | |
| 2010 | Hal Duncan | Vellum | Winner | |
| 2010 | Charlotte Perkins Gilman | Herland | Shortlist | |
| 2010 | Michael Moorcock | Katso ihmistä! (Behold the Man) | Shortlist | |
| 2010 | Teemu Kaskinen | Sinulle, yö | Shortlist | |
| 2010 | Ursula K. Le Guin | Kahdesti haarautuva puu (The Telling) | Shortlist | |
| 2011 | Maarit Verronen | Kirkkaan selkeää | Winner | |
| 2011 | Hal Duncan | Muste (Ink) | Shortlist | |
| 2011 | Margaret Atwood | Herran tarhurit (The Year of the Flood) | Shortlist | |
| 2011 | Pat Cadigan | Mielenpeli (Mindplayers) | Shortlist | |
| 2011 | Philip K. Dick | Tohtori Veriraha (Dr. Bloodmoney) | Shortlist | |
| 2012 | Hannu Rajaniemi | Kvanttivaras (The Quantum Thief) | Winner | |
| 2012 | Alastair Reynolds | Pääteasema (Terminal World) | Shortlist | |
| 2012 | China Miéville | Toiset (The City & the City,) | Shortlist | |
| 2012 | Eija Lappalainen and Anne Leinonen | Routasisarukset | Shortlist | |
| 2012 | Johanna Sinisalo | Enkelten verta | Shortlist | |
| 2013 | Gene Wolfe | Kiduttajan varjo (The Shadow of the Torturer) | Winner | |
| 2013 | Alastair Reynolds | Pääteasema (Terminal World) | Shortlist | |
| 2013 | Alastair Reynolds | Muistoissa sininen maa (Blue Remembered Earth) | Shortlist | |
| 2013 | Emmi Itäranta | Teemestarin kirja (Memory of Water) | Shortlist | |
| 2013 | Ernest Cline | Ready Player One | Shortlist | |
| 2014 | Peter Watts | Sokeanäkö (Blindsight) | Winner | |
| 2014 | Hugh Howey | Siilo (Silo) | Shortlist | |
| 2014 | Iain Banks | Siirtymä (Transition) | Shortlist | |
| 2014 | Johanna Sinisalo | Auringon ydin | Shortlist | |
| 2014 | Lauren Beukes | Säkenöivät tytöt (The Shining Girls) | Shortlist | |
| 2015 | Antti Salminen | Lomonosovin moottori | Winner | |
| 2015 | Alastair Reynolds | Terästuulen yllä (On the Steel Breeze) | Shortlist | |
| 2015 | Jani Saxell | Sotilasrajan unet | Shortlist | |
| 2015 | Petri Laine and Anne Leinonen | Kuulen laulun kaukaisen | Shortlist | |
| 2015 | Thomas Pynchon | Painovoiman sateenkaari (Gravity's Rainbow) | Shortlist | |
| 2016 | Margaret Atwood | Uusi maa (MaddAddam) | Winner | |
| 2016 | Emmi Itäranta | Kudottujen kujien kaupunki (The City of Woven Streets) | Shortlist | |
| 2016 | Gene Wolfe | Liktorin miekka (The Sword of the Lictor) | Shortlist | |
| 2016 | Jeff VanderMeer | Hävitys (Annihilation) | Shortlist | |
| 2016 | Ursula K. Le Guin | Haikaran silmä (The Eye of the Heron) | Shortlist | |
| 2017 | Lauren Beukes | Zoo City | Winner | |
| 2017 | M. R. Carey | Maailman lahjakkain tyttö (The Girl with All the Gifts) | Shortlist | |
| 2017 | Hannu Rajaniemi | Näkymättömät planeetat (Invisible Planets) | Shortlist | |
| 2017 | Alastair Reynolds | Poseidonin lapset (Poseidon’s Wake) | Shortlist | |
| 2017 | George Saunders | Sotapuiston perikato (CivilWarLand in Bad Decline) | Shortlist | |
| 2018 | Tuomo Jäntti | Verso | Shortlist | |
| 2018 | Heikki Kännö | Mehiläistie | Shortlist | |
| 2018 | Jukka Laajarinne | Pinnan alla pimeä | Shortlist | |
| 2018 | David Mitchell | Luukellot | Shortlist | |
| 2018 | Jani Saxell | Tuomiopäivän karavaani | Shortlist | |
| 2019 | Johannes Anyuru | He hukkuvat äitiensä kyyneliin (The Rabbit Yard) | Winner | |
| 2019 | Liu Cixin | Kolmen kappaleen probleema (The Three Body Problem) | Shortlist | |
| 2019 | Hannu Rajaniemi | Kesämaa (Summerland) | Shortlist | |
| 2019 | George Saunders | Lincoln bardossa (Lincoln in the Bardo) | Shortlist | |
| 2019 | Rivers Solomon | Menneisyyden kaiku (An Unkindness of Ghosts) | Shortlist | |
| 2020 | Margaret Atwood | Testamentit (The Testaments) | Winner | |
| 2020 | Naomi Alderman | Voima (The Power) | Shortlist | |
| 2020 | Agustina Bazterrica | Rotukarja (Cadáver exquisito) | Shortlist | |
| 2020 | Peter Høeg | Sinun silmiesi kautta (Gennem dine øjne) | Shortlist | |
| 2020 | Antti Salminen | Mir | Shortlist | |
| 2021 | Emmi Itäranta | Kuunpäivän kirjeet | Winner | |
| 2021 | Laura Gustafsson | Rehab | Shortlist | |
| 2021 | Kim Liggett | Armonvuosi (The Grace Year) | Shortlist | |
| 2021 | Liu Cixin | Kuolema on ikuinen (Death’s End) | Shortlist | |
| 2021 | David Foster Wallace | Päättymätön riemu (Infinite Jest) | Shortlist | |
| 2022 | Kazuo Ishiguro | Klara ja aurinko (Klara and the Sun) | Winner | |
| 2022 | Anne-Maija Aalto | Mistä valo pääsee sisään | Shortlist | |
| 2022 | N. K. Jemisin | Viides vuodenaika (The Fifth Season) | Shortlist | |
| 2022 | Marc-Uwe Kling | QualityLand | Shortlist | |
| 2022 | Yōko Ogawa | Muistipoliisi (Hisoyaka na Kessho; The Memory Police) | Shortlist | |
| 2023 | N. K. Jemisin | Kivinen taivas (The Stone Sky) | Winner | |
| 2023 | Heikki Kännö | Ihmishämärä | Shortlist | |
| 2023 | Jens Liljestrand | Vaikka kaikki päättyisi | Shortlist | |
| 2023 | Emily St. John Mandel | Asema 11 (Station Eleven) | Shortlist | |
| 2023 | Richard Powers | Hämmästys (Bewilderment) | Shortlist | |
| 2024 | Amal El-Mohtar and Max Gladstone | Tällä tavalla hävitään aikasota (This Is How You Lose the Time War) | Winner | |
| 2024 | Jennifer Egan | Piparkakkutalo (The Candy House) | Shortlist | |
| 2024 | Fríða Ísberg | Merkintä (Marking) | Shortlist | |
| 2024 | Mia Myllymäki | Huomistarhuri (Tomorrow’s Gardener) | Shortlist | |
| 2024 | Hervé Le Tellier | Poikkeama (L’anomalie) | Shortlist | |

== See also ==
- Tähtifantasia Award
