= Fríða Ísberg =

Icelandic writer (born 1992)

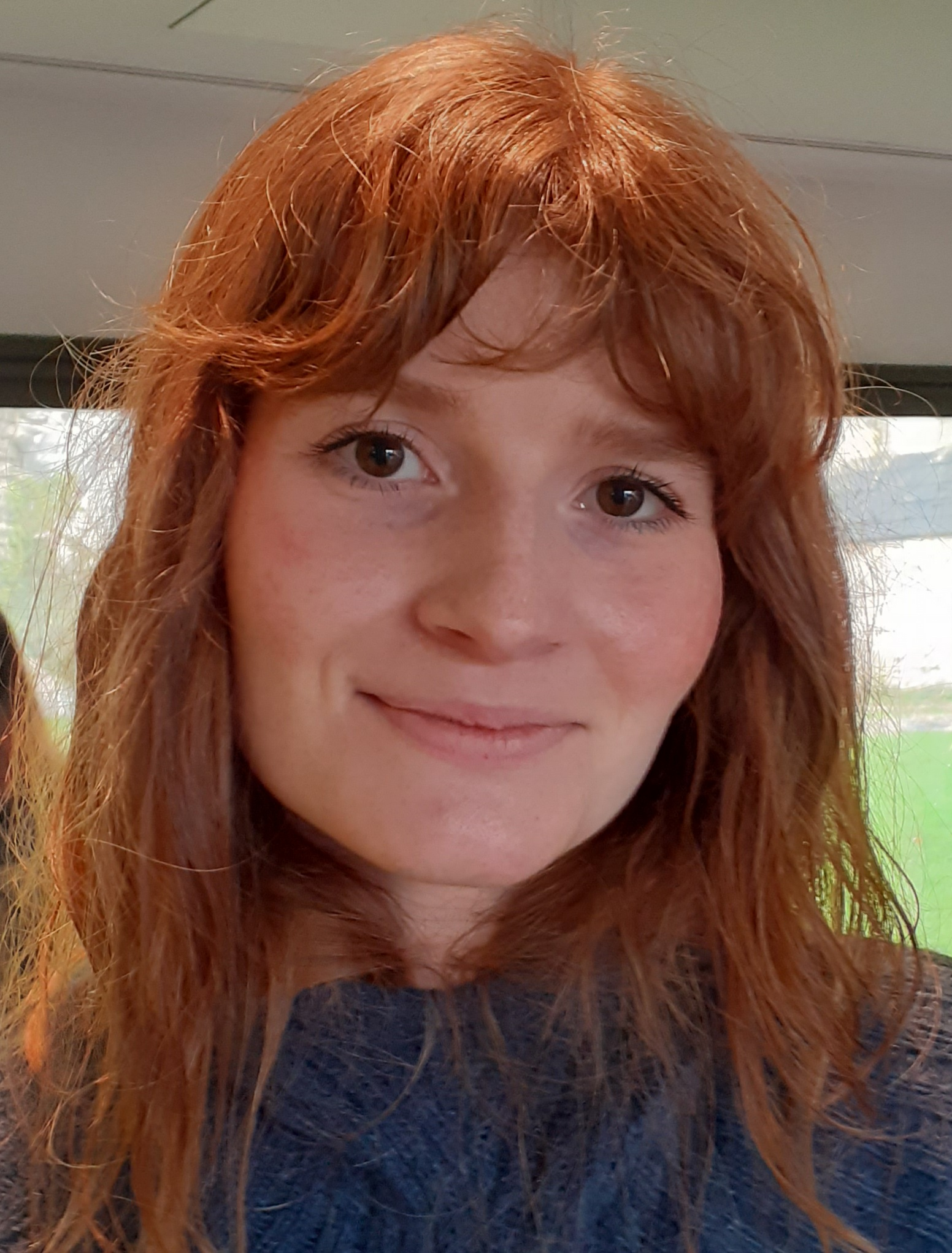
- Ísberg in 2023
- Born: 19 December 1992 (age 33); Reykjavík, Iceland
- Education: University of Iceland
- Writing career
- Notable work: Merking (2021)
- Notable awards: Per Olov Enquist Literary Prize

Fríða Ísberg (born 19 December 1992) is an Icelandic novelist, short story writer and poet. Ísberg's first book of poetry, Slitförin, won the Icelandic Booksellers' Choice Award for Poetry. Her debut novel, Merking, won the Icelandic Booksellers' Award for Fiction in 2021, the Optimist Award 2021 and the Icelandic Women's Prize for Fiction.

== Biography ==
Ísberg lives in Reykjavik and was raised by her father, a photographer. She was educated at Hamrahlíð Junior College then completed a bachelor's degree in philosophy and a master's degree in creative writing at the University of Iceland. She is a novelist, short story writer and poet. Her works have been translated into seventeen languages.

Ísberg's first book of poetry, Slitförin (Stretch Marks, 2017), won the Icelandic Booksellers' Choice Award for Poetry 2017 and was nominated for the Fjöruverðlaun Prize. She is a member of the poetry collective Svikaskáld (The Impostor Poets). Her short story collection Kláði (Itch) was nominated for the Nordic Council Literature Prize in 2020.

Ísberg's debut novel Merking (The Mark, 2021) is a speculative dystopian fiction work, set in a near future Reykjavík. The book won the Icelandic Booksellers' Award for Fiction in 2021, the Optimist Award 2021 (awarded by the President of Iceland to one national artist) and the Icelandic Women's Prize for Fiction 2022. It was shortlisted for the 2024 Tähtivaeltaja Award. It has been translated into English by Larissa Kyzer.

In 2022, Ísberg won the annual Per Olov Enquist Literary Prize, awarded to a young writer who is "set for a European breakthrough." She is the second Icelandic recipient of the award.

Ísberg also writes reviews for The Times Literary Supplement and, for the Big Issue, chose the five best novels about governments clamping down on their citizens.

== Works (selected) ==
- Slitförin (Stretch Marks), 2017.
- Kláði (Itch), 2018.
- Leðurjakkaveður (Leather Jacket Weather), 2019.
- Merking (The Mark), 2021.
- Huldukonan (The Hidden Woman), 2025.
- "Marriage Counselling" (a short story translated by Larissa Kyzer). Granta 175, 25 August 2026.
