= Breakthrough Brits =

Breakthrough Brits is a programme to honour some of Britain's best new creatives in film, television, and gaming. The programme was originally run by the now shuttered UK Film Council. It was then launched under BAFTA in 2013. There are also international categories under BAFTA Breakthrough.

The program was designed to celebrate the new British film-making talent. The 2008 programme ended in a special event in Los Angeles, compered by Nigel Lythgoe, on 5 June where honourees were presented to an audience of Hollywood industry figures.

== UK Film Council ==
Year	List
2008	John Giwa Amu; Kwame Kwei-Armah; Florence Ayisi; Noel Clarke; Esther Douglas; Kara Miller; Rita Osei; Karlene Page; Osbert Parker; Barrington Robinson; Zoe Stewart; Sunandan Walia; Yugesh Walia
2009	Dipo Agboluaje; Riz Ahmed; Eran Creevy; Yann Demange; Daniel Kaluuya; Shan Khan; Tinge Krishnan; Kolton Lee; Nahrein Mirza Kemp; China Moo Young; Mel Nwanguma; Femi Oguns; Ian Iqbal Rashid

== BAFTA ==
Year	Category	List
2013	Performers	Paul Brannigan; James Krishna Floyd; Tom Holland; Ade Oyefeso; Chloe Pirrie; Sharon Rooney; Arthur Williams
2013	Filmmakers	Rowan Athale; Ed Barratt; Dominic Mitchell; Nisha Parti; Zam Salim
2013	Gamemakers	Oliver Clarke; Rex Crowle; Sophia George; Mitu Khandaker; Dan Pearce
2014	Performers	Katie Leung; Stacy Martin; Ray Panthaki; Callum Turner
2014	Filmmaker	Jonathan Asser; Mike Brett and Steve Jamison; Tandis Jenhudson; Ashley Kendall; AJ Riach; Sarah Walker; Marc Williamson
2014	Gamemakers	Daniel Gray; Charu Desodt; Reece Millidge; William Pugh
2015	Performers	Charlie Covell; Aysha Kala; Alex Lawther; Martin McCann; Letitia Wright
2015	Filmmakers	Lauren Dark; Stephen Fingleton; Daisy-May Hudson; Regina Moriarty; Tess Morris; Ed Perkins; Jenny Saunders; Anna Valdez Hanks; Laura Wade
2015	Gamemakers	Chris Davis; Jessica Saunders; Luke Whittaker; Catherine Woolley
2016	Performers	Tom Davis; Kayode Ewumi; Malachi Kirby; Ruth Madeley; Florence Pugh
2016	Filmmakers	Michael Berliner; Eben Bolter; Nainita Desai; Marnie Dickens; Ellen Husain; Rebecca Lloyd; Vinay Patel; Helen Walsh
2016	Gamemakers	Alex Grahame; Matt Hyde; John McKellan; Tim Wicksteed; Jodie Azhar
2017	Performers	Jessie Buckley; Daisy and Charlie Cooper; Josh O'Connor; Susan Wokoma; Molly Windsor
2017	Filmmakers	Segun Akinola; Mahalia Belo; Hope Dickson Leach; Kit Fraser; Lydia Hampson; Francis Lee; Sarah Quintrell; Chloë Thomson
2017	Gamemakers	Daniel Fountain; Henry Hoffman; Anna Hollinrake; Adam & Thomas Vian; Olivia Wood
2018	Performers	Jessica Barden; Paapa Essiedu; Luisa Omielan; Annie Price; Daniel Lawrence Taylor; Chris Walley; Ria Zmitrowicz
2018	Filmmakers	Lucy Cohen; Fodhla Cronin O'Reilly; Daniel Kokotajlo (director); Michael Pearce; Vanessa Whyte; Ellena Wood
2018	Gamemakers	Jay Armstrong; Lottie Bevan; John Campbell and Katie Goode; Adrienne Law; Harry Nesbitt
2019	Performers	Niamh Algar; Vicky Knight; Chance Perdomo; Abubakar Salim
2019	Filmmakers	Sarah Brocklehurst; Stella Corradi; Daniel Dewsbury; Rose Glass; Luke Hull; Coco Jackson; Oliver Kassman; Jen Kenwood; Kayleigh Llewellyn; Simon McMahon; Laurie Nunn; Kirstie Swain
2019	Gamemakers	Chris Cox; Gemma Langford; Liam de Valmency; Lesleyann White
2020	Performers	Bukky Bakray; Youssef Kerkour; Tamara Lawrance; Amir El-Masry; Tim Renkow
2020	Filmmakers	Bim Ajadi; Abigail Dankwa; Joy Gharoro-Akpojotor; Jordan Hogg; Ruka Johnson; Aleem Khan; Ben Sharrock and Irene Gurtubai; Bethany Swan; Linn Waite and Kate Byers; Rina Yang
2020	Gamemakers	Claire Bromley; Chella Ramanan; Lea Schönfelder; Ali Tocher; Catherine Unger
2021	Performers	Elle Osili-Wood; George Robinson; Ellora Torchia; Lydia West
2021	Filmmakers	Mdhamiri á Nkemi; Prano Bailey-Bond; Georgi Banks-Davies; Heather Basten; Aisha Bywaters; Ana Naomi de Sousa; Gemma Hurley; Joe Jackson; Helen Jones; Chad Orororo; David Proud; Aaron Reid; Ashley Francis Roy; Rajita Shah; Lyttanya Shannon; PC Williams
2021	Gamemakers	Laure de Mey; Kirsty Gillmore; Joanna Haslam; Alex Kanaris-Sotiriou
2022	Performers	Rose Ayling-Ellis; Nell Barlow; Leon Harrop; Nicôle Lecky; Ambika Mod
2022	Filmmakers	Joanna Boateng; Sophie Cunningham; Chloë Fairweather; Runyararo Mapfumo; Marley Morrison; Diana Olifirova; Jack Rooke; Paul Sng; Alex Thomas; Theo Williams
2022	Gamemakers	Emily Brown; Jamal Green; Alyx Jones; Luciana Nascimento and Zachary Soares; Morag Taylor
2023	Performers	Adjani Salmon; Bella Ramsey; Rosy McEwen; Samantha Béart; Vivian Oparah
2023	Filmmakers	Cash Carraway; Charlotte Regan; Cynthia De La Rosa; Ella Glendining; Funmi Olutoye; Georgia Oakley; Kat Morgan; Kathryn Ferguson; Pete Jackson; Raine Allen-Miller; Talisha 'Tee Cee' Johnson
2023	Gamemakers	Holly Reddaway; Joel Beardshaw; Kitt Byrne; Michael Anderson
2024	Performers	Jennifer English; Kyla Harris; Mawaan Rizwan
2024	Makers	Otto Baxter; Poulomi Basu; Luna Carmoon; Shahnaz Dulaimy; Loran Dunn; Lee Getty; Harry Gilbert; Fred Hoffman; Georgina Hurcombe; Daf James; Sophie Knowles; Rochelle Newman; Beth Park; Alice Russell; Lauren Sequeira; Clair Titley; Luned Tonderai; Cobbie Yates
