= The City of Woven Streets =

2015 novel by Emmi Itäranta

The Weaver / The City of Woven Streets
- First Finnish edition
- Author: Emmi Itäranta
- Audio read by: Aysha Kala
- Original title: Kudottujen kujien kaupunki
- Language: English
- Genre: Fantasy; Speculative fiction
- Published: 2015, Teos
- Media type: Print
- Pages: 322
- ISBN: 9780007536061

The City of Woven Streets, also known as The Weaver, is the second novel by Finnish author Emmi Itäranta, published in 2015 in Finland and by the following year by HarperCollins. As with her debut novel, Itäranta wrote the Finnish and English manuscripts simultaneously. The novel was released in June 2016 in the UK under the name The City of Woven Streets, and in November 2016 in the US as The Weaver, while the Finnish version was released in October 2015 as Kudottujen kujien kaupunki. Set on an unnamed island the novel tells the first-hand story of Eliana, a young weaver, whose quiet life is suddenly shaken by the arrival of a mute girl bearing Eliana's name tattooed on her palm. Eliana finds her own shameful secrets unravelling along with those of the dystopic society she lives in, and she must learn to use her dormant skills to help those in need.

The novel won the Tampere City Literary Award and the Kuvastaja Award. It was also shortlisted for the Tähtivaeltaja Award.
