= Memory of Water (2022 film) =

- Original Finnish film poster
- Directed by: Saara Saarela
- Written by: Ilja Rautsi
- Based on: Memory of Water by Emmi Itäranta
- Produced by: Misha Jaari; Mark Lwoff
- Starring: Saga Sarkola; Mimosa Willamo; Lauri Tilkanen; Pekka Strang; Minna Haapkylä
- Cinematography: Kjell Lagerroos
- Edited by: Jussi Rautaniemi
- Music by: Hauschka
- Production companies: Bufo; Pandora Film; Allfilm; Mer Film
- Distributed by: B-Plan Distribution
- Release date: 2 September 2022 (Finland)
- Running time: 101 minutes
- Countries: Finland; Germany; Norway; Estonia
- Languages: Finnish; English
- Budget: €3.4 million

Memory of Water (Finnish: Veden vartija) is a 2022 Finnish sci-fi drama film directed by Saara Saarela. Based on the novel Memory of Water by Emmi Itäranta, the film takes place in the dystopian future in the Scandinavian Union led by a military government, where there is a shortage of fresh water as a result of an environmental disaster. The film is starring by Saga Sarkola, Mimosa Willamo, Lauri Tilkanen, Pekka Strang and Minna Haapkylä.

The film was shot in 2020 in Estonia, Germany and Norway. The actual production process of the film already started in the fall of 2015, and it was supposed to be in theaters in March 2022, but the corona restrictions moved the premiere to the fall of the same year. The film's budget was €3.4 million.

The film was premiered in Finland on 2 September 2022. It received a mixed reception from critics, partly praising its sharp world-building, while partly criticizing the clichéd plot.

== Plot ==
In the future, the world will run out of fresh water. Noria (Saga Sarkola), a young woman from a small village who is preparing to become a tea master, finds out the secret of her family: they guard a secret spring in the middle of the tundra. While the military government that controls the Scandinavian Union from Asia tightens discipline, Noria is left alone with her secret when her father (Tommi Eronen) dies. Noria finds out an even more dangerous secret from her father's remains: the "Lost Lands", thought to be polluted, may still have fresh water. Noria's only support is her cynical friend Sanja (Mimosa Willamo), who, being poorer, suffers worse from the drought. While Noria's secrets drive her and Sanja apart, Noria gets closer to the optimistic businessman Taro (Lauri Tilkanen), who says that he has come to solve the village's water shortage, but, unbeknownst to Noria, he has completely different intentions. In the end, Noria must escape, save Sanja and find out if there is still hope for the unlivable world.

== Cast ==
- Saga Sarkola as Noria
- Mimosa Willamo as Sanja
- Lauri Tilkanen as Taro
- Pekka Strang as Major Bolin
- Minna Haapkylä as Lian
- Kheba Touray as Mikoa
- Lyydia Mörä as Minja
- Yuko Takeda as Master Niiramo
- Ulla Pirttijärvi as Sámi woman
- Erol Mintas as doctor
- Tommi Eronen as father
- Milka Ahlroth as scientist on a CD

== See also ==
- List of Finnish films of the 2020s
- List of dystopian films
