= Pendatang (film) =

Malaysian dramatic film

- The full feature film.
- Directed by: Ng Ken Kin
- Screenplay by: Lim Boon Siang
- Produced by: Amir Muhammad; Elise Shick; James Chong; Gabrielle Lee; Ang Wei Xin
- Starring: Fredy Chan; Mayjune Tan; Shareen Yeo; Kyzer Tou; Qaidah Marha
- Cinematography: Teck Zee Tan
- Edited by: Yap Mun Ee Chloe
- Music by: Wey Yinn Teo
- Production company: Kuman Pictures
- Release date: December 21, 2023 (YouTube)
- Running time: 98 minutes
- Country: Malaysia
- Languages: Cantonese, Malay, Tamil

Pendatang is a 2023 Malaysian dystopian drama thriller film directed by Ng Ken Kin and written by Lim Boon Siang. Produced by Kuman Pictures in association with Tapir Films, Pendatang follows a Cantonese–speaking Chinese family forced to relocate to a rural kampong home, shortly after Malaysia (Note: In the film, the states of Sarawak and Sabah had seceded from Malaysia.) implemented the fictional Segregation Act, where racial segregation between the ethnic groups of the country became strictly enforced.

Pendatang is a fully crowdfunded movie. Ng Ken Kin, the director, stated that he did not feel the movie would have been approved for local cinematic release by the Film Censorship Board. Hence, the film is available on YouTube for free. The film does not make any advertising revenue and is non-profit driven. The film premiered on YouTube on December 21, 2023.

== Development ==
Pendatang is a fully crowdfunded movie. In 2022, Kuman Pictures raised a total of RM335,981 through the crowdfunding campaign on the platform, Indiegogo. The production team chose to be fully crowd funded to ensure the film would be faithful to the script without limitations that traditional government and commercially led productions and funding options may have imposed.

== Cast ==
- Fredy Chan as Wong
- Mayjune Tan as Shan
- Shareen Yeo as Xin
- Kyzer Tou as Bobby
- Qaidah Marha as Raifa / Panda
- Nick Davis as Ho
- Kent Tan as Vincent
- Grace Ng as Botak
- Julie Chew as Auntie Koo
- Dave Tan as Eddie
- Azman Hassan as Hamid
- Devakar Rajah as Siva
- Jasmin Lyn as Sangeetha G
- Afry Wijoyo as Malay Militiaman
- Jonathan Cheong as Beard Man
- Chuan Boon Loh as Tattoo Guy
- David Cheah as Fatty Guy
- Loh Shu Jin as Skinny Guy

== Release ==
Pendatang premiered for free on YouTube on the 21st of December 2023.

== Critical reception ==
The film received generally positive reviews from The Rakyat Post and the South China Morning Post.

== See also ==
- Article 153 of the Constitution of Malaysia
- Bumiputera (Malaysia)
- Ketuanan Melayu
- Pendatang asing
