= Ink (novel) =

2007 speculative fiction novel by Hal Duncan

Ink: The Book of All Hours 2
- Ink first edition cover.
- Author: Hal Duncan
- Cover artist: Art direction and design Neil Lang; Illustration Christopher Gibbs
- Language: English
- Series: The Book of all Hours
- Genre: Speculative fiction
- Publisher: Pan Macmillan
- Publication date: 2007
- Publication place: United Kingdom
- Media type: Print
- Pages: 600
- ISBN: 978-0-330-43838-4
- Preceded by: Vellum

Ink: The Book of All Hours 2 is a speculative fiction novel by Hal Duncan.

It is Duncan's second novel and a sequel to Vellum: The Book of All Hours. It was first published in the United Kingdom by Pan Macmillan in February 2007 and, later that same month, in the US by Del Rey, an imprint of Random House.

== Introduction ==
The Vellum is a reality of which Earth is only a small part. It can be reprogrammed using something called the Cant, and this is what some deities from ancient myths, called the Unkin, have done. One group of Unkin see themselves as angels, and have set up a Covenant promising to reject any ancient deity looking to regain his or her past glory; they are at the time of the narration getting ready for a final war. A group of newly born Unkin (one can become an Unkin through certain unspecified events in his or her life) who refuse to take part in such war are the main characters: Thomas Messenger, a homosexual young man who is trying to disappear into the Vellum where he will never be found; Jack Carter, a Covenant spear-carrier sent to kill Thomas but in love with him; Joey Pechorin, a Russian Army officer and torture expert; also present, although less than in Vellum, are Seamus Finnan, an Irish angel hiding out in the desert; Phreedom Messenger, Thomas's sister and a trailer park biker trying to avoid conscription and Don MacChuill, a brash Scotsman.

Besides the myths and legends referred to, there are also several very vivid references to history, with some of the characters living through events such as the Glasgow 1919 Battle of George Square.

The seven main characters are archetypes of characters from myths and legends: Jack, also known as Jack Flash, Spring Heeled Jack, Iacchus and Captain Jack Carter (a legendary World War I hero in one of the parallel worlds in which the novel is set); Thomas Messenger, also known as Puck, Tamuz and Matthew Shepard; Phreedom Messenger, known as Anna, Anaesthesia and Inanna; Guy Fox, who is also Guy Fawkes (although closer to his representation in V for Vendetta than to the historic character), Guy Reynard, the Prussian Baron Reinhardt); Joey Pickering (also Pechorin, Joey Narchosis and Judas); Don MacChuill (also Don Coyote, Don Quixote) and Seamus Finnan (Shammus, Finnegan, Prometheus, Samuel Hobbsbaum, Sammael).

From a psychoanalytic point of view, the seven main characters can also be seen as the Super-ego as guiding conscience (Guy/Reynard), the wild and libidinous Id (Jack), the Anima and Animus as a triple goddess/god figure (Phreedom), the "inner child" of the Self (Thomas), the Ego that has to deal with society and reality (Seamus), the Shadow as the dark side (Joey), and the wise hermit or old soldier as an image of age and experience (Don).

The homosexual theme is also strongly referred to, especially in the character of Thomas/Puck and his relationship with Jack. Puck is explicitly identified with Matthew Shephard.

The main characters' story is framed within the story of the Book of All Hours, a tome in which Metatron, the scribe of the Covenant, has inscribed the destiny of the whole Vellum; the book has been stolen by Guy Reynard, who uses it to travel through the Vellum. This frame story appears in short sections called Errata, at the end of each chapter.

The events in the novel are described in a non-linear order, with several skips ahead and back in time. In the first part of the novel, "Hinter's Knights", Euripides's The Bacchae is not only referenced but (loosely) enacted by the characters on a stage, while the second part, "Eastern Mourning", hints more or less subtly to various passages of the Bible, more specifically the Old Testament, with a particular focus on the stories of Sodom and the Binding of Isaac, both in the Book of Genesis.

== Reception ==
The reception to Ink varied. Some critics found it confusing, although most admitted its stylistic value, while others appreciated its experimental nature.

== Awards ==
Ink has been shortlisted for the 2011 Tähtivaeltaja Awards, assigned to the best science fiction novel released in Finland (and in Finnish) during the previous year.

== Translations ==
Ink has been translated into German by Hannes Riffel, Finnish by Nina Saikkonen, French by Florence Dolisi, Spanish by Luis Gallego Tévar and Polish by Anna Reszka.
