= List of dystopian music =

== Artists ==
The following lists musical artists whose discography prominently features dystopian themes.

- Rock band Big Black with their stark portrayals of the underside of American culture.

== Albums ==
The following lists albums that prominently feature dystopian themes.

- 2112, an album by the Canadian rock band Rush, released in 1976. The title track is about a man living in a dystopian society.
- The ArchAndroid by Janelle Monáe.
- Diamond Dogs an album by David Bowie is loosely based on George Orwell's Nineteen Eighty-Four especially the songs "Future Legend", "We Are The Dead", "1984" and "Big Brother".
- Deltron 3030 by Deltron 3030 (Del the Funky Homosapien, Dan the Automator, and Kid Koala), is a hip hop album about a future world of battle raps with aliens, government oppression, and space travel.
- Funkentelechy vs. the Placebo Syndrome by Parliament.
- In the Court of the Crimson King by King Crimson.
- Joe's Garage, a dystopian concept album by Frank Zappa, set in a world where music is illegal and crimes are punished preemptively.
- Kid A by Radiohead.
- The Protomen, its prequel Act II: The Father of Death, and sequel Act III: This City Made Us by the Protomen.
- Replicas by Gary Numan.
- Year Zero (2007) by Nine Inch Nails is a concept album with a strong dystopian theme and an accompanying alternate reality game.
- The Body, The Blood, The Machine, an album by The Thermals.

== Songs ==
- "1999" by Prince.
- "Idioteque" by Radiohead.
- "In the year 2525" by Zager and Evans.
- "Karn Evil 9" by Emerson, Lake & Palmer.
- "The Apocalypse Song" by St. Vincent.
- "Talkin' World War III Blues" by Bob Dylan.
- "Testify" by Rage Against the Machine.
