= Hal Duncan =

Scottish writer (born 1971)

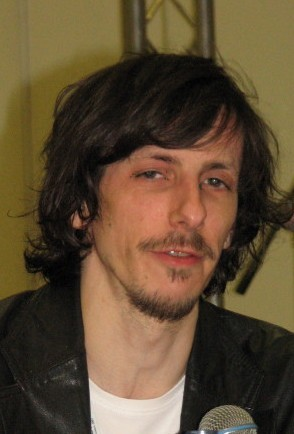
- Duncan at Polcon 2007
- Born: 21 October 1971 (age 54); Kilwinning, Ayrshire, Scotland
- Citizenship: United Kingdom
- Education: Glasgow University
- Occupations: Science fiction and fantasy writer
- Writing career
- Notable works: Vellum – The Book of All Hours; Ink – The Book of All Hours 2 Escape from Hell! Songs for the Devil and Death
- Website: notesfromthegeekshow.blogspot.com

Hal Duncan (born 21 October 1971, real name Alasdair) is a Scottish science fiction and fantasy writer.

His works have been listed in the New Weird genre, but he prefers not to ascribe his writings to any genre.

== Life ==
Hal Duncan was born in Kilwinning, Ayrshire, in 1971 and grew up "in small town Ayrshire" before relocating to Glasgow, where he graduated from Glasgow University and where he still resides. Before becoming a full-time writer he used to work as a computer programmer, a job that he quit in 2005.

He is openly gay and terms himself a "Sodomite". Occasionally he fashions himself as "THE.... Sodomite Hal Duncan" (sic) after receiving hate mail defining him by this expression, as reported on his personal weblog.

He is also very outspoken politically and considers himself an "anarcho-socialist who recognizes that democracy's the least of all possible evils" but also "a little bit liberal."

He is an active member of the Glasgow Science Fiction Writers Circle and he took part in the spoken word performance group Word Dogs, organised by some of the members of the Circle.

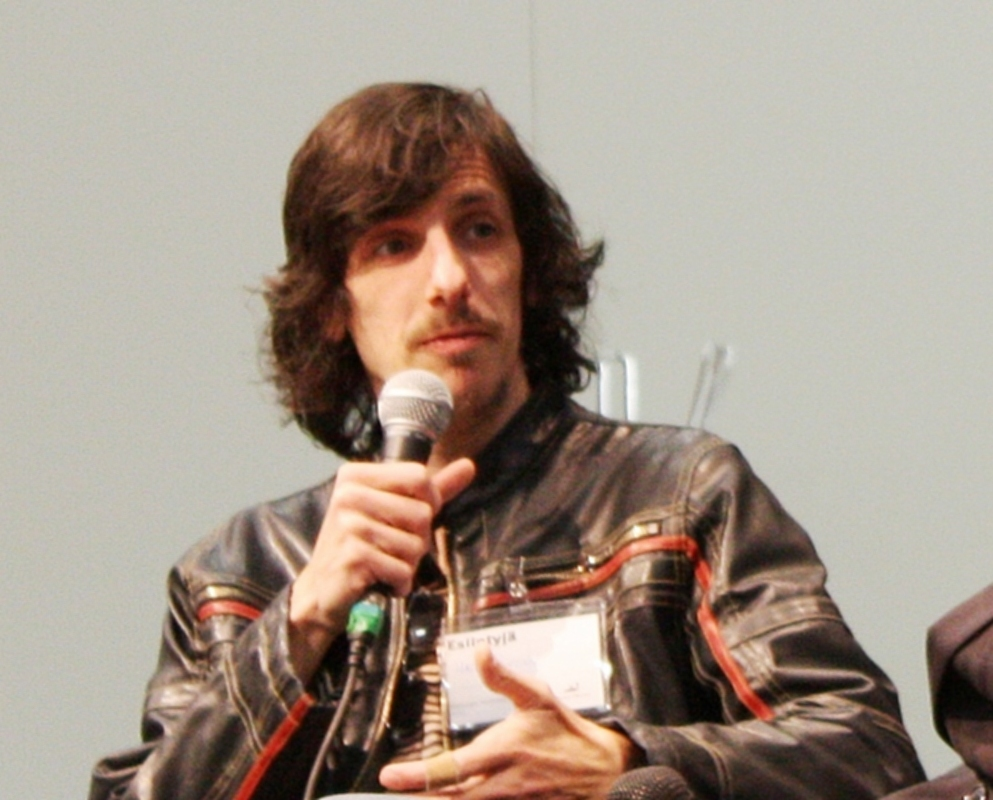
Hal Duncan at Helsinki Book Fair 2009

== Works ==
Hal Duncan listed amongst his inspirations and influences such diverse authors as James Joyce, William S. Burroughs, Alfred Bester, H. P. Lovecraft, Neal Stephenson, Michael de Larrabeiti, Philip K. Dick, Robert A. Heinlein, Samuel R. Delany, Wallace Stevens, William Blake, Michael Moorcock, Harold Pinter and Jorge Luis Borges.

=== Prose ===
==== Vellum ====
His first novel, Vellum – The Book of All Hours, was released by Pan Macmillan in August 2005. It was nominated for the World Fantasy Award and the Locus Award, and won the Spectrum and the Tähtivaeltaja Awards. It is about a war between Heaven and Hell fought in a reality of which Earth is only a fragment; in this reality, called Vellum, live the Unkin (Angels and Demons). The events in the novel are described in a non-linear order, with several skips ahead and back in time. The story of the characters is linked to the Sumerian myth of Inanna and her descent to the underworld and to Aeschylus's tragedy Prometheus Bound. It is divided in two parts dedicated to the seasons of summer (entitled ""The Lost Deus of Sumer") and fall (entitled "Evenfall Leaves").

Vellum has been translated amongst others into German (by Hannes Riffel), Finnish (by Nina Saikkonen), French (by Florence Dolisi), Spanish (by Luis Gallego Tevar), Italian (by Stefania Di Natale) and Polish (by Anna Reszka).

==== Ink ====
Its sequel, Ink – The Book of All Hours 2, was published in February 2007. Its two parts are linked to the two remaining seasons, winter (entitled "Hinter's Knights") and spring ("Eastern Mourning"), and it continues the narrative (and the style) of the first instalment. The ancient works here referred to are Euripides's The Bacchae and the Old Testament. Ink has been shortlisted for the 2011 Tähtivaeltaja Awards.

Ink has been translated into German by Hannes Riffel, Finnish by Nina Saikkonen, French by Florence Dolisi, Spanish by Luis Gallego Tévar and Polish by Anna Reszka.

==== Escape from Hell! ====
In 2008 he published for Monkeybrain Escape from Hell!, a novella inspired by the 1981 movie Escape from New York and the 1990 movie Jacob's Ladder in which four characters ("a hitman, a hooker, a hobo and a homo") try to flee from Hell, here represented as a dystopian version of Manhattan in which all the damned see their punishment continuously televised. Duncan has declared that he is planning two sequels for it, Assault! On Heaven! and Battle! For the Planet! Of the Dead!.

It has been translated into French by Florence Dolisi as Evadés de l'Enfer!, being published by Éditions Gallimard in October 2010, and in Finnish by Einari Aaltonen.

==== An A–Z of the Fantastic City ====
In May 2011 Duncan announced the publication of An A–Z of the Fantastic City, a "chapbook" for Small Beer Press, initially due to be released in February 2012. The volume, illustrated by Eric Schaller, deals with twenty-six cities, both real (Dublin, Guernica, Jerusalem, London, Washington) and imaginary (Erewhon, Camelot, R'lyeh, Tir-na-Nog, Urville). After some delays, it was published in April 2012 in three formats: a limited edition, numbered and signed hardcover format (89 copies), trade paperback and e-book.

==== Susurrus On Mars ====
In 2017 he published for Lethe Press the Delaneyesque novella Susurrus On Mars, set in a far future terraformed Mars. A love story patterned after ancient Greece is interspersed with sections on botany and the mythical origins of plants.

=== Short stories ===
Amongst the short stories he published are The Angel of Gamblers in Eidolon I, edited by Jonathan Strahan and Jeremy G. Byrne (2006), The Last Straw in Glorifying Terrorism, edited by Farah Mendlesohn (2007), and The Tower of Morning's Bones in Paper Cities: An Anthology of Urban Fantasy, edited by Ekaterina Sedia (2008). The Tower of Morning's Bones is one of the four previously published stories collected in Errata. He also participated in Ann and Jeff VanderMeer's Last Drink Bird Head (2009), an experiment in which 70 writers were asked the same question ("Who or what is Last Drink Bird Head?"), published by Ministry of Whimsy with the profits donated to the ProLiteracy Worldwide Organization.

Three short story collections in Duncan's 'scruffian' sequence, a queer take on the Borribles, have been published: Fabbles: 1 (sic), Scruffians!, and A Scruffian Survival Guide. (Fabbles: 1 collects three previously e-published pieces, including The Taking of the Stamp. Scruffians! collects mostly previously published pieces.)

=== Poetry ===
Besides the two poetry collections Sonnets for Orpheus and The Lucifer Cantos published in very limited, handbound editions (26 and 24 copies) by Papaveria Press in 2006 and 2010 respectively, he has made most of his poetry publicly available through his blog, convinced that "there's no money in poetry. If I wanted to be read, I'm just as happy to post online and let people read it there."

==== Songs for the Devil and Death ====
In July 2011 Papaveria Press published Songs for the Devil and Death, which includes the poems originally published in Sonnets for Orpheus and The Lucifer Cantos with the addition of several others.

== Other activities ==
Hal Duncan participated in the album Ballads of the Book with a poem, "If You Love Me You'd Destroy Me", put in music by Aereogramme.

He also wrote a musical, Nowhere Town, that he defines a "punk rock opera" and a "gay punk Orpheus". It has been premiered in June 2010 in Chicago by the University theatre group, directed by Beth Walker. He made the libretto and the vocal tracks available for download through his blog.

He writes a monthly column on BSCreview entitled Notes from New Sodom, keeps a blog called Notes from the Geek Show and is active on Twitter.

He contributed to Dan Savage's It Gets Better project.

He wrote essays related to myth and literature, some of which are available online.

He made recordings of some of his readings publicly available through his blog; some can be freely downloaded while others are being sold for a fee.

For his activity as a blogger he has been nominated for the 2009/2010 Last Drink Bird Head Award in the field of "Gentle Advocacy" ("In recognition of individuals willing to enter into blunt discourse about controversial issues"), but lost the award to Ay-leen the Peacemaker from Beyond Victoriana. In 2009 he was nominated for the same award but in the category "Expanding Our Vocabulary" ("In recognition of writers whose fiction or nonfiction exposes readers to new words and, often, new ideas"). The award went to John Clute.

On 6 September 2011 Hal Duncan took part in a "Literary Death Match" in Edinburgh. In the event, organised and hosted by Literary Death Match co-creator Todd Zuniga, he was pitted against Doug Johnstone, Sophie Cooke and Katerina Vasiliou. Duncan was declared the winner after a "shootout" against Vasiliou.

Duncan was one of the five judges for the 2012 British Fantasy Awards.

== Bibliography ==
=== Novels ===
==== The Book of All Hours series ====
- Vellum. London (UK), Pan Macmillan, 2005. ISBN 978-1-4050-5208-5
- Ink. London (UK), Pan Macmillan, 2007. ISBN 978-0-330-43838-4

==== Other Novels ====
- Testament (2015)

=== Novellas ===
- Escape from Hell!. Austin (TX, USA), MonkeyBrain Books, 2008. ISBN 978-1-932265-25-5
- The Taking of the Stamp. Los Angeles (CA, USA), LA CASE Books, 2013. ISBN 978-8-868700-07-2
- Susurrus On Mars. Maple Shade (NJ, USA), Lethe Press, 2017. ISBN 978-1-59021-683-5

=== Collections of short stories ===
- An A-Z of the Fantastic City. Easthampton (MA, USA), Small Beer Press, 2012. ISBN 978-1-61873-020-6
- Errata. New Sodom Press, 2013. ISBN 978-1-300820-47-5
- Fabbles: 1. New Sodom Press, 2013. ISBN 978-1-291-64329-9
- Scruffians!. Maple Shade (NJ, USA), Lethe Press, 2014. ISBN 978-1-59021-394-0
- A Scruffian Survival Guide. New Sodom Press, 2017. ISBN 978-0-244-01599-2

=== Poetry ===
- Sonnets for Orpheus. Wakefield (UK), Papaveria Press, 2006. No ISBN (limited edition of 26 copies)
- The Lucifer Cantos. Wakefield (UK), Papaveria Press, 2010. No ISBN (limited edition of 24 copies)
- Songs for the Devil and Death. Wakefield (UK), Papaveria Press, 2011. ISBN 978-1-907881-04-6

=== Anthologies edited ===
- Caledonia Dreamin' - Strange Fiction of Scottish Descent.
