= List of dystopian comics =

This is a list of dystopian comics.

- Akira by Katsuhiro Otomo
- American Flagg! by Howard Chaykin
- Bitch Planet by Kelly Sue DeConnick and Valentine De Landro
- Ronin by Frank Miller
- The Uncanny X-Men (#141–142): "Days of Future Past" by Chris Claremont, John Byrne, and Terry Austin
- Sabre by Don McGregor and Paul Gulacy
- V for Vendetta by Alan Moore follows the exploits of the anarchist V and his struggle in a Britain ruled by a fascist party.

== See also ==
- Lists of dystopian works
