= Memory of Water =

2014 novel by Emmi Itäranta

- First Finnish p/b edition
- Author: Emmi Itäranta
- Original title: Teemestarin kirja
- Language: English
- Genre: Climate fiction Speculative fiction
- Publication date: 2012 (Teos)
- English publication date: 2014 (HarperCollins)
- Media type: Print
- Pages: 266
- ISBN: 9780007529919

Memory of Water (Finnish: Teemestarin kirja, "The Tea Master's Book") is the debut novel by Finnish author Emmi Itäranta, published in 2014 by HarperCollins. The Finnish version of the novel, which Itäranta wrote simultaneously along with the English one, was published in Finland in 2013 by the publishing house Teos. Set in a dystopian future where fresh water is scarce, it tells the story of Noria, a young tea master's apprentice, who must come to terms with a great secret and even greater responsibility that follows this knowledge.

The Finnish manuscript won the Fantasy and Sci-Fi Literary Fiction contest organised by Teos in 2012 and was subsequently published. The book won the Kalevi Jäntti Award in 2012, and the Nuori Aleksis Award in 2013. It was also shortlisted for the 2013 Tähtivaeltaja Award.

The English language version of the book has been featured on several shortlists in both the US and the UK - the Philip K. Dick Award, Compton Crook Award, Golden Tentacle Award and Arthur C. Clarke Award. The novel also appeared on the 2014 James Tiptree, Jr. Award Honor List.

In 2022, a film adaptation based on the novel was released, directed by Saara Saarela and starring Saga Sarkola.
