= Vellum (novel) =

British science fiction novel

Vellum: The Book of All Hours
- Vellum first edition cover.
- Author: Hal Duncan
- Cover artist: Chris Shamwana and Neil Lang
- Language: English
- Series: The Book of all Hours
- Genre: Speculative fiction
- Publisher: Pan Macmillan
- Publication date: 2005
- Publication place: United Kingdom
- Media type: Print
- Pages: 480
- ISBN: 978-1-4050-5208-5
- Followed by: Ink

Vellum: The Book of All Hours is a speculative fiction novel by Hal Duncan.

It is Duncan's first novel. It was first published in the United Kingdom by Pan Macmillan in August 2005 and then, in April 2006, in the USA by Del Rey, an imprint of Random House.

== Introduction ==
The Vellum is a reality of which Earth is only a small part. It can be reprogrammed using something called the Cant, and this is what some deities from ancient myths, called the Unkin, have done. One group of Unkin see themselves as Angels, and have set up a Covenant promising to reject any ancient deity looking to regain his or her past glory; they are at the time of the narration getting ready for a final war. A group of newly born Unkin (one can become an Unkin through certain unspecified events in his or her life) who refuse to take part in such war are the main characters: Seamus Finnan, an Irish angel hiding out in the desert; Phreedom Messenger, a trailer park biker trying to avoid conscription; Thomas Messenger, her gay brother who is trying to disappear into the Vellum where he will never be found; Jack Carter, a Covenant spear-carrier sent to kill Thomas but in love with him. Next to them are Joey Pechorin and Don MacChuill (who will gain more importance in Ink, the sequel to Vellum).

The main characters' story is framed within the story of the Book of All Hours, a tome in which Metatron, the scribe of the Covenant, has inscribed the destiny of the whole Vellum; the book has been stolen by Guy Reynard, who uses it to travel through the Vellum. This frame story appears in short sections called Errata, at the end of each chapter.

The events in the novel are described in a non-linear order, with several skips ahead and back in time. The story of the characters is linked to the Sumerian myth of Inanna and her descent to the underworld and to Aeschylus's tragedy Prometheus Bound. It is divided in two parts dedicated to the seasons of Summer, entitled "The Lost Deus of Sumer", and Fall, called "Evenfall Leaves".

Besides the myths and legends referred to, there are also several very vivid references to history, with some of the characters living through such events as the Battle of the Somme or the Glasgow 1919 Battle of George Square.

The seven main characters are archetypes of characters from myths and legends: Jack, also known as Jack Flash, Spring Heeled Jack, Iacchus and Captain Jack Carter (a legendary World War I hero in one of the parallel worlds in which the novel is set), also inspired by Luther Arkwright and Michael Moorcock's Oswald Bastable and Jerry Cornelius; Thomas Messenger, also known as Puck, Tamuz and Matthew Shepard; Phreedom Messenger, known as Anna, Anaesthesia and Inanna; Guy Fox, who is also Guy Fawkes (although closer to his representation in V for Vendetta than to the historic character), Guy Reynard and the Prussian Baron Reinhardt; Joey Pechorin (also Joey Narchosis and Judas) Don MacChuill (also Don Coyote, Don Quixote) and Seamus Finnan (Shammus, Finnegan, Prometheus, Samuel Hobbsbaum, Sammael).

From a psychoanalytic point of view, the seven main characters can also be seen as the Super-ego as guiding conscience (Guy/Reynard), the wild and libidinous Id (Jack), the Anima and Animus as a triple goddess/god figure (Phreedom), the “inner child” of the Self (Thomas), the Ego that has to deal with society and reality (Seamus), the Shadow as the dark side (Joey), and the wise hermit or old soldier as an image of age and experience (Don).

The author himself defined his novel "a Cubist epic fantasy".

The homosexual theme is also strongly referred to, especially in the character of Thomas/Puck and his relationship with Jack. Puck is explicitly identified with Matthew Shephard.

== Reception ==
The reception to Vellum varied.

Some critics found it confusing, although most admitted its stylistic value, while others appreciated its experimental nature.

It has been criticised as too much focused on "being cool", even though the depth of Duncan's research cannot be denied.

== Awards ==
Vellum was nominated for the 2006 World Fantasy Award, won by Haruki Murakami with Kafka on the Shore, and the 2006 Locus Award in the "Best First Novel" category, won by Elizabeth Bear with her trilogy formed by Hammered, Scardown and Worldwired.

It won the 2007 Spectrum Award for the best novel published in the United States by an LGBT writer and the 2010 Tähtivaeltaja Award for the best science fiction novel published in Finnish.

== Translations ==
Vellum has been translated into German by Hannes Riffel, Finnish by Nina Saikkonen, French by Florence Dolisi, Italian by Stefania Di Natale, Spanish by Luis Gallego Tévar and Polish by Anna Reszka.
