= Emmi Itäranta =

Finnish novelist (born 1976)

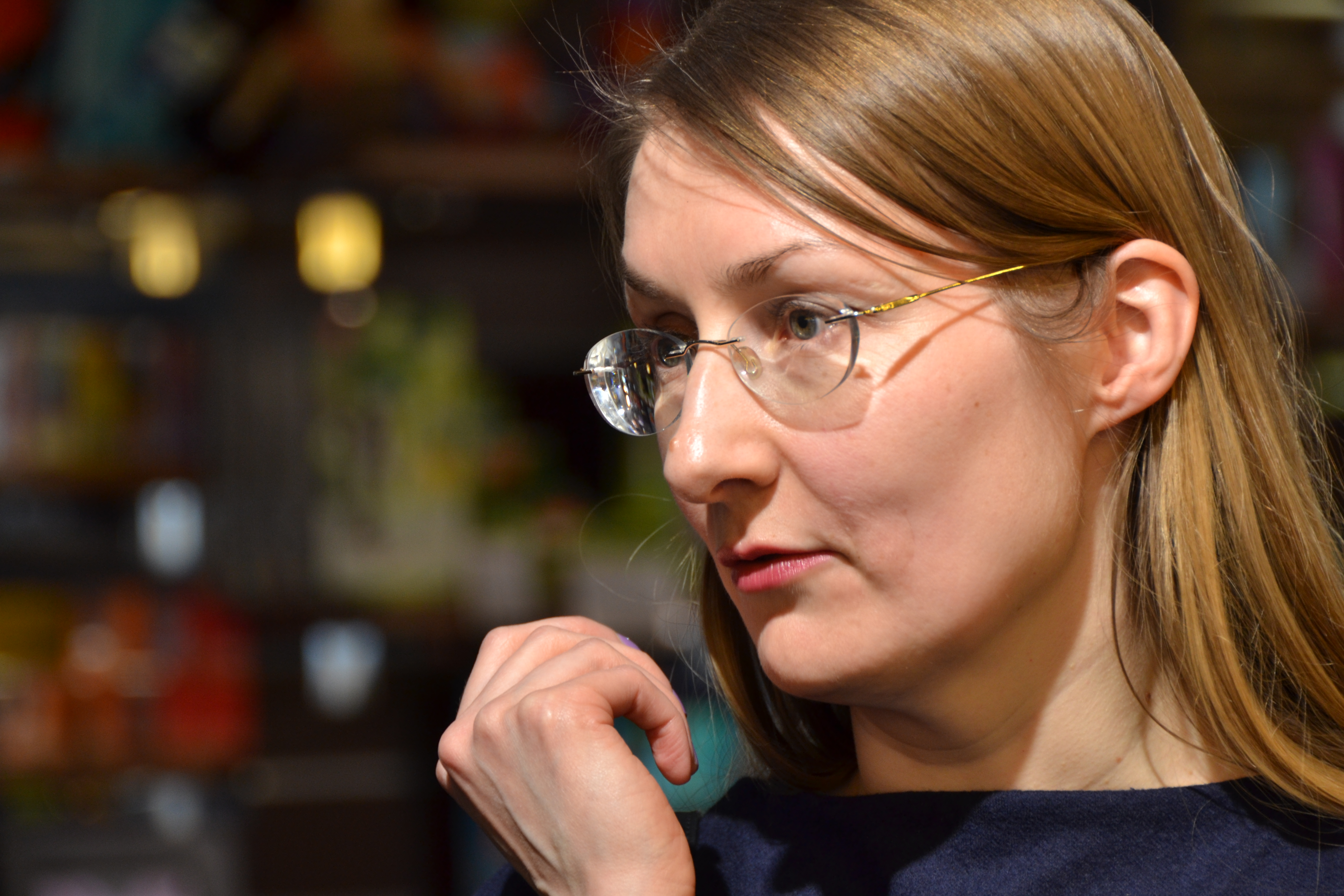
- Emmi Itäranta at Koolibri in Tallinn, in 2014
- Born: 1976 (age 49–50); Tampere, Finland
- Education: University of Tampere; University of Kent
- Occupation: Novelist
- Writing career
- Language: Finnish, English
- Genres: Speculative fiction, science fiction
- Notable works: Memory of Water 2014; The City of Woven Streets 2016
- Website: www.emmiitaranta.com

Emmi Elina Itäranta (born 1976) is a Finnish novelist. Her debut novel Memory of Water was published by HarperCollins in 2014.

== Biography ==
Born in Tampere, Finland, Itäranta holds a MA in drama from the University of Tampere, and worked as a columnist, theatre critic, script writer and press officer after graduation. In 2007 she enrolled in the postgraduate program of University of Kent, where she began writing her debut novel as a part of her Creative Writing course work. Working simultaneously in English and her native Finnish, Itäranta completed both manuscripts, and in 2011 the Finnish version won the Fantasy and Sci-Fi Literary Fiction contest organised by the Finnish publishing house Teos. The novel was published by Teos in 2012 under the name Teemestarin kirja (lit. "The Tea Master's Book"). The book won the Kalevi Jäntti Award in 2012, and the Nuori Aleksis Award in 2013. It was also shortlisted for the 2013 Tähtivaeltaja Award.

The English version of the book, Memory of Water, was published by HarperCollins in 2014 in the United States, United Kingdom and Australia. It has been nominated for the 2014 Philip K. Dick Award, as well as the Golden Tentacle Award and the Arthur C. Clarke Award. Translation rights of the book have been sold to 21 territories to date, and it has already been published in Arabic, Czech, Danish, Estonian, French, Georgian, German, Hungarian, Italian, Japanese, Latvian, Lithuanian, Norwegian, Portuguese, Spanish and Turkish. The Italian version of the book, La Memoria dell'Acqua, was published by Frassinelli and was among the three final nominees for the Premio Salerno Libro d'Europa in 2016.

Itäranta's second novel was published in October 2015 in Finnish, as Kudottujen kujien kaupunki. It too was nominated for the 2016 Tähtivaeltaja Award, and was one of the novels to receive the City of Tampere Literary Award. The English language version was published in 2016, under the name The City of Woven Streets in the UK, and as The Weaver in the US and Canada.

Her third novel The Moonday Letters was published in the US and UK July 2022 by Titan Books.

Itäranta lives in Canterbury, United Kingdom.

== Works ==
- Memory of Water (2014)
- The City of Woven Streets (2016)
- The Moonday Letters (2022)
