= Márton Simon =

Hungarian poet and translator (born 1984)

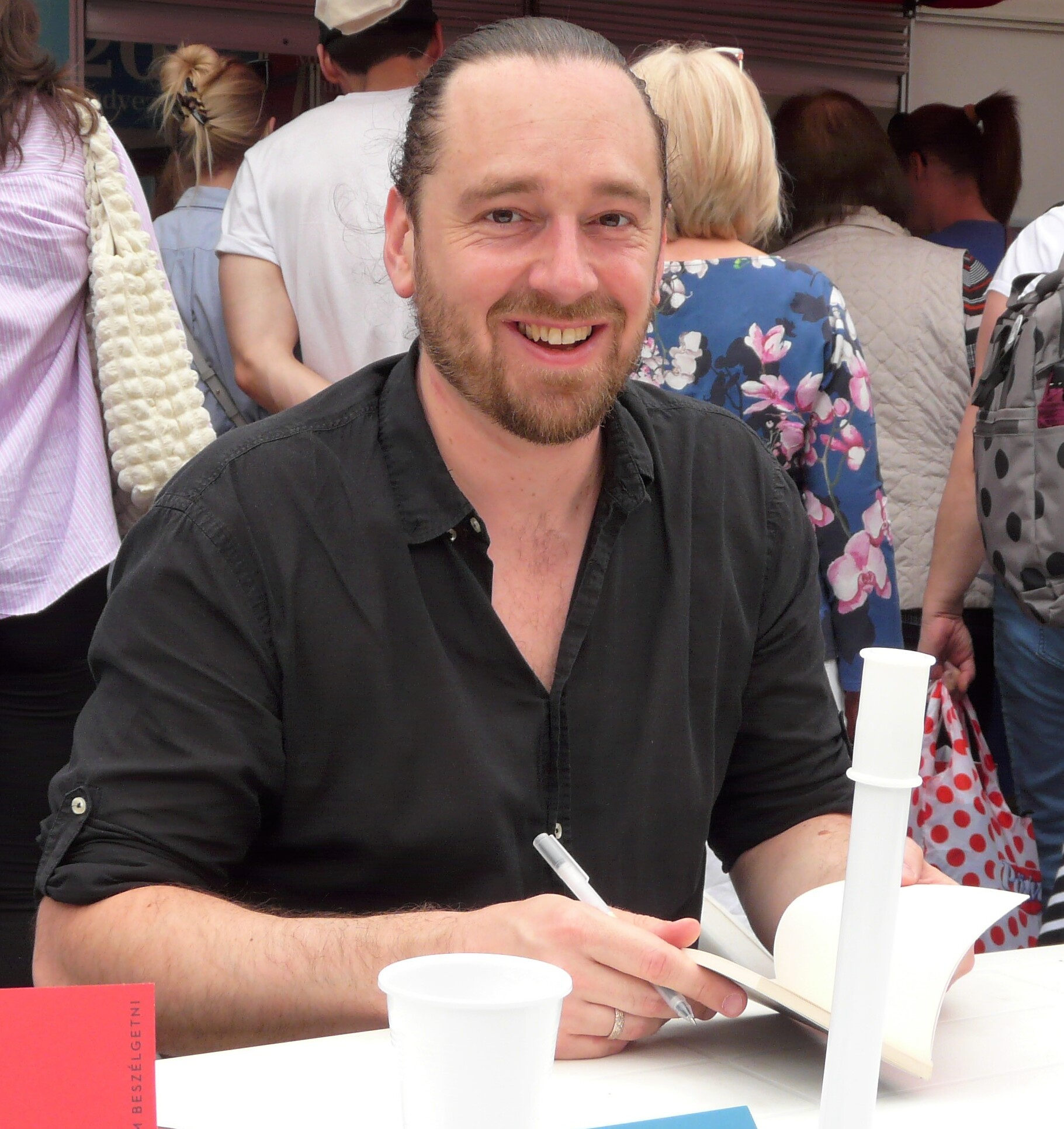
- Márton Simon in 2023
- Born: 14 April 1984 (age 42); Kalocsa, Hungary
- Education: Károli Gáspár University
- Occupations: Poet, translator, performer, slam poet
- Writing career
- Notable works: Dalok a magasföldszintről (2010); Polaroidok (2013); Rókák esküvője (2018)
- Website: simonmarton.com

Márton Simon (born 14 April 1984) is a Hungarian poet, translator, performer and slam poet.

== Biography ==
Márton Simon was born in Kalocsa on 14 April 1984. After graduating from the Reformed College of Pápa, he studied aesthetics and communication at the Pázmány Péter Catholic University in Budapest. In 2015, he graduated from Károli Gáspár University, where he majored in Oriental languages and cultures with a specialization in Japanese studies.

He started publishing poetry in 2004 in literary journals. His first volume of poetry, titled Dalok a magasföldszintről ("Songs from the Mezzanine"), was published in 2010. In 2021, the work was translated into English by Timea Sipos and released by The Offending Adam Press under the title Songs for 3:45AM. In 2012, he took second place at the 1st Hungarian Slam Poetry Championship.

Simon gained wider recognition after releasing his second poetry volume, Polaroidok ("Polaroids"), in 2013. The book, which contains very short, numbered texts, became a national bestseller and went through numerous reprints. This was followed up by the volumes Rókák esküvője ("Foxes' Wedding") in 2018 and Éjszaka a konyhában veled akartam beszélgetni ("I Wanted to Talk to You in the Kitchen at Night") in 2021.

He edited 99 magyar vers ("99 Hungarian Poems"), an anthology of Hungarian poetry, published in 2021 in the Helikon Zsebkönyvek series. In 2024, Simon left Jelenkor, his former publishing house, and founded Okapi Press, an independent publisher, under which his volume Hideg pizza ("Cold Pizza") was released.

Simon translates English and Japanese prose and poetry into Hungarian. His translations include works by Jennifer Egan (A Visit from the Goon Squad, Manhattan Beach) and Etgar Keret (The Seven Good Years).

== Works ==
- Dalok a magasföldszintről [Songs from the Mezzanine] (in Hungarian). Budapest: L'Harmattan. 2010. ISBN 9789632362632.
  - Songs for 3:45AM. Translated by Timea Sipos. The Offending Adam Press. 2021.
- Polaroidok [Polaroids] (in Hungarian). Budapest: Libri. 2013. ISBN 9789633101933.
- Rókák esküvője [Foxes' Wedding] (in Hungarian). Budapest: Jelenkor. 2018. ISBN 9789636766887.
- Éjszaka a konyhában veled akartam beszélgetni [I Wanted to Talk to You in the Kitchen at Night] (in Hungarian). Budapest: Jelenkor. 2021. ISBN 9789635181216.
- Hideg pizza [Cold Pizza] (in Hungarian). Budapest: Okapi Press. 2024. ISBN 9786150212272.

== Awards and honours ==
- Zsigmond Móricz Fellowship (2011)
- Péter Horváth Literary Fellowship (2018)
- Mihály Babits Literary Translation Fellowship (2018)
