= Torment Nexus =

Expression about cautionary science fiction inspiring real technology

The Torment Nexus is a metaphor coined by The Onion writer Alex Blechman for dystopian or allegorical elements in science fiction that technologists pursue as practical goals. The expression has since been used in discussions about the influence of science fiction on technological development.

Alex Blechman
(@AlexBlechman)
tweeted:

Sci-Fi Author: In my book I invented the Torment Nexus as a cautionary tale.

Tech Company: At long last, we have created the Torment Nexus from classic sci-fi novel Don't Create The Torment Nexus.

8 November 2021

== Overview ==
The term was coined in a 2021 tweet by The Onion staff writer Alex Blechman, shortly following Facebook's announcement that it would be rebranding to Meta Platforms as part of a shift in the company's focus towards developing a "metaverse", a term adopted from the novel Snow Crash.

Dais Johnston of Inverse has defined the Torment Nexus as "shorthand for something that backfired in fiction being unironically replicated in reality". Reviewing the 2023 CES trade show, Katie Wickens of PC Gamer defined the Torment Nexus as "a concept that encompasses our growing concern that science fiction will continue to become science fact across the consumer market, with the phobias wrought by technological speculation turning palpable in the hands of money-hungry corporations". In September 2025, MOSF Journal of Science Fiction editor Gabriel Burrow wrote that the term had become "a common joke within science fiction circles... The joke, of course, is that tech executives fail to engage with the critical aspect of science fiction—even when it's staring them in the face."

== Debates ==
=== Roles and responsibilities of science fiction in society ===
Robotic police dogs were prefigured in Ray Bradbury's novel Fahrenheit 451.

The term has been used in debates and commentary surrounding the role of science fiction in society. Sri Lankan SFF author Vajra Chandrasekera has stated that "as a scene, science fiction has to be able to fight those battles" concerning how the genre inspires technological development, saying that "you know the Torment Nexus meme? I love it, I enjoy it, but it also elides culpability in a way. It's like, 'oh, we were just warning you against it, we didn't mean to make it sound cool.' You kind of did, a little bit, mean to make it sound cool." In the 2024 Routledge Handbook of AI and Literature, Jo Lindsay Walton of the University of Sussex cited the term while discussing "critical design fiction", arguing that "perhaps science fiction can stimulate innovation, but cannot suppress it: like when you are told not to think of a pink elephant, and so you think of a pink elephant".

Writing for Writer's Digest in August 2025, American SFF author Tim Chawaga wrote that there was "a (partially self-imposed) expectation put upon the near-future science fiction writer, whose purview includes the climate conditions of this planet, they should really find some way to be useful. That they should conjure up some theoretical but realistic invention that will, on a planetary scale and in less than 300 pages, solve the Problem, i.e., the damage caused by climate change," but that many science fiction writers were "skeptical that technology alone can save us, or more specifically that their brilliant technology ideas will be used for the purpose of saving us. Today's grandest environmental tech proposals, like atmospheric aerosol sprays, carbon capture devices and credits, feel more like the downstream of a Ponzi scheme than a meaningfully scalable solution. And anything that science fiction has dreamt up that has been deemed worthy of churning out has often begun as a Torment Nexus."

American journalist and SFF writer Annalee Newitz has used the term to examine the responsibilities of readers of science fiction, arguing that there are "two main ways that people misread sci-fi". The first of these is the Torment Nexus, which "crops up when people read, watch or play a sci-fi story and focus on its futuristic tech without paying attention to the actual point of the story", with the second main way as "the Blueprint Problem... the mistaken idea that sci-fi provides an exact model for what is coming next and if we replicate what happens in sci-fi, we will arrive in a glorious future". According to Newitz, science fiction should not be read as "a map, a recipe book or a prescription", but instead as "a way of approaching problems with the underlying assumption that things don't have to be the way they are... If you want to build a better future, you cannot merely replicate something you read. You must imagine it yourself." Will Mason-Wilkes of the University of Birmingham has argued that the Torment Nexus arises when science fiction is engaged with through "'the art of the possible' mode, where science fiction provides a template for a technically achieved future rather than fueling a critical perspective on contemporary social ills."

=== Influence of science fiction on the tech industry ===
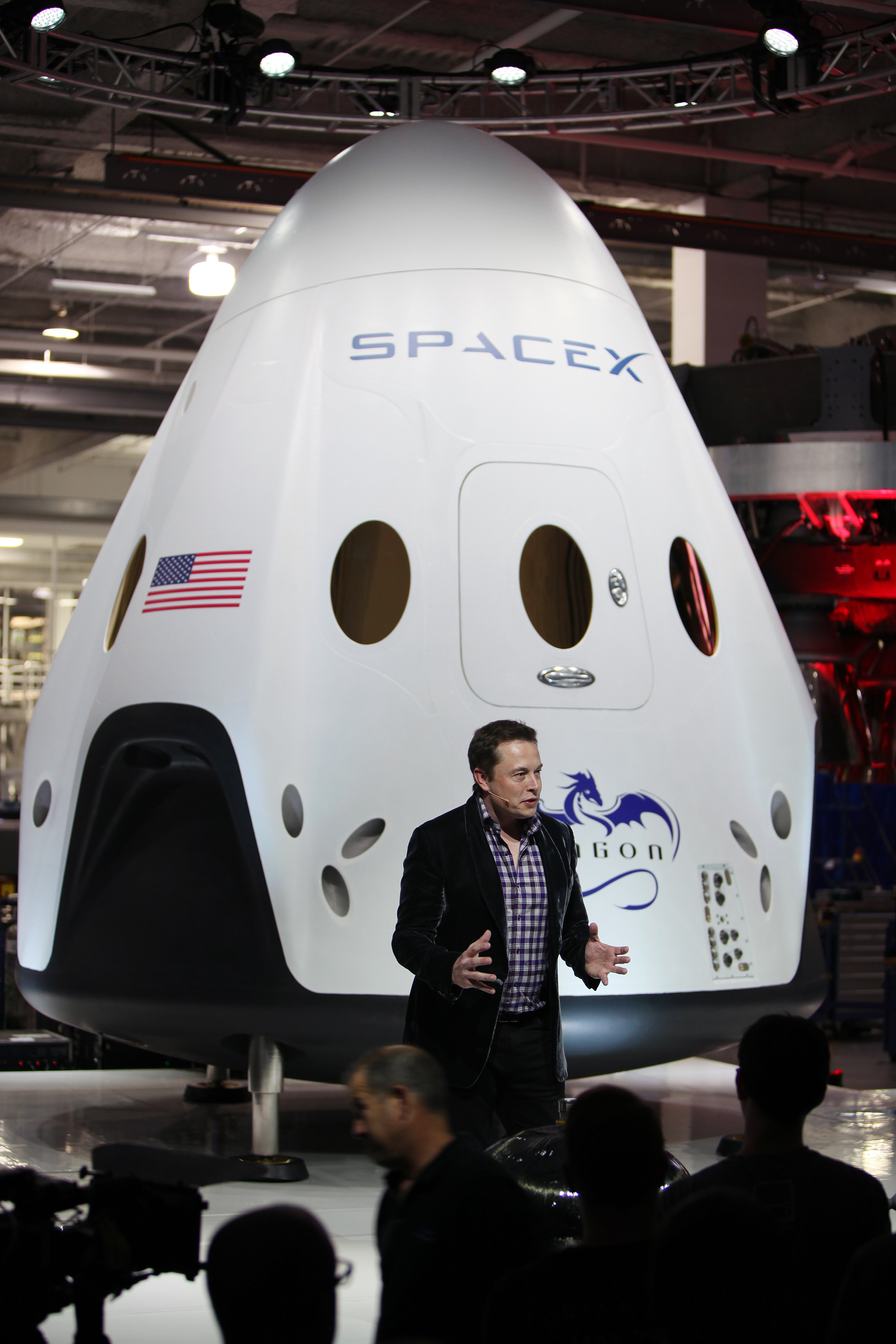
Elon Musk has cited The Hitchhiker's Guide to the Galaxy, which begins with the earth's destruction, as his philosophical inspiration.

The term has also been used in debates and commentary surrounding Silicon Valley and technological development. British author Charles Stross has written for Scientific American that the meme is "a worryingly accurate summary of the situation in Silicon Valley right now: the billionaires behind the steering wheel have mistaken cautionary tales and entertainments for a road map, and we're trapped in the passenger seat."

In his 2024 book Theses on the Metaphors of Digital-Textual History, British scholar Martin Paul Eve cited the term while describing how "simultaneously, we have a philosophy that is prevalent in Silicon Valley that apparently knows of the danger of AI overreach even while Silicon Valley's corporations pursue the apocalyptic endgame that they say they wish to avoid", saying that it was a form of "epistemological expansionism" where "there is something about the supposed irrepressible march of knowledge that drives such logic. Under such a rationale, inventions such as the nuclear bomb were always inevitable because it is always wrong not to seek to know more."

Picking up Stross's thread, Geoff Boucher and Emily McAvan have noted the particular influence of Iain Banks' Culture series among technological oligarchs, including Elon Musk, Jeff Bezos and Dario Amodei. Banks was an avowed socialist and the Culture series is mostly interpreted as a critique of neoliberal capitalism, couched in irony that leaves judgement to the reader. This irony allows the technological elite to repurpose Banks' work as an imaginary future against which they can justify their domineering conduct in the present. Technological determinism excludes the option of not building a Torment Nexus or superintelligence, leaving the question of how to guide anti-human forces toward the most benign outcome for humans, especially themselves.

In an October 2025 interview with writer Eliot Peper about the term, American journalist Ellen Huet wrote that "In Silicon Valley, it's incredibly common to find tech leaders who have drawn inspiration from the science fiction they read when they were younger... Peper says one of the reasons tech leaders are drawn to sci-fi so strongly in the first place is because it matches their desire to see the world as malleable."

In a 2024 paper in Dialogues in Human Geography, a group of researchers linked the term to the Longtermism prevalent among tech business owners, with Emma Fraser of the University of California, Berkeley saying that "their version of speculation is to invest in technologies that they believe will produce virtual worlds that are very much sci-fi imaginaries; while the material geography that they're generating is one in which, on one hand, engages in increasing extraction of resources, but also they're getting their own bolt holes for a future apocalypse... So all of the rich people will live somewhere physically comfortable, and everybody else who's basically destitute under climate change will still be able to consume VR and live in virtual worlds."

Historian Jill Lepore cites Blechman's tweet in the chapter "What Robots Want" of The Rise and Fall of the Artificial State as an example of science fiction being read literally, with cautionary tales reinterpreted by some technologists as guidebooks for building technologies that harm humanity.

=== Politics ===
Conservative American author Sohrab Ahmari has linked the threat of reckless, dystopic technology development to neoliberalism, arguing that Christian democracy should play a role in responding to the Torment Nexus.

[Catholic] doctrinal and education dicasteries warn of how AI could consolidate the power of a handful of corporations; rob workers of their skills and reduce them to even more rote tasks than many are assigned now; lead to massive job losses; and, ultimately, diminish the very notion of human intelligence and creativity... It won't suffice for the Christian to merely declaim that tech corporations should do this or that. They won't compromise in the face of moral exhortation or calls to goodwill, no matter how eloquent—not without countervailing pressure exerted by other associative bodies. In the teeth of the Torment Nexus, then, the Catholic task is to repair and reempower such bodies, starting with unions, and to stimulate long-atrophied muscles for Pope Leo's "unified action." We should also imagine new tripartite forms, such as AI ethics boards that place organized labor and civil society (including the Church) across the table from technologists.

— Sohrab Ahmari

Adrian Daub of Stanford University has linked the term to far-right politics in Silicon Valley and the Second Trump Administration, arguing that they both display an "identification with dystopia," including through far-right usage of the internet, and a "disidentification with power. One is a witness to one's own power rather than wielding it. One experiences power as an aesthetic effect."

=== Examples of a Torment Nexus ===
Newitz identified Peter Thiel's Palantir Technologies surveillance company (named after a 'seeing stone' from The Lord of the Rings) and Mark Zuckerberg's metaverse platform (with the term "metaverse" coined in the satirical and dystopian science fiction novel Snow Crash) as examples of a Torment Nexus. Lucas Ropek of Gizmodo identified a 2024 announcement by American science fiction writer Ernest Cline (that he would launch a metaverse platform) as an example of a Torment Nexus, saying that "the guy who wrote a book that arguably warned us about the dangers of getting lost in the metaverse is now busy creating one". Jack King of GQ identified British reality TV show Squid Game: The Challenge, based on the South Korean dystopian TV series Squid Game, as an example of a Torment Nexus, linking it to "the tendency of film studios and tech conglomerates to ignore the moral lesson of a given artwork if there's a buck to be made".

== See also ==
- List of existing technologies predicted in science fiction
- March of Intellect
- Science fiction studies
- Soylent (meal replacement)
