= RBMS =

RBMS may refer to:

- Rare Books and Manuscripts Section
- River Bend Middle School, Sterling, Virginia

Running Brushy Middle School
