= Laura Leiner =

Hungarian writer

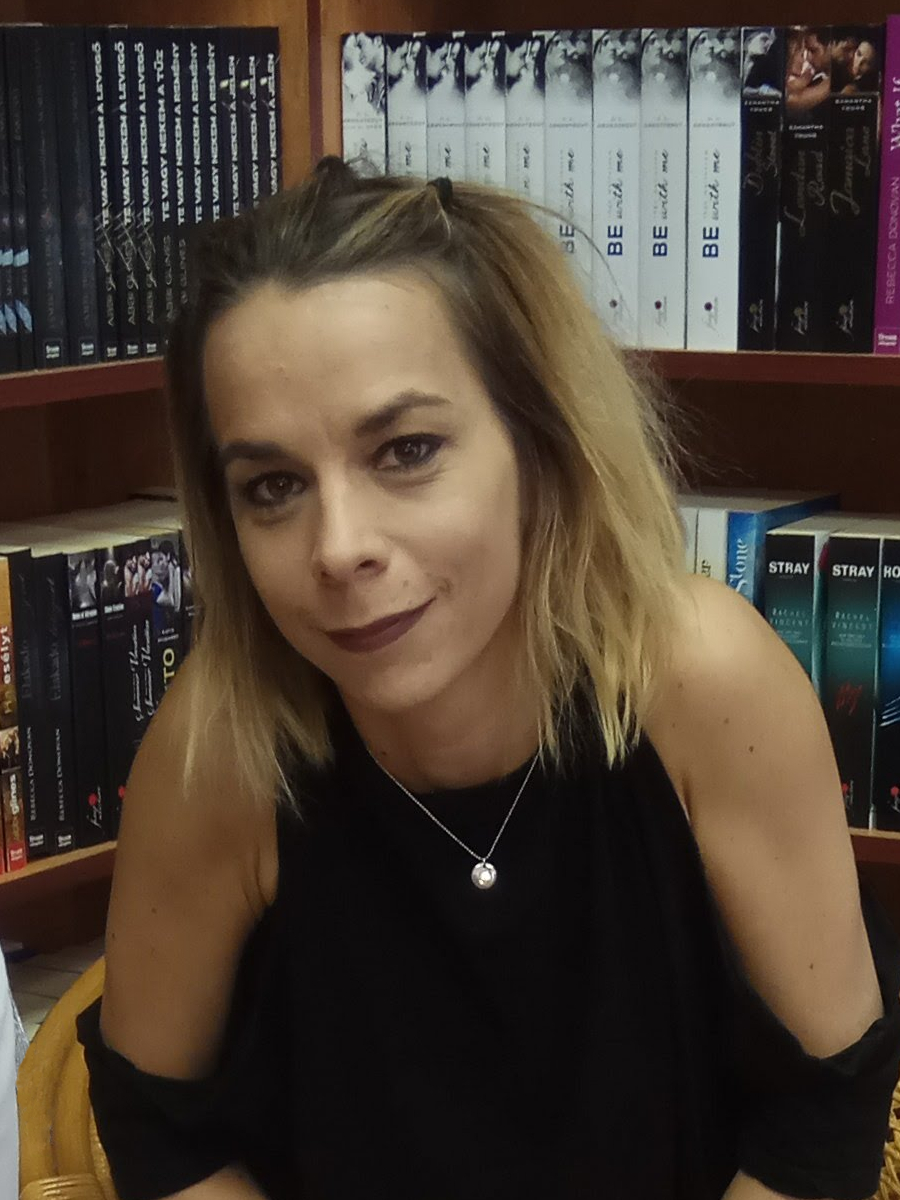
Laura Leiner

Laura Leiner (born 22 April 1985) is a Hungarian writer who made her publishing debut in 2005. Her most notable work is the series A Szent Johanna gimi (Joan of Arc High School), that she later clarified is fictitious and not based on her own life.

The first part of Szent Johanna Gimi was released at the Book Festival of Hungary in 2010. Two parts of the series were on the list of Libri's Gold Books in 2011 and one in 2010 She was the number one writer in Bookline's list of March 2012.

Her books are written from the point of view of her readers' age group. The series has a cult following in Hungary.

== Bibliography ==
- Remek! (Universal Hungary, 2005)
- Ez is Remek! (Universal Hungary, 2008)
- Közhelyek (Universal Hungary, 2008)
- Russel & Bee (Universal Hungary, 2008)
- Nyomból is megárt a sok (Universal Hungary, 2008)
- A Szent Johanna gimi 1. – Kezdet (Ciceró Könyvstúdió, 2010)
- A Szent Johanna gimi 2. – Együtt (Ciceró Könyvstúdió, 2010)
- A Szent Johanna gimi 3. – Egyedül (Ciceró Könyvstúdió, 2010)
- A Szent Johanna gimi 4. – Barátok (Ciceró Könyvstúdió, 2011)
- A Szent Johanna gimi 5. – Remény (Ciceró Könyvstúdió, 2011)
- A Szent Johanna gimi 6. – Ketten (Ciceró Könyvstúdió, 2012)
- A Szent Johanna gimi 7. – Útvesztő (Ciceró Könyvstúdió, 2012)
- A Szent Johanna gimi 8. - Örökké 8/1 (Ciceró Könyvstúdió, 2013)
- A Szent Johanna gimi 8. - Örökké 8/2 (Ciceró Könyvstúdió, 2013)
- A szent Johanna gimi - Kalauz (Ciceró Könyvstúdió, 2013)
- Bábel
- Akkor Szakítsunk
- Bexi 1.- Késtél
- Bexi 2.- Hullócsillag
- Bexi 3.- Illuzió
- Bexi 4.- Nélküled
- Bexi 5.- Valahol
- Bexi 6.- Egyszer
- Ég veled - Az Iskolák versenye (Trilogy 1)
- Maradj velem- Az Iskolák versenye (Trilogy 2)
- Emlékezz rám- Az Iskolák versenye (Trilogy 3)
- Mindig karácsony
- Bízz bennem-Az Iskolák versenye II. Trilógia 1
- Higgy nekem-Az Iskolák versenye II. Trilógia 2
- Állj mellém-Az Iskolák versenye II. Trilógia 3

== Awards ==
- A Szent Johanna gimi 1 – Kezdet Libri Aranykönyv 2010 – 7th place
- A Szent Johanna gimi 4 – Barátok Libri Aranykönyv 2011 – 5th place
- A Szent Johanna gimi 5 – Remény Libri Aranykönyv 2011 – 4th place
