= Who's Missing =

Who's Missing may refer to:

- Who's missing?, a children's game
- Who's Missing (album), a compilation album by The Who
