= Martin Paul Eve =

British academic and writer (born 1986)

Martin Paul Eve Ph.D., FEA
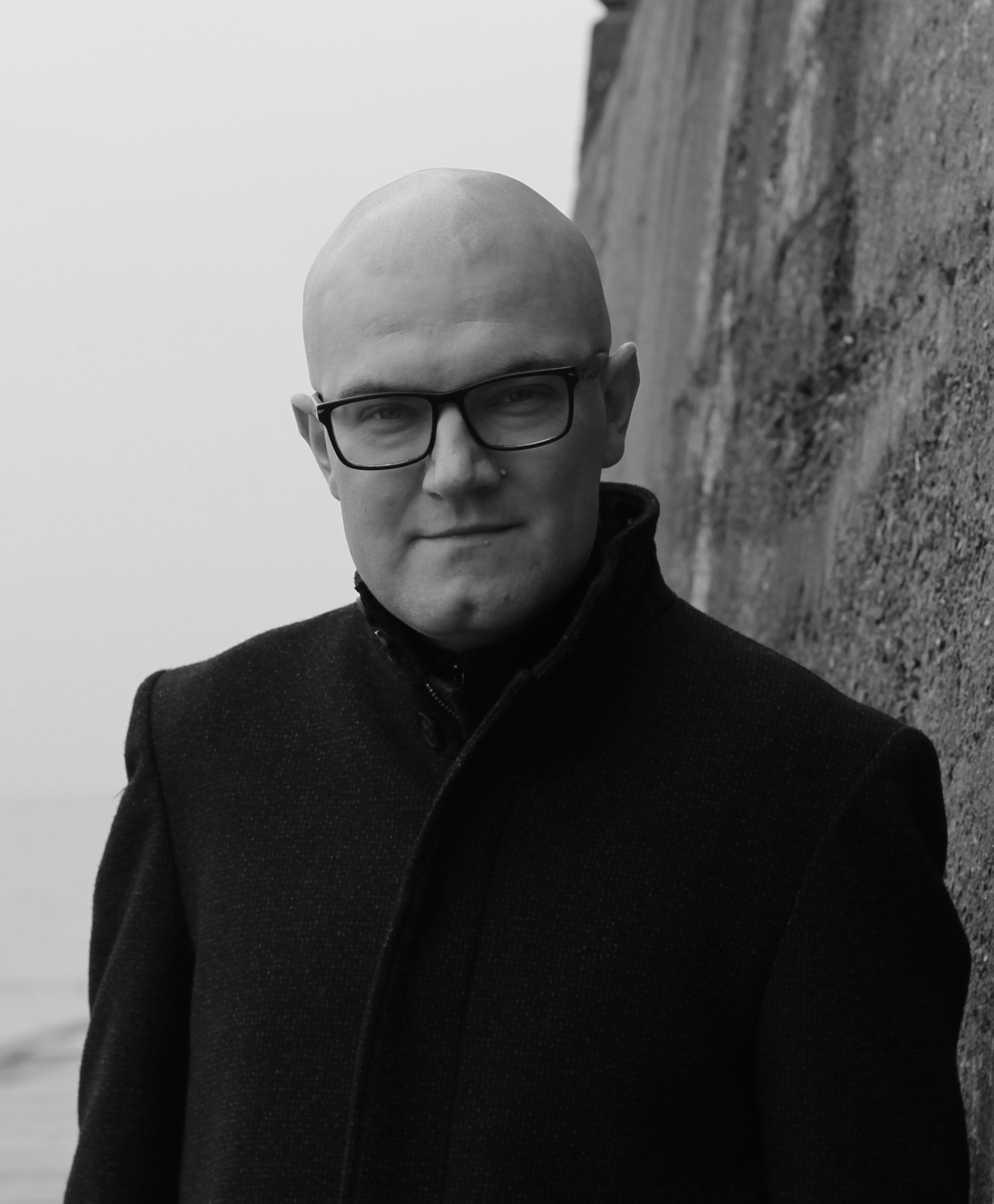
- Born: 26 May 1986 (age 40)
- Occupation: University Professor
- Known for: Co-founder of the Open Library of Humanities, open access policy, History of books, taxonomographic metafiction, digital humanities, the warez scene, research into Library Genesis, history of the PDF format
- Title: Professor of Literature, Technology and Publishing
- Awards: SHARP Book History Book Prize (2025) Association of University Presses StandUP Award (2024) Open Library of Humanities Award (2023) Canadian Social Knowledge Institute's Open Scholarship Award (2022) Shaw Trust List of 100 Most Influential People with Disabilities in the UK (2021) Association of Online Publishers Small Digital Publisher of the Year for The Open Library of Humanities (2020) Philip Leverhulme Prize (2019) Open Publishing Award for The Open Library of Humanities (2019) KU Leuven Medal of Honour in the Humanities and Social Sciences (2018) BACLS Edited Collection Award (shared) (2018) Guardian Higher Education Most Inspiring Leader (finalist) (2017) N. Katherine Hayles Award (shared) (2018) Westfield Trust Prize for Outstanding Academic Achievement (2008)

Academic background
- Education: Queen Mary, University of London; University of Sussex
- Thesis: Hostility or Tolerance? Philosophy, Polyphony and the Works of Thomas Pynchon (2013)
- Doctoral advisor: Peter Boxall, Derek Attridge

Academic work
- Discipline: Literary Studies, Digital Humanities, Library and Information Science
- Sub-discipline: Contemporary American fiction
- Institutions: Birkbeck, University of London, Crossref, Michigan State University, Sheffield Hallam University, University of Lincoln
- Main interests: Thomas Pynchon; metafiction; digital humanities; History of books; Open access policy
- Website: https://eve.gd/

Martin Paul Eve (born 1986) is a British academic, writer, computer programmer, and disability rights campaigner. He is the Professor of Literature, Technology and Publishing at Birkbeck College, University of London and the Technical Lead for Knowledge Commons at Michigan State University. Previously, Eve was Principal R&D Developer at Crossref from 2023-2024 and Visiting Professor of Digital Humanities at Sheffield Hallam University until 2022. He is known for his work on contemporary literary metafiction, computational approaches to the study of literature, digital media studies and history of the book, and open-access policy. Together with Caroline Edwards, he is co-founder of the Open Library of Humanities (OLH).

Eve was the recipient of a 2019 Philip Leverhulme Prize, the 2018 KU Leuven Medal of Honour in the Humanities and Social Sciences, a joint recipient of the Electronic Literature Organization's N. Katherine Hayles 2018 Prize for his chapter in The Bloomsbury Handbook of Electronic Literature, and in 2017 was a shortlisted finalist for The Guardian's Most Inspiring Leader in Higher Education award. In 2021 Eve was listed by the Shaw Trust as one of the 100 most influential people with disabilities in the United Kingdom. In 2025, Eve was awarded the SHARP Book History Book Prize.

Eve has severe rheumatoid arthritis and end-stage renal failure due to BK virus nephropathy.

== Academic work ==
Eve's academic work focuses on contemporary American and British fiction, textual scholarship, and digital approaches to the study of literature. Eve's earliest academic work focused on the novels of Thomas Pynchon, on whose writing his Ph.D. and first book focused. Eve is, though, especially well known for his work on David Mitchell and for uncovering and documenting the multiple textual editions of Cloud Atlas. Eve has also worked extensively on the American author Jennifer Egan, again uncovering substantial differences between the published version of her texts.

Following the work of Mark McGurl, part of Eve's ongoing project has been to chart the interactions between the academy and recent strains of fiction. With reference to the novels of Sarah Waters and China Miéville, for instance, Eve has termed this phenomenon "taxonomographic metafiction", which denotes "fiction about fiction that deals with the study/construction of genre/taxonomy". Eve's more recent literary studies work has turned to quantitative, computational, and digital-material approaches to the study of contemporary fiction, using approaches that have been praised for their rigour but simultaneously criticized for the amount of work that such methods require. Some of Eve's most recent work, published in Book History journal has explored the PDF format, demonstrating that Adobe's board of directors attempted to cancel its development, misunderstanding its conceptual importance.

Eve's work also covers the aesthetics and infrastructures of illicit underground digital cultures. His 2021 book, Warez, examines the pirate artefacts of the warez scene, arguing for the importance of understanding this culture's artforms. He has further written about the pirate e-book archive, Library Genesis, and its technical infrastructures for Digital Humanities Quarterly.

Eve is also known for his work studying academic cultures of evaluation. In his 2021 book, Reading Peer Review, Eve and his collaborators studied peer-review reports at the academic journal PLOS One. In this work, Eve et al. demonstrated that PLOS's attempts to shift reviewing cultures had not had the desired effect on the ground. Along with Jonathan Gray, Eve has also edited a volume on the global inequalities of scholarly communications.

== Open-access policy ==
Eve is known for and significantly involved in UK and international policy work on open access. In 2013, for instance, he gave oral and written evidence to the House of Commons of the United Kingdom's Department for Business, Innovation and Skills's Select Committee Inquiry into Open Access. Eve is also a member of the Universities UK Open Access Monographs Working Group and a Plan S Ambassador. Eve is also a co-investigator on the £2.2m Research England funded Community-led Open Publication Infrastructures for Monographs (COPIM), which aims to effect a transition of the UK's academic book publications to openly accessible modes. All of Eve's books are published open access and are free to download.

Eve is a founder and CEO of the Open Library of Humanities, a platform with an economic model that avoids author- or funder- facing charges and that is based on his previous theoretical writings. Originally funded by the Andrew W. Mellon Foundation, the platform is funded by a consortium of over 200 libraries and publishes 25 journals. In addition, the OLH funds journals from Liverpool University Press and the University of Wales Press to publish their titles without article processing charges.

== Disability rights work ==
Eve writes prominently on his blog about his health and disability. Eve has rheumatoid arthritis, vasculitis, secondary immunodeficiency, hearing loss, and has had pneumonia, sepsis, and a stroke. In 2017, Eve was part of a group that protested against the inaccessibility of a lecture by Judith Butler, who met with this group to discuss these provisions. For his advocacy work, in 2021 the Shaw Trust named Eve as one of the 100 most influential people with disabilities in the UK.

== Book publications ==
- Eve, Martin Paul (2014). Pynchon and Philosophy: Wittgenstein, Foucault and Adorno. Basingstoke; New York: Palgrave Macmillan. ISBN 978-1137405494.
- ——— (2014). Open Access and the Humanities: Contexts, Controversies and the Future. Cambridge: Cambridge University. doi:10.1017/CBO9781316161012. ISBN 9781316161012.
- ——— (2016). Password. Object Lessons. London: Bloomsbury. ISBN 978-1501314872.
- ——— (2016). Literature Against Criticism: University English & Contemporary Fiction in Conflict. Cambridge: Open Book. ISBN 978-1783742738.
- ——— (2019). Close Reading with Computers: Textual Scholarship, Computational Formalism, and David Mitchell's Cloud Atlas. Stanford, CA: Stanford University Press. ISBN 978-1503609365.
- ———; Gray, Jonathan, eds. (2020). Reassembling Scholarly Communications: Histories, Infrastructures, and Global Politics of Open Access. Cambridge, MA: MIT Press. ISBN 978-0262363723.
- ———; Neylon, Cameron; O’Donnell, Daniel; Moore, Samuel; Gadie, Robert; Odeniyi, Victoria; Parvin, Shahina (2021). Reading Peer Review: PLOS ONE and Institutional Change in Academia. Cambridge: Cambridge University Press. ISBN 978-1108742702.
- ——— (2021). Warez: The Infrastructure and Aesthetics of Piracy. Earth, Milky Way: punctum books. ISBN 978-1685710361.
- ——— (2022). The Digital Humanities and Literary Studies. Oxford: Oxford University Press. ISBN 978-0198850489.
- ——— (2024). Theses on the Metaphors of Digital-Textual History. Stanford, CA: Stanford University Press. ISBN 9781503639393. Open Access edition

== Awards ==
- 2025: SHARP Book History Book Prize
- 2024: Association of University Presses StandUP Award
- 2022: Canadian Social Knowledge Institute Open Scholarship Award
- 2021: Shaw Trust Disability Power 100
- 2020: Fellow of the English Association
- 2019: Philip Leverhulme Prize
- 2018: KU Leuven Medal of Honour in the Humanities and Social Sciences
- 2018: Electronic Literature Organization's N. Katherine Hayles 2018 Prize
- 2017: Guardian's Most Inspiring Leader in Higher Education Award (shortlisted)
