= Andrea Motley Crabtree =

First African American female diver in the Army

- Born: 25 February 1958 (age 68); Westchester, New York
- Military career
- Allegiance: United States
- Branch: United States Army

Andrea Motley Crabtree (born February 25, 1958) is a retired Master Sargent in the U.S Army, and the Army’s first female deep-sea diver and Black female deep-sea diver in any branch of service.

== Early life ==
Motley was born in Westchester County, New York, on February 25, 1958. She graduated high school in Mount Vernon, New York.

== Career ==
Crabtree served in the Army from 1977-1998. Four of those years were spent as a diver.

In the 1980s, some Army specialties that were previously only available to men opened to women. Among these was the diving specialty, and in 1982 Crabtree became the first woman in the Army to graduate from the Second Class Diver Course. In her class at the U.S. Navy Deep Sea Diving and Salvage School at Panama Beach, Florida, she was the only woman and only African-American student among eight Soldiers and more than 20 other students. The three-month program awarded the Corps of Engineers’ military occupational specialty 00B to soldiers, who would use their training to support underwater maintenance and construction projects. Crabtree followed Donna Tobias, who had become the first female diver in the U.S. Navy in 1975, and Carl Brashear, who was the first African American diver in the United States Navy as a Master Diver.

Diving students were required to pass a health and fitness assessment, as well as pass requirements such as rising from a seated position wearing the 198-pound dive suit, walking to a ladder, descending into the water and climbing back up. At the conclusion of training, Crabtree was one of only two soldiers and nine sailors to earn the diver badge. There were only approximately 39 divers in total in the Army at this time.

As a diver, she used the Mark V diving helmet and diving suit. Crabtree was initially stationed at Fort Belvoir, Virginia, for eight months, and later assigned as a diver in South Korea while in the Army. Eventually the diving specialty once again closed to female members of the Army, and in 1985 she finished her career as a signal soldier.

She is a member of Phi Theta Kappa.

== Legacy ==
Crabtree was consulted on deep sea diving by author Jennifer Egan for her novel "Manhattan Beach." She has been including in works by Immy Humes and is featured in the United States Army Women's Museum's "Be All You Can Be" exhibit.

Crabtree is also portrayed in Andrea Motley Crabtree, the first, a 2017 painting by Henry Taylor. This painting was based on a photograph taken in 1982. It is currently on display at the Metropolitan Museum of Art. It is held in Gallery 508, titled "Before Yesterday We Could Fly: An Afrofuturist Period Room" .

== Personal life ==
Crabtree has three sons.
