= Mroczek =

Mroczek is a Polish surname. Notable people with the surname include:

- Andrew Mroczek (born 1977), American artist and curator
- Czesław Mroczek (born 1964), Polish politician
- Eva Mroczek, Canadian scholar of ancient Judaism
- Marcin Mroczek (born 1982), Polish actor and dancer
