= Kathy Peiss =

American historian (born 1953)

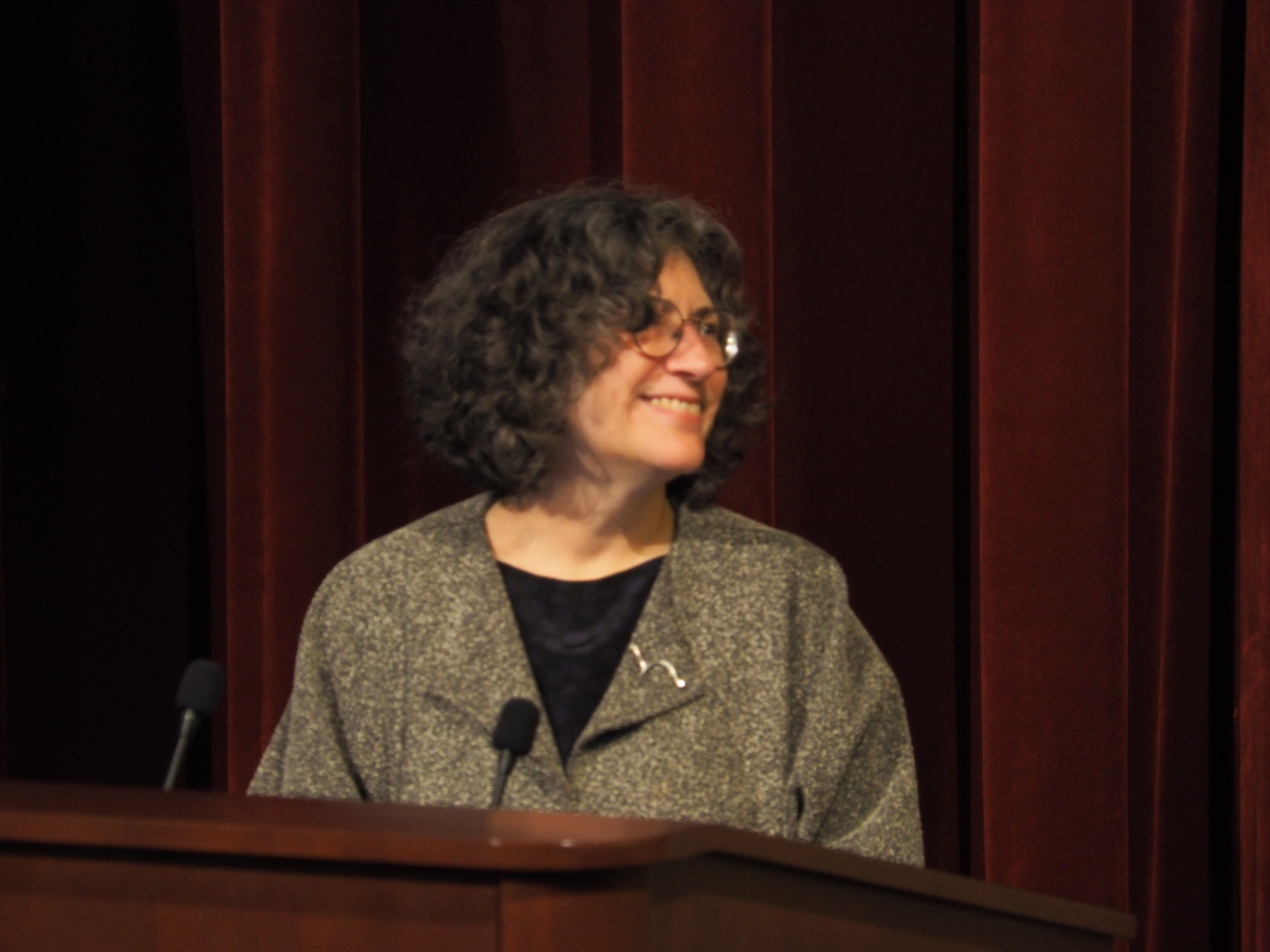

Kathy Lee Peiss (born 1953) is an American historian. She is the Roy F. and Jeannette P. Nichols Professor of American History at The University of Pennsylvania. She is a fellow of the Society of American Historians.

== Life ==
Peiss received her BA from Carleton College in 1975, and her PhD from Brown University in 1982. Her research focuses on the history women in the workplace, the history of American sexuality, and gender. She is the author of Cheap Amusements: Working Women and Leisure in Turn-of-the-Century New York and Hope in a Jar: The Making of American Beauty Culture, a finalist for the Los Angeles Times Book Award. Peiss was awarded a Guggenheim Fellowship in 2002.

Her 2021 book, Information Hunters: When Librarians, Soldiers, and Spies Banded Together in World War II Europe, received the Book History Prize from the Society for the History of Authorship, Reading and Publishing (SHARP).

== Work ==
- Information Hunters: When Librarians, Soldiers, and Spies Banded Together in World War II Europe. New York: Oxford University Press, 2020. ISBN 978-0190944612.
- Zoot Suit: The Enigmatic Career of an Extreme Style. Philadelphia: University of Pennsylvania, 2011. ISBN 978-0812223033.
- Major Problems in the History of American Sexuality: Documents and Essays. Boston: Houghton Mifflin Co., 2002. ISBN 978-0395903841.
- Hope in a Jar: The Making of American Beauty Culture. Philadelphia: University of Pennsylvania Press, 1998. ISBN 978-0812221671.
- Cheap Amusements: Working Women and Leisure in Turn-of-the-Century New York. Brown University, 1982. OCLC 10265094.
