= Black Box (short story) =

- Short story by Jennifer Egan
- First page of print publication in The New Yorker.
- Country: US
- Language: English
- Genre: Science fiction

Publication
- Published in: The New Yorker
- Publication date: 25 May 2012 (Twitter); 4 & 11 June 2012 (Magazine)

Chronology
A Visit from the Goon Squad	The Candy House

"Black Box" is a science fiction short story published in May 2012 by American writer Jennifer Egan. It was released in an unusual serialized format: as a series of tweets on The New Yorker's Twitter account over nine days beginning May 25, 2012. The story is in the form of "mental dispatches" from a spy living in the Mediterranean area in the near future.

"Black Box" appeared under the title "Lulu the Spy, 2032" in Egan's 2022 novel The Candy House.

== See also ==
- Twitterature

== Literary criticism ==
Below are literary critiques pertaining to Jennifer Egan's "Black Box":

- Fladager, Daniel (2020). "Jennifer Egan's Digital Archive: A Visit from the Goon Squad, Humanism, and the Digital Experience" (see section entitled "“Black Box” and the Digital Metafictional"). Lit: Literature Interpretation Theory. 31 (4): 313–327. doi:10.1080/10436928.2020.1840004. S2CID 230065601.
- Gutman, Jennifer (2020). "Cyborg Storytelling: Virtual Embodiment in Jennifer Egan's "Black Box"". Critique: Studies in Contemporary Fiction. 61 (3): 274–287. doi:10.1080/00111619.2020.1716679. hdl:1803/14216. S2CID 214202583.
- Newman, Daniel Aureliano (2018). "Your body is our black box: Narrating nations in second-person fiction by Edna O'Brien and Jennifer Egan". Frontiers of Narrative Studies. 4: 42–65. doi:10.1515/fns-2018-0004. S2CID 165497014.
- Precup, Amelia (2015). "The Posthuman Body in Jennifer Egan's "Black Box"". American, British and Canadian Studies Journal. 25: 171–186. doi:10.1515/abcsj-2015-0013. S2CID 194666699.
- Santini, Laura (2020). "Scenes of Vulnerability in You Narratives: Winterson's PowerBook and Egan's Black Box". Iperstoria (16). doi:10.13136/2281-4582/2020.i16.926.
