= The Literary Imagination in Jewish Antiquity =

2016 book by Eva Mroczek

- First edition
- Author: Eva Mroczek
- Language: English
- Genre: Non-fiction
- Publisher: Oxford University Press
- Publication date: 2016

The Literary Imagination in Jewish Antiquity is a monograph by Eva Mroczek, a scholar of ancient Judaism. Published by Oxford University Press in 2016, it argues that modern concepts of the Bible and even of the book itself—which refer to texts that are generally stable, finalized and/or definitive—are inapplicable to the Second Temple era of Judaism. The book suggests that scholars should avoid employing contemporary ideas of Authorship in their studies of early Jewish texts.
