= Theses on the Metaphors of Digital-Textual History =

2024 academic book by Martin Paul Eve

- Author: Martin Paul Eve
- Language: English
- Genre: Academic
- Publisher: Stanford University Press
- Publication date: July 2024
- Publication place: United States of America
- Media type: Print
- Pages: 436
- Awards: 2025 SHARP Book History Book Prize
- ISBN: 978-1-503-61488-8
- LC Class: 325.5.M47 E94 2024

Theses on the Metaphors of Digital-Textual History is a 2024 book by the British academic Martin Paul Eve. The book "calls attention to the digital-textual metaphors that condition our experience of digital space, and traces their history as they interact with physical cultures". The book was the winner of the 2025 SHARP Book History Book Prize.

== Summary ==
Broadly speaking, the book proposes seven "theses" for understanding digital metaphor:

- The virtual page almost never existed
- The history of digital whitespace is the seriality of musical silence
- Digital text is geopolitically structured
- Digital text is multidimesional
- Windows are allegories of political liberalism
- Libraries are assemblages of recombinable anxiety fragments
- Everything not saved will be lost

These range from the history of the colour of paper, through the disability politics of operating systems, and up to digital preservation.

== Impact and reception ==
Reception of the book has been mostly positive. Davide Pafumi of the University of Lethbridge, for example, situates the work amid the foundational questions of the discipline of digital humanities: "Eve’s Theses engages with questions that have been recognized but not fully resolved since the early foundational work in the field. Scholars like Frabetti (2012) stressed that “an understanding [of the digital] must be pursued through a close, even intimate, engagement with digitality and with software itself.” Yet, as Schreibman, Mandell, and Olsen (2011) argue, the problem remains that digital humanities and computer science have no readily available, mutually informed method of examining software practices".

Meanwhile, Shawna Ross at Texas A&M University worried that the nature of a work that proclaims "theses" "is to strike a decidedly ambivalent pose. It suggests the fearful responsibility of a theologian, philosopher, or mathematician tilting against tradition to establish a radical new school—yet tempers that ambition with a modesty regarding the completeness or cohesion of the work, which must be forgiven any gaps for the sake of its boldness". However, she went on to note that "Digital media specialists may find many of the component claims and historical touchstones familiar, but the book’s overarching narrative of obsolescing metaphors recontextualizes these elements into a compelling new whole that should be required reading for all doctoral candidates in literature". Alijan Ozkiral of New York University had a similar take, stating that "for any student or scholar looking to begin their studies into digital textuality, I recommend Theses on the Metaphors of Digital-Textual History", even though "the array of disciplines with which Eve’s book engages may seem overbroad".

The jurors for the 2025 SHARP Book History Book Prize, Hwisang Cho (Emory University), Kanupriya Dhingra (O. P. Jindal Global University), Abhijit Gupta (Jadavpur University), and Kinohi Nishikawa (Princeton University) wrote:

Theses on the Metaphors of the Digital-Textual History offers a set of brilliantly argued provocations that breaks new ground in digital book history by furnishing us with a set of methodological and metaphorical tools to understand the affordances and limitations of digital textualities. In seven linked essays, or theses, Martin Paul Eve seeks to revisit the digital-textual interface by radically enlarging the function of metaphor and language in understanding the materiality of the digital space. In so doing, he draws attention to the outward, planetary focus of recent material-textual studies, leading to productive discontinuities and fragmentation in the field.

Eve’s seven theses each deal with everyday aspects of our encounters with digital spaces and artifacts. The early theses examine the notion of the “virtual” and the “page” or “whitespace”: How does the idea of the codex page survive in the digital space? What is the relationship between the history of whiteness of paper and so-called digital whitespace? The third thesis deals with instances that highlight the geopolitics of digital text, such as the uneven histories of unicode and internet governance, while the fourth examines the spatial metaphors that inform the protocols of computer usage. The final theses are preoccupied with questions of libraries, storage, and data aggregation and constitute vigorous challenges to conventional understanding of and attitudes to the digital archive.
