= Look at Me (novel) =

2001 novel by Jennifer Egan

Look At Me
- Author: Jennifer Egan
- Language: English
- Genre: Novel
- Publisher: Nan A. Talese / Doubleday
- Publication date: 2001 (1st edition)
- Publication place: United States
- Media type: Print (hardcover)
- Pages: 432 pp (Hardcover edition)
- ISBN: 978-0-385-50276-4

Look At Me (2001, ISBN 978-0-385-50276-4) is a novel by American writer Jennifer Egan. It was a National Book Award Finalist. The novel was described in The New Yorker as "an energetic, unorthodox, quintessentially American vision of America," and in Kirkus Reviews as "a surprisingly satisfying stew of philosophy, social commentary, and storytelling."

The plot concerns several characters and weaves in and out of first and third person narratives, with the main character/narrator being Charlotte Swenson, who is attempting to revive her once-great career as a fashion model in New York City after a devastating car accident outside her hometown of Rockford, Illinois that resulted in reconstructive surgery to her face. Also explored are the lives of Michael West, a mysterious new math teacher in Rockford, Moose Metcalf, eccentric college professor and older brother of Charlotte's childhood friend Ellen, and Charlotte Hauser, Ellen's black-sheep teenage daughter.
