= Heads up, seven up =

American elementary school game

Heads up, seven up (sometimes called thumbs up, seven up, or heads down, or heads down thumbs up) is an American elementary school game in which a selection of players who are "up" must touch the head or thumb of the players who are "down". The players who were touched then must attempt to guess the identity of the player who touched them.

== Gameplay ==
To start the game, seven or another number of individuals are selected and come to the front of the room. The selected player says, "Heads down, thumbs up!" or "Heads down all around!" The participants who remain in their seats are to put their heads on the table/desk with their eyes closed and keep one thumb up. The chosen "seven up" children then circulate around the room, secretly pressing down one thumb each and then returning to the front of the room. A variation is simply tapping the person.

The selected player then calls, "Heads up, seven up!" or "Heads up, stand up!" All participants raise their heads and the participants whose thumbs were pressed stand up. Each in turn names the person they think pressed their thumb or tapped their head. If they guess correctly, the guesser takes the place of the person who pressed their thumb at the front of the classroom, and the person who pressed their thumb returns to their seat. If the person whose thumb was pressed guessed incorrectly, they sit down. The game then starts again.

Participants who guess later in the seven have an advantage, especially if one or more pickers have been eliminated. To make the game fair, the teacher can alternate the order in which the participants are called each time (such as from the front of the classroom to back, or left to right, or some other pattern).

== History ==
The origin of this elementary school game being played in American classrooms goes back to at least the 1950s, perhaps earlier.

== In media ==
Squid Game: The Challenge did an alternative version of Heads Up Seven Up, in episode 9 "Circle of Trust".

== See also ==
- Who's missing?
