= Squid Game: The Challenge =

British reality competition television series

- Promotional poster
- Also known as: Squid Game: The VIP Challenge (Season 3)
- Genre: Reality competition
- Based on: Squid Game by Hwang Dong-hyuk
- Country of origin: United Kingdom
- Original language: English
- No. of series: 2
- No. of episodes: 19

Production
- Executive producer: Stephen Lambert
- Running time: 40-59 minutes
- Production companies: Studio Lambert; The Garden

Original release
- Network: Netflix
- Release: 22 November 2023 – present

Squid Game: The Challenge is a British reality competition television series based on the South Korean dystopian survival thriller drama television series Squid Game. Both the first and second seasons featured 456 players competing for US$4.56 million (at the time, this was the largest cast and single cash prize in reality TV history).

The Netflix original was produced as a collaboration between independent television production companies Studio Lambert and the Garden, with Studio Lambert leading physical production in the UK. Season one's first five episodes were released on 22 November 2023, episodes 6–9 were released on 29 November, and episode 10, the season's finale, was released on 6 December. Season two's first four episodes were released on 4 November 2025, episodes 5–8 were released on 11 November and the season's finale, episode 9, was released on 18 November.

The show was No. 1 on Netflix's list of Top 10 English-language shows for the first two weeks after its release. It had 20.5 million views in its first week, 11.4 million in its second, and 6.6 million in its third, with a total of over 224 million hours watched within the first 21 days.

On 10 July 2025, the show was renewed for a third season. On 3 March 2026, Netflix announced that the third season, retitled Squid Game: The VIP Challenge, would feature 8 celebrity VIP players.

== Series overview ==
Series	Contestants	Episodes	Originally released		Winner
Series	Contestants	Episodes	First released	Last released	Winner
1	456	10	22 November 2023	6 December 2023	Mai Whelan (287)
2	456	9	4 November 2025	18 November 2025	Perla Figuereo (072)

== Season 1 ==
=== Episodes ===
The first five were released on 22 November 2023. Episodes 6–9 were released on 29 November, while episode 10, the finale, was released on 6 December.

No.	Title	Original release date
1	"Green Light, Red Light"	22 November 2023
456 players compete to win US$4.56 million (about £3.6 million), the largest cast and second largest cash prize in reality competition history. Players participate in eliminatory games and "tests". In the initial activity, multiple players were eliminated in the first two rounds by getting "shot" (dye packs in their uniforms). Then, in the game named "Red Light, Green Light", players had five minutes to cross the arena without getting caught by the robotic girl. 259 players were eliminated. In the "Decision test", while peeling carrots in between games, two players were given the option to eliminate one player. Prior to the "Dalgona" game, players were asked to stand in four lines. One player from each line was asked to agree on which groups (including themselves) would be assigned the four dalgona shapes (circle, triangle, star, and umbrella). When the four players could not come to an agreement in two minutes, they were eliminated. The following four could also not agree.
2	"The Man With the Umbrella"	22 November 2023
The last game continued in the second episode. The third set of four players were able to come to a decision. Players were then tasked to etch the shape in the Dalgona Candy with a needle. 69 players were eliminated in this game. In the "Phone test", between games, a phone was provided in the dormitory. One player picked up the phone and received a special treat of burger and fries. The second time the phone rang, the same player picked up the phone again and was told that, to avoid elimination, he would need to convince another player to pick up the phone as well.
3	"War"	22 November 2023
The episode starts by showing the "Phone test" player not succeeding in convincing another player to pick up the phone and being eliminated. In this episode's game, players were tasked to create eight evenly split teams. The teams then were faced off against another team to play the next game, a variant on Battleship. After identifying a captain and lieutenant, teams had to place boats on a game board and seat players in the boats. When all boats were placed, teams shot "rockets" at the other team's game board to sink the ships. The first team to sink two ships won the round. All players in sunk ships and the Captain and Lieutenant of the losing team were eliminated, while all other players (including players on the losing team in surviving boats) moved on. 45 players were eliminated.
4	"Nowhere to Hide"	22 November 2023
This was followed by the "Vote test", in which players were told that they each would place a vote for one person to be eliminated. Once a vote was cast against a player, they would be displayed on the screen. The top three receivers of votes were eliminated.
5	"Trick or Treat"	22 November 2023
In the "Jack-in-the-box test", five volunteers were provided with jack-in-the-boxes which included tasks for them to complete, to the effect of eliminating other players. In total, this test eliminated seven players.
6	"Goodbye"	29 November 2023
In the "Marbles" game, for completing a chore successfully in the designated time, players were treated with a picnic where they sat in pairs. Hidden in the baskets were marbles, and players were told that their opponents for the Marbles game would be the person with whom they had their picnic. A player who had no partner was selected to be safe through the round. 32 players were eliminated. The remaining players were tasked to decide on a captain, which they did. The "captain" was then informed that he alongside 19 others would move on to play in Game 5, and that the next test would be an "Allegiance test". He was told to select one ally from the group to advance alongside him. This selection set off a domino effect, where each chosen player picked another, creating a chain of allegiances. The test would conclude in the following episode.
7	"Friend and Foe"	29 November 2023
The episode begins with the conclusion of the Allegiance test. The eleven players not selected were eliminated. After this came "Glass Bridge", featuring a bridge containing seventeen pairs of glass tiles. Each pair had one safe tile and one unsafe tile. Players, each assigned a unique number from 1 to 20, crossed the bridge in sequence within 30 minutes. Wrong choices led to elimination. To add a layer of unpredictability to the game, players were instructed to select a teddy bear from a claw machine. Each bear was associated with a hidden specific number, which they then needed to assign to another player, establishing the sequence in which the contestants would participate in the game.
8	"One Step Closer"	29 November 2023
The episode begins with the conclusion of the Glass Bridge game, with twelve players remaining. In the "Die test", players took turns rolling dice. Before rolling, they nominated their own name or another player's. If a '6' was rolled, the nominated person was eliminated. The game stopped after three players were eliminated.
9	"Circle of Trust"	29 November 2023
In the penultimate episode, players were presented with an altered version of heads up, seven up. They were blindfolded and seated at desks in a circle with a gift box on a central podium. When tapped, a player would secretly remove their blindfold, pick up the gift box, place it on another player's desk, then replace their blindfold. All would remove their blindfolds and the player with the box would guess who placed it. Were they to guess correctly, the gifter would be eliminated; if not, they would be eliminated. Six players were eliminated in this way.
10	"One Lucky Day"	6 December 2023
In the "Button test", the three players were treated to a feast at a triangle-shaped table. A podium in the middle displayed three buttons. Each was to press a button. If it glowed green, that player would move on and choose another player to join them. If it glowed gray, nothing would happen. If it glowed red, the player would be eliminated. In the finals, the two players stood on the eyes of a squid-shaped grid. At the top and bottom of the grid were a safe and a box of keys. Both players drew a move in rock paper scissors. The winner selected a key from the box and tried to open the safe. If unsuccessful, the game continued. The player who picked a key and unlocked the safe would win. Mai (287) won the competition.

=== Game summary ===
Due to size constraints, this table only includes the top 20 contestants.

Color key:

WINNER The winner of Squid Game
RUNNER-UP The runner-up of Squid Game
WIN Successfully passed the game
RISK At risk of getting eliminated
OUT Eliminated from Squid Game via failing a game or test
OUT Eliminated from Squid Game via being voted out
LOSE Failed Game 3: Warships, but continued on in the competition
Elected Captain of their group in Game 3: Warships, or in the Allegiance test
Elected Lieutenant of their group in Game 3: Warships

Season 1 Contestant Episode Progress
Contestants		Episodes															
Number	Name	1	2		3		6		7		8			9		10	
Number	Name	1. Red Light, Green Light	2. Dalgona		3. Warships		4. Marbles		Allegiance Test	5. Glass Bridge		Die Test		6. Circle; of Trust		Button Test	7. Rock Paper; Scissors
287	Mai	WIN	Star	WIN	Group 2	LOSE	097: Jada	WIN	286: Chad	20 (by 182)	WIN	278 4	RISK	418, 429	WIN	Triangle	WINNER
451	Phill	WIN	Star	WIN	Group 7	LOSE	337: Bradford	WIN	278: Ashley	10 (by 418)	WIN	451 2		051, 278, 355	WIN		RUNNER-UP
016	Sam	WIN	Star	WIN	Group 5	RISK	344: Charlie	WIN	023: Siobhan	17 (by 286)	WIN	016 4			WIN	OUT	
355	Hallie	WIN	Circle	WIN	Group 8	LOSE	410: Demi	WIN	429: Elliott	18 (by 429)	WIN	355 2		019, 287	OUT		
278	Ashley	WIN	Circle	WIN	Group 3	WIN	229: Phalisia	WIN	016: Sam	05 (by 031)	WIN	RISK	287 5	451	OUT		
051	Rose Mary	WIN	Triangle	WIN	Group 3	RISK	080: Rachelle	WIN	221: Charles	12 (by 269)	WIN			451	OUT		
429	Elliott	WIN	Circle	WIN	Group 8	LOSE	427: Trudy	WIN	418: Roland	09 (by 016)	WIN	429 3		287	OUT		
019	Amanda	WIN	Circle	WIN	Group 6	WIN	336: Brian	WIN	393: Jackie	19 (by 023)	WIN	019 3		451	OUT		
418	Roland	WIN	Umbrella	WIN	Group 8	LOSE	202: Elliott	WIN	301: Trey	08 (by 451)	WIN	418 3		051	OUT		
286	Chad	WIN	Circle	WIN	Group 7	LOSE	334: Robert	WIN	254: Mikie	11	WIN	286 6	OUT				
031	Purna	WIN	Circle	WIN	Group 4	WIN	339: Rob	WIN	SAFE	06 (by 278)	WIN	031 6	OUT				
018	Bee	WIN	Circle	WIN	Group 6	WIN	361: Melissa	WIN	019: Amanda	16 (by 051)	WIN	018 6	OUT				
269	James	WIN	Circle	WIN	Group 4	WIN	312: Alexis	WIN	031: Purna	15 (by 301)	OUT						
254	Mikie	WIN	Triangle	WIN	Group 2	LOSE	087: Kyle	WIN	077: Marina	14 (by 355)	OUT						
023	Siobhan	WIN	Triangle	WIN	Group 5	RISK	054: Lucia	WIN	051: Rose Mary	13 (by 077)	OUT						
393	Jackie	WIN	Star	WIN	Group 6	WIN	382: Tim	WIN	451: Phill	07 (by 254)	OUT						
301	Trey	WIN	Circle	WIN	Group 5	WIN	302: LeAnn	WIN	269: James	03 (by 221)	OUT						
077	Marina	WIN	Circle	WIN	Group 5	WIN	083: Christian	WIN	018: Bee	04 (by 287)	OUT						
221	Charles	WIN	Star	WIN	Group 5	WIN	179: Chaney	WIN	355: Hallie	02 (by 019)	OUT						
182	TJ	WIN	Star	WIN	Group 5	WIN	183: Jesse	WIN	287: Mai	01 (by 393)	OUT						

== Season 2 ==
=== Episodes ===
Season 2 premiered as a three-week event; the episodes were released in batches with the first four episodes being released on 4 November 2025, episodes 5 through 8 were released on 11 November and the finale, episode 9, was released on 18 November.

No.	Title	Original release date
1	"Six Legs"	4 November 2025
After the 456 players arrive, the first game immediately begins. Two players, twins 431 and 432, volunteer as group leaders with half of the remaining assembling behind them. Their task is to press a buzzer exactly 456 seconds after a starting signal, or rather to count up to 456 seconds. The group closer to the number wins, the other is eliminated. The losing group's captain (431) receives the task to eliminate three players by saying their number and good luck to them, in order to stay in the game himself, which he does successfully. The players line up in rows of 10 which get split into two teams of five for a Six-Legged Pentathlon. They get their legs tied together and must solve five minigames while racing circle tracks: Ball in a Cup, Flying Stone, Gong-gi, House of Cards and Jegi. The team crossing the finish line first wins, the other gets eliminated.
2	"Catch"	4 November 2025
After the Pentathlon is concluded, the player slowest at each minigame respectively is announced (5 in total). The other players have to vote whether they shall be saved or not, and vote for elimination. During lunch, players may choose a lottery ticket instead. Some who do so receive treats, and two (024 and 352) a disadvantage for the next game. The players have to assort in four colour-marked areas which leaves out three players, who have to choose another player each to play for them. 082 chooses 383, 111 chooses 437, 118 chooses 152. In a sports court, the players have to stand on coloured lines, made up of dots, directed towards the middle of the room. From the middle, a thrower throws a ball to one player at front of a line. If the ball is caught, the thrower is saved and the catcher is the new thrower; if the ball is dropped onto the floor, both thrower and catcher are eliminated and a new ball is used. The disadvantaged players receive a smaller ball and a blindfold, respectively. By elimination of 152, 118 is eliminated, too.
3	"The Doll"	4 November 2025
Catch ends when all balls are used. All players still remaining in the game are saved. A Matryoshka doll is brought into the room. Once music starts, a player may take and open it to take out a smaller version. When the music plays again, he has to pass it on to another player who has to open it and take the smaller version, and so on until the last doll. 153 receives a disadvantage, 410 a treat, 075 the task to eliminate someone and chooses 080, 303 receives immunity for the next game, 098 receives the task to nominate someone for elimination and chooses 431.
4	"Mingle"	4 November 2025
The players have to vote between 098 and 431 whom to save and choose 098. During lunch, 021 receives a hint that the next game will be Mingle and the first number announced will be 6. For his disadvantage, 153 must choose another player (432), and they get tied together by the hands. The players have to stand on a revolving platform and, when the music stops, form groups in the size of an announced number in which they have to go into smaller chambers. Players who are not in a chamber or groups who are not of the correct size get eliminated. After several rounds, when the size number of 2 is announced, the players decide by themselves to stop the game by getting into pairs on the platform without going into the chambers. The pairs receive bags with marbles for the next game.
5	"Sacrifice"	11 November 2025
Each pair has to play a game of marbles to determine a winner between them, with the losers getting eliminated. In the dormitory, the players have to choose three hall monitors and pick 230, 327 and 410. As a privilege, they receive luxury bedding and breakfast. In another room with a black box, they have to nominate three players for elimination and pick 098, 437, and 417, which also have to go into a room with a black box. Simultaneously, each trio gets the chance to eliminate the other three and save two of their group if one sacrifices themself. The sacrifice that is placed into the black box faster counts.
6	"Ups and Downs"	11 November 2025
Player 230 sacrifices himself and places his number patch into the black box, eliminating players 098, 437, and 417, whilst saving players 327 and 410. A new hall monitor is chosen by the remaining hall monitors, in which they must eliminate one player in the boiler room, and they choose player 409. The players are then introduced to their next game, and the hall monitors split everyone up into teams of two, based on colours, in which they will the play the game in. 346 is left unpicked but may swap with a player and picks 398 who does not play in the game. The game is a variant of snakes and ladders: Teams must roll a dice and move forward those numbers of steps. There are ladders, which advance teams, and slides, each slide square having two where one leads to going back to a specific square, and the other to elimination. In addition, chance squares allow teams to randomly draw a card for either an advantage or disadvantage. Reaching square 42 will result in the team passing, and only 6 teams are able to pass.
7	"Trust"	11 November 2025
Ten players pass the game. When they enter the room for the next game, it is revealed that 398 is still in the game. All players have to sit in a circle of chairs and wear blindfolds. When one player is tapped on the shoulder, they have to take a gift box and place it on another player's table. The chosen player has to guess who gave it to them. If the guess is correct, the player who gave the box, is eliminated; if the guess is incorrect, the player who was given the box, is eliminated.
8	"Faith"	11 November 2025
Six players pass the Circle of Trust. For the game shuffleboard, they have to split in two groups of three and play against their own group. A line is put on the floor and each player receives a puck with their number they have to push across the floor close to the line. Crossing over the line would mean immediate elimination. Of each group the player farthest away from the line is put at risk of elimination; these two have to play another round against each other, which eliminates the loser. The five remaining players receive suits for the last supper.
9	"Red Light Green Light"	19 November 2025
During the feast, the players are shown a bowl containing five coins: four golden ones and a black one representing elimination. In an assigned order, the first player has to take the black and one golden coin, each concealed in one hand, and have the next player guess and take the coin from one hand. Which of the two then has the golden coin, is safe; which player has the black coin, has to take another golden coin and let the next player guess, until all players have a coin. Player 398 decides to sacrifice himself by letting the player before give him the black coin and then telling each next player which of his hands to guess. The last four players play "Red Light Green Light" where they have to cross an arena but not move while an electric doll watches them. Those who move then get eliminated. The player wins who either is the last not eliminated or reaches the end line first. Player 072 wins the last game and the season.

=== Game summary ===
Due to size constraints, this table only includes the top 18 contestants.

Color key:

WINNER The winner of Squid Game
RUNNER-UP The runner-up of Squid Game
WIN Successfully passed the game
RISK At risk of getting eliminated
OUT Eliminated from Squid Game via failing a game or test
OUT Eliminated from Squid Game via being voted out
Player selected as Dorm Monitor, chose teams for Game 5: Slides & Ladders

Season 2 Contestant Episode Progress
Contestants		Episodes																
Number	Name	1			2	3	4	5		6		7			8		9	
Number	Name	Count Test	1. Pentathalon		2. Catch		3. Mingle	4. Marbles		Monitor Test	5. Slides & Ladders		6. Circle; of Trust		7. Shuffleboard		Coin Test	8. Red Light, Green Light
072	Perla	Group X	Jegi	WIN	1st Ball	WIN	WIN	283: Jeffrey	WIN		Yellow	6th		WIN	WIN		Gold Coin	WINNER
302	Dajah	Group X	Flying Stone	WIN	1st Ball	WIN	WIN	134: Ajhia	WIN		Green	3rd		WIN	WIN		Gold Coin	RUNNER-UP
183	Steven	Group X	Jegi	WIN	4th Ball	WIN	WIN	232: Emily	WIN		Red	4th	361, 412	WIN	WIN		Gold Coin	OUT
017	Vanessa	Group X	Gonggi	WIN	1st Ball	WIN	WIN	405: Anlenie	WIN		Blue	1st		WIN	WIN		Gold Coin	OUT
398	Trinity	Group X	Flying Stone	WIN	1st Ball	WIN	WIN	181: Manel	WIN		PASS			WIN	RISK	WIN	Black Coin	
327	Kate	Group X	Card House	WIN	RISK	WIN	WIN	303: Chelly	WIN		Pink	5th	110	WIN	RISK	OUT		
412	AJ	Group X	Gonggi	WIN	1st Ball	WIN	WIN	021: Marcus	WIN		Pink	5th	409, 318, 398	OUT				
318	Christopher	Group X	Gonggi	WIN	3rd Ball	WIN	WIN	203: Tiffany	WIN		Blue	1st	327	OUT				
361	Faith	Group X	Card House	WIN	4th Ball	WIN	WIN	102: Emilie	WIN		Green	3rd	412	OUT				
409	Claire	Group X	Flying Stone	WIN	7th Ball	WIN	WIN	427: Julia	WIN	410	Purple	2nd	183	OUT				
110	Melissa	Group X	Card House	WIN	RISK	WIN	WIN	415: Eric	WIN		Purple	2nd	318	OUT				
451	Mackenzie	Group X	Jegi	WIN	4th Ball	WIN	WIN	408: Alexander	WIN		Aqua	OUT						
378	Justin	Group X	Flying Stone	WIN	3rd Ball	WIN	WIN	193: Lizzie	WIN		Orange	OUT						
383	Emily	Group X	Gonggi	WIN	3rd Ball	WIN	WIN	105: Jay	WIN		Orange	OUT						
369	Zoë	Group X	Card House	WIN	RISK	WIN	WIN	370: Curt	WIN		Yellow	OUT						
346	Drake	Group X	Gonggi	WIN	2nd Ball	WIN	WIN	125: Dimitri	WIN		Aqua	OUT						
402	Kevin	Group X	Flying Stone	WIN	4th Ball	WIN	WIN	086: Nicholas	WIN		Red	OUT						
410	Isaiah	Group X	Jegi	WIN	4th Ball	WIN	WIN	342: Darryl	WIN	OUT								

== Season 3: The VIP Challenge ==
Season 3, retitled Squid Game: The VIP Challenge, is confirmed, but no official release date has been announced. It will feature 8 celebrity VIP players.

The Celebrity players are Owning Manhattan's Ryan Serhant, NBA champion Tristan Thompson, Mel B of the Spice Girls, content creator Kristy Sarah, The Real Housewives of Atlanta's Kim Zolciak, Bachelor Nation's Hannah Godwin, television personality Dylan Efron, and Season 2 returnee – Player 152 Viper, who was selected by fans to return to the competition as the winner of the Second Chance Fan Vote.

== Production ==
In June 2022, it was announced that Netflix had given the production a series order.

=== Casting ===
Applications for the series opened in June 2022 with an announcement video released on YouTube. Netflix sought contestants from around the world but mandated that they must be English-speaking. The streaming service put out a final casting call in September 2022. Approximately 81,000 applied to be contestants.

With 456 real players, the series claims to have the largest cast in reality TV history. The most players are from the United States, are in their 20s, and are men.

=== Filming ===
Filming for the first season began in January 2023 across two studios in the UK, Cardington Studios in Bedford and on six giant sound stages in The Wharf Studios, Barking, London.

Reports emerged that ambulances had been called to treat real-life injuries sustained while filming the first season. Several players claimed in an interview that "Red Light, Green Light" had actually lasted for 7 hours, where players had to hold poses for up to 30 minutes. Netflix denied the severity of the reports, stating that the injuries were mild medical conditions and that they care about the health and safety of the cast and crew. The local ambulance service also stated it had not been called out to the studios. Britain's Health and Safety Executive evaluated the production after these complaints and found no actionable issues. Two unnamed players from the show threatened to sue Netflix after claiming that they had hypothermia during filming.

=== Game fairness and conditions ===
Four contestants of the first season of Squid Game: The Challenge made claims that the games were "rigged" and that filming conditions were poor. For example, for the game "Red Light, Green Light", players were forced to play in an unheated hangar for over nine hours, while medics tended to those who were unable to handle the low temperatures. In addition, in this game there were players who reached the finish line, but were still eliminated. One player also claimed to have seen another player who was eliminated but still able to rejoin the game.

== Reception ==
=== Viewership ===
In its release week (20–26 November 2023), Squid Game: The Challenge was the most-watched show globally on Netflix, with 85.7 million hours. It reached number one in 74 countries that same week, including the US and UK – and was Top 10 in a further 19 countries.

The series stayed at number one globally on Netflix into a second week (27 November – 3 December 2023), with 11.4 million views and 85 million hours watched. It was Top 10 in TV in 91 different countries that week. The reality competition series also boosted the original drama series Squid Game to number seven on the Non-English TV list with 1.5 million views that week.

In its third week post-release, Squid Game: The Challenge came in third place globally. It added 6.6 million views and 54.1 million hours viewed.

=== Critical response ===
The show received a mixed reception from critics and audiences. On Rotten Tomatoes, the series has an approval rating of 45% based on 44 reviews, with an average score of 5.8/10. The website's critics consensus reads: "The Challenge can be an addictive binge thanks to the sheer ingenuity of Squid Games' set pieces, but playing the original series' barbed satire completely straight gives this spinoff a soulless aftertaste." Metacritic gave a weighted average score of 52 out of 100 based on 22 critics reviews, indicating "mixed or average reviews".

Ryan Smith wrote in Newsweek, "Netflix's new spin-off of the thrilling Korean drama not only succeeds but triumphs in bringing to screens one of the most compelling TV competitions of the decade". In the Financial Times, Dan Einav proclaimed the "Netflix megahit becomes an irresistible reality show", while the Radio Times stated that Squid Game: The Challenge "not only lives up to the original, but with the new twists, challenges, and the real-life prize fund at stake, it's even more intense than the hit show". In Vulture, Nicholas Quah said "not only does Squid Game: The Challenge qualify as damn good reality television, it even serves as an unexpectedly effective adaptation of the original K-drama. The game show uses the language of modern reality television to realize, in its own strange way, the themes in Dong-hyuk's parable of capitalism grinding human beings into dust". Quah concluded "Squid Game: The Challenge isn't just a good reality show. It's a morally righteous one". Writing in The Guardian, critic Rebecca Nicholson said, "The real-life version of the Netflix drama is a grandiose, addictive spectacle that will have you shouting at your TV before the end of episode one." In The Telegraph, Jasper Rees said "the reality remake loses none of the tension or intrigue" of the drama, continuing "I…am agog to discover how ruthless the last dollar-driven survivors can be".

Some critics have suggested the unscripted version misses the point of the drama. The Hollywood Reporter called it "a brand extension that fundamentally misunderstands what the brand was meant to represent in the first place", continuing "you can take the anti-capitalism out of Squid Game – but capitalism will always find a way to rear its ugly head". Chase Hutchinson for Collider found it "shameless and opportunistic" and concluded "if the corrupt forces of capitalism could be made into a shambling corpse of television, it would look like Squid Game: The Challenge". Jack King of GQ identified Squid Game: The Challenge as an example of a Torment Nexus, linking it to "the tendency of film studios and tech conglomerates to ignore the moral lesson of a given artwork if there's a buck to be made".

== Accolades ==
Year	Award	Category	Nominee(s)	Result	Ref.
2024	Art Directors Guild Awards	Excellence in Production Design for a Variety, Reality, or Competition Series	Mathieu Weekes and Benjamin Norman (for "War")	Won	
2024	BPG Awards	Best Entertainment	Squid Game: The Challenge	Won	
2024	RTS Awards	Entertainment	Squid Game: The Challenge	Won	
2024	British Academy Television Awards	Best Reality	Squid Game: The Challenge	Won	
2024	People's Choice Awards	The Competition Show of the Year	Squid Game: The Challenge	Nominated	
2024	Producers Guild of America Awards	Outstanding Producer of Game & Competition Television	Squid Game: The Challenge	Nominated	
2024	Primetime Creative Arts Emmy Awards	Outstanding Casting for a Reality Program	Rachael Stubbins, Emma Shearer, Robyn Kass and Erika Dobrin	Nominated	
2024	Primetime Creative Arts Emmy Awards	Outstanding Directing for a Reality Program	Diccon Ramsay (for "Red Light, Green Light")	Nominated	
2024	Primetime Creative Arts Emmy Awards	Outstanding Production Design for a Variety, Reality or Competition Series	Mathieu Weekes, Ben Norman and Lizzie Chambers (for "War")	Nominated	
2025	Artios Awards	Outstanding Achievement in Casting – Reality Series (Competition)	Erika Dobrin, Robyn Kass, Christopher Burnley, Tony Miros	Nominated	

== See also ==
Similar shows

- Beast Games
- The Devil's Plan
- Physical: 100

Similar videos

- $456,000 Squid Game in Real Life! – 2021 video by MrBeast (James Donaldson)
