= The Candy House (novel) =

2022 novel by Jennifer Egan

- 2022 book jacket
- Author: Jennifer Egan
- Language: English
- Publisher: Scribner
- Publication date: April 5, 2022
- ISBN: 978-1476716763

The Candy House is a novel by Jennifer Egan, published by Scribner's with a U.S. release date of April 5, 2022.

== Background and context ==
This novel is a sequel to Egan's 2010 novel A Visit from the Goon Squad. Like that book, it consists of short, interrelated stories with recurring characters, set at different times. Many of the characters from A Visit from the Goon Squad appear in The Candy House, in addition to some of their children. For the most part, The Candy House takes place at a later time period and some of the stories include science-fiction themes.

== Stories ==
- "The Affinity Charm": Bix Bouton, CEO of the social media company Mandala, is longing for a new tech innovation. He overhears that experiments are being done to externalize the memories of animals, which sparks an idea.
- "Case Study: No One Got Hurt": Alfred Hollander is obsessed with authenticity. He performs outlandish acts to elicit genuine reactions from strangers, causing strife with his family.
- "A Journey: A Stranger Comes to Town": Miles Hollander considers his life to be a failure, and Drew struggles with guilt over Rob's death. Their lives change when they meet.
- "Rhyme Scheme": Lincoln works for Mandala as a "counter", someone who analyzes data from users to predict their behavior. He tries to figure out how to get coworker M to fall in love with him.
- "The Mystery of Our Mother": Melora Kline recounts the family history of her anthropologist mother and absent father Lou.
- "What the Forest Remembers": Charlene Kline uses Mandala to explore the memories of her father Lou on a trip in the 1960s.
- "Bright Day": Roxy Kline, a recovering heroin addict, uploads her memories to Mandala and is ready to start a new life.
- "'i,' the Protagonist": Chris Salazar works complacently for a company that "algebraizes" stories to basic tropes. On a frustrating trip with a coworker, he finds a new direction in life.
- "The Perimeter: After": Molly Cooke, a teenager, experience tensions with her friends when new girl Lulu arrives.
- "Lulu the Spy, 2032": Lulu Kisarian works as a spy for the Citizen Agent program. This story was first released in 2012 in serialized tweet format via The New Yorker's Twitter account under the title "Black Box".
- "The Perimeter: Before": Hannah, Molly's sister, recounts her mother's feud with their neighbor Jules Jones.
- "See Below": A series of intersecting email threads between the large cast of the novel's characters.
- "Eureka Gold": Gregory Bouton, Bix's son, mourns his father's death.
- "Middle Son (Area of Detail)": As a child, Ames Hollander hits a surprise game-winning home run in a baseball game. The story quickly recounts events of his future, then returns to the triumphant moment of his home run.

== Reception ==
Dwight Garner of The New York Times wrote:

Egan has a zonking sense of control; she knows where she's going and the polyphonic effects she wants to achieve, and she achieves them, as if she were writing on a type of MacBook that won't exist for another decade. The Candy House and Goon Squad are touchstone New York City and technology ... novels of our time; they'll be printed in one volume someday, I suspect, by the Library of America.

Kirkus Reviews said:

As she did in Goon Squad's PowerPoint chapter, Egan doles out information in small bites that accumulate to demonstrate the novel's time-honored strengths: richly complicated characters and compelling narratives ... [and the novel is a] thrilling, endlessly stimulating work that demands to be read and reread.

The novel was longlisted for the 2023 Andrew Carnegie Medal for Excellence in Fiction. Publishers Weekly named it one of the top ten works of fiction published in 2022. It was also selected for The New York Times's "10 Best Books of 2022" list.
