= Eva Mroczek =

American scholar

- Occupation: Scholar
- Employer: University of California, Davis
- Known for: The Literary Imagination in Jewish Antiquity

Academic background
- Education: University of Toronto (PhD)
- Website: religions.ucdavis.edu/people/eva-mroczek

Eva Mroczek is a Canadian scholar of ancient Judaism, in particular the texts of the Hebrew Bible, Dead Sea Scrolls, and Apocrypha, and Jewish readers' and writers' engagement with these texts. She is the author of The Literary Imagination in Jewish Antiquity (2016).

== Career ==
Mroczek is an associate professor of religious studies, director of the Jewish Studies program, and Chancellor's Fellow at the University of California, Davis. She earned her PhD at the University of Toronto, with a dissertation entitled Psalms Unbound: Ancient Concepts of Textual Tradition in 11QPsalms-a [a scroll of psalms from Qumran] and Related Texts, investigating early Jewish communities' conceptualizations of the production and collection of writing.

She was an assistant professor in Jewish studies and religious studies at Indiana University Bloomington before moving to University of California, Davis, and has also held fellowships at the Katz Center for Advanced Judaic Studies, University of Pennsylvania (2015) and the Frankel Center for Judaic Studies, University of Michigan (2016).

Her first monograph, The Literary Imagination in Jewish Antiquity, came out in 2016 with Oxford University Press. Her work on early Jewish literary culture has also appeared in the peer-reviewed Journal for the Study of Judaism, the Journal of Ancient Judaism, and Book History. In addition, Mroczek has a presence as a public intellectual, with a number of articles in venues aimed towards an interested public in the Society of Biblical Literature Bible Odyssey Website Showcase, Religion Dispatches, and the Los Angeles Review of Books Marginalia Online Journal. In 2019 Mroczek was awarded a $95,000 Frederick Burkhardt Residential Fellowship by the American Council of Learned Societies to undertake research at Huntington Library in the 2019/20 academic year.

== The Literary Imagination in Jewish Antiquity ==
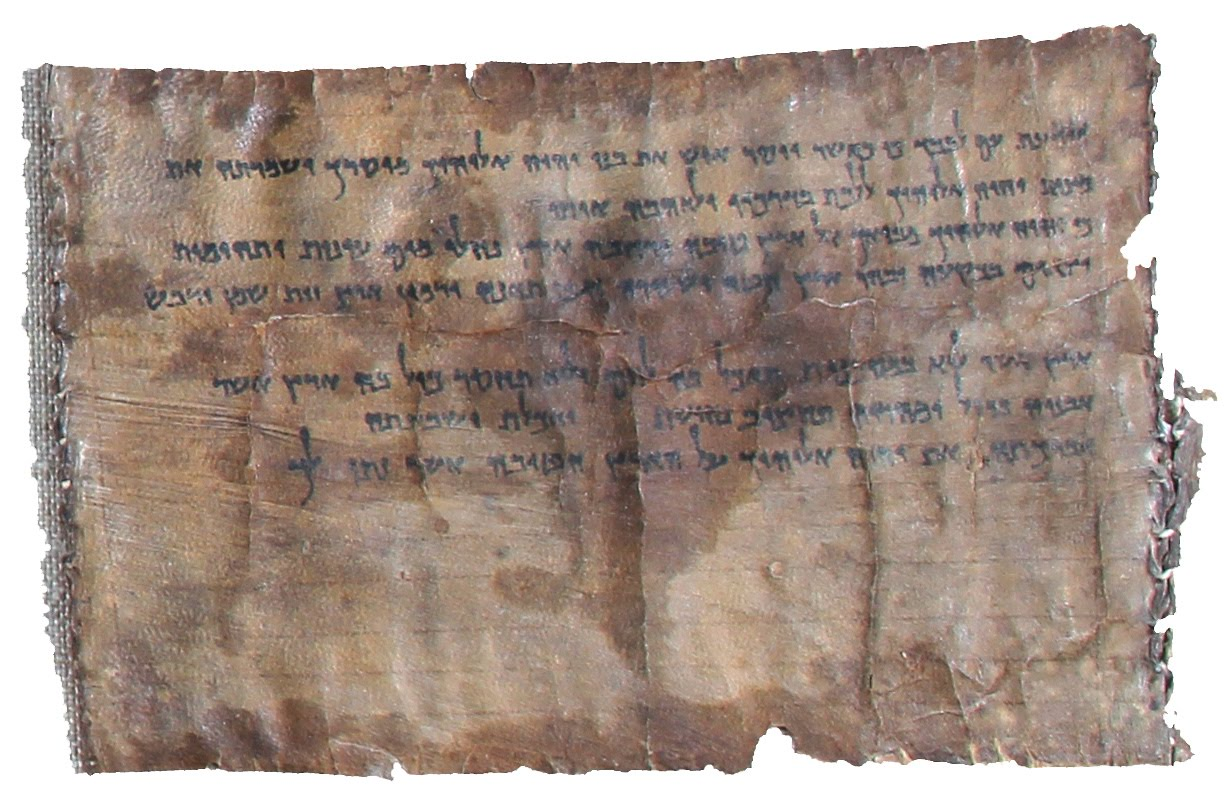
4Q41, one of the Dead Sea Scrolls.

Mroczek's first monograph, The Literary Imagination in Jewish Antiquity (Oxford University Press, 2016), argues that modern concepts of the Bible and even of the book itself—which refer to texts that are generally stable, finalized and/or definitive—are inapplicable to the Second Temple era of Judaism, and that scholars of early Jewish texts and of ancient texts more generally should avoid employing anachronistic contemporary ideas of books and authorship.

For this monograph, Mroczek won the 2017 Manfred Lautenschlaeger Award for Theological Promise and the 2017 George A. and Jean S. DeLong Book History Prize, and was a finalist for the Association for Jewish Studies' Jordan Schnitzer Book Awards. The book has been described as "field-changing", "offer[ing] challenging insights into rethinking the significance of the literary imagination in the world of sacred writing and memory not only in Jewish Antiquity but also in our reading of religious texts and biblical interpretation", presenting "a powerful new way of imagining early Jewish textuality", and "break[ing] new ground in her expositions of key texts, carving out space for genuinely new and better understandings of Second Temple literary culture and thus early Judaism... an important monograph, one that all scholars of antiquity should read... because of its successful balancing of theoretical critiques and practical advances, the work will prove insightful for scholars of religious studies generally".

== Selected bibliography ==
- Mroczek, Eva (2011). "Thinking Digitally About the Dead Sea Scrolls: Book History Before and Beyond the Book". Book History. 14 (1): 241–269. doi:10.1353/bh.2011.0006. ISSN 1529-1499. S2CID 162311388.
- Mroczek, Eva (2015). ""David did not ascend into the heavens" (Acts 2:34): Early Jewish Ascent Traditions and the Myth of Exegesis in the New Testament". Judaïsme Ancien. 3: 219–252. doi:10.1484/J.JAAJ.5.103822. ISSN 2294-9321.
- Mroczek, Eva (November 25, 2015). "How Not to Build a Temple: Jacob, David, and the Unbuilt Ideal in Ancient Judaism". Journal for the Study of Judaism. 46 (4–5): 512–546. doi:10.1163/15700631-12340108. ISSN 0047-2212.
- Mroczek, Eva (May 30, 2016). The Literary Imagination in Jewish Antiquity. Oxford University Press. doi:10.1093/acprof:oso/9780190279837.001.0001. ISBN 978-0-19-027983-7 – via Oxford Scholarship Online.
- Mroczek, Eva (January 23, 2017), "The End of the Psalms in the Dead Sea Scrolls, Greek Codices, and Syriac Manuscripts", in Lied, Liv Ingeborg; Lundhaug, Hugo (eds.), Snapshots of Evolving Traditions, Berlin, Boston: Walter de Gruyter, pp. 297–322, doi:10.1515/9783110348057-016, ISBN 978-3-11-034805-7
