= The Keep (Egan novel) =

2006 novel by Jennifer Egan

- Author: Jennifer Egan
- Language: English
- Genre: Novel
- Publisher: Alfred A. Knopf
- Publication date: 2006 (1st edition)
- Publication place: United States
- Media type: Print (hardcover)
- Pages: 239 pp (Hardcover edition)
- ISBN: 1-4000-4392-1

The Keep (2006, ISBN 1-4000-4392-1) is a novel by American writer Jennifer Egan. It became a National Bestseller, a New York Times and San Francisco Chronicle Notable Book, and a Chicago Tribune, Kansas City Star, and Rocky Mountain News Best Book of the Year. The Keep is a story about two cousins involved in a haunting business venture that evokes a horrifying tale from their past.

== Plot ==
Danny is an aging hipster in New York City who has fallen on hard times. He does not have a real career, and he has a habit of burning bridges with old friends. His cousin Howard presents him with an opportunity to come to Eastern Europe and help convert an old castle into an alternative resort. Danny has a troubled relationship with Howard. Many years before, when they were children, he cruelly left Howard stranded deep in a cave for days, traumatizing him badly, and ruining much of his childhood.

But Danny is desperate for money, so he decides to work for Howard and travels to the castle, severing his relationships with his New York world. He plunges himself into the strange environment of the castle and puts himself at the mercy of the cousin whom he betrayed many years before. It soon becomes clear that this castle is a deeply strange place with a dark history that is not entirely finished. It has secret passages, bizarre inhabitants, and seems to operate by different rules from the outside world. Danny, cut off from his familiar New York world, is unsure whether the castle is haunted or his own perceptions are becoming increasingly distorted. He thinks that his cousin may be out to get him and that the castle may be a giant trap.

When Danny attempts to escape from the castle, he encounters a series of mysterious roadblocks. No matter what he does, fate seems to be directing Danny back to the castle and towards a final confrontation with his cousin Howard. Together, they end up being trapped deep within the bowels of the castle, where they are forced to re-enact the traumas of childhood. Together, they must figure out a way to escape and survive.

== Characters ==
- Danny, the protagonist
- Howard/Howie, Danny's cousin
- Ann, Howard's wife
- Benjy, Howard and Ann's son
- Mick, Howard's right-hand man
- Nora, a student helper
- Martha, Danny's ex-girlfriend
- Steve, a hired helper and friend
- Baroness von Ausblinker, woman refusing to leave the family castle
- Ray, the man writing this story from jail
- Holly, writing teacher for the inmates
- Tom-Tom, Quince, Hamsam, Mel, Cherry, Allan Beard, Sanchez, inmates in the writing class
- Davis, Ray's cell mate

== Reception ==
In 2010, it was announced that a feature film adaptation of the novel was in development at CBS Films. Ehren Kruger wrote the screenplay and Niels Arden Oplev was hired to direct the film. The film production did not materialize.

== Sources ==
- Hoffert, Barbara. “Prepub Alert.” Review of The Keep, by Jennifer Egan. Library Journal Book Review, April 1, 2006.
