= Who's missing? =

Children's game

Who's missing? is a game for children ages kindergarten through 6th grade, and is often played in the classroom. In this game, one student hides his or her eyes while other children trade seats and one child from the group leaves the room. Alternatively, the person who is supposed to guess leaves the room while another child hides. Once everyone else is in a seat, the leader or teacher will say, "Turn around (or come back in) and see who's missing." The child will then try to figure out who's missing.

Rules may vary on how many guesses the child gets. After a specified amount of time, the teacher will tell the student who it is so the game is not delayed. The student who left the room is now the guesser, whether the first student guessed right or not, and a new round begins.

Other variations include having two or three students leave the room, especially towards the end of the game, and later having two or three students as guessers. As a prank, all the students could leave the room. Often those hiding their eyes will be surprised the first time it is done to the class.

== See also ==
- Hide-and-seek
- Heads up, seven up
