= Libri Publishing Hungary =

Hungarian publishing company

Libri Kiadó was founded in Budapest in August 2011 by Ákos Balogh, the owner of the Libri bookselling chain, Ádám Halmos, owner of the publishing house Nyitott Könyvműhely, and Bence Sárközy, former editor-in-chief of Magvető Kiadó.

Libri Publishing, led by Halmos and Sárkozy, publishes contemporary Hungarian writers as well as international titles in non-fiction, entertainment fiction and literary fiction, focusing on works of cultural and social importance. In 2012, Libri established an imprint for young adult and children's books called Kolibri Kiadó, and acquired a share in Helikon Kiadó, a 70-year-old prestigious publisher of authors such as Márai Sándor, Weöres Sándor, Bánffy Miklós and Alessandro Baricco.

Libri publishes foreign authors including Laurence Norfolk, Jennifer Egan, Don DeLillo, Julie Orringer, Erin Morgenstern, Isaac Marion, Darren Shan, Javier Marías, Jaume Cabré, Claudio Magris, Kader Abdolah, Anna Enquist, Kari Hotakainen, Mons Kallentoft, Alexander Soderberg, Virginie Despentes, Ryu Murakami; as well as non-fiction authors such as Siddhartha Mukherjee, Richard Dawkins and David Brooks. Among Hungarian writers, Libri publishes the most distinguished young poets such as Térey János and Závada Péter, as well as many of the leading young prose writers such as Benedek Szabolcs, Papp Sándor Zsigmond, Finy Petra, and Szabó Róbert Csaba.

Foreign rights to their Hungarian authors' books are represented by the Sárközy & Co. Literary Agency.
