= Manhattan Beach (novel) =

2017 novel by Jennifer Egan

- First edition cover
- Author: Jennifer Egan
- Language: English
- Genre: Historical fiction
- Publisher: Scribner
- Publication date: 2017
- Publication place: United States
- Media type: print, e-book
- Pages: 438 pp.
- ISBN: 978-1-4767-1673-2

Manhattan Beach is a historical novel by American writer Jennifer Egan. It was published, in 2017, by Scribner. The National Book Foundation listed the book, in their 2017 National Book Award Longlist, in the Fiction category. Time magazine selected it as one of its top ten novels of 2017.

== Plot ==
Eleven-going-on-twelve Anna Kerrigan and her father, Eddie, meet with gangster Dexter Styles, in late 1934, at the Styles mansion on the shore of Manhattan Beach in Brooklyn, New York City. Eddie is a former vaudeville performer who switched to become a stockbroker, during the Roaring Twenties, then was ruined, in the Great Depression. Now, he makes very little money, as a bagman in the criminal underworld, and he tells Styles he needs money to pay for a wheelchair for his brain-damaged and paralyzed daughter, Lydia, Anna's younger sister. Unknown to Anna, Eddie agrees to work for Styles, in his gambling operations. Anna puts her bare feet into the wintry cold seawater, at Manhattan Beach, to prove her toughness; this childish bravado makes a lasting impression on Styles.

At the age of 14, Anna loses her virginity with 16-year-old Leon, a boy from the neighborhood, meeting him, repeatedly, in their building's cellar. She keeps these trysts secret from her father, who disappears, one day, without a trace.

In 1942, at the age of 19, Anna is working at the Brooklyn Navy Yard to make warships for the US Navy in World War II. She has a repetitive job, measuring small metal parts with a micrometer. She also takes classes at Brooklyn College. One day, she sees a professional diver and starts training to be one. Against the wishes of diving officer Axel, she changes jobs, to start working on underwater repairs. She faces the difficulty of being the first woman diver at the Navy Yard.

At their modest Irish-heritage home, Anna supports the family, with her income. Anna's mother ignores her, to focus on Lydia's needs. Lydia's disability is much like cerebral palsy; she observes the world around her but cannot communicate.

Styles, who married into New York society and has risen as a crime boss, owns several nightclubs. Anna accompanies a coworker to one of the nightclubs, to meet the coworker's married lover. There, Anna is shocked to recognize Styles, who she sees as a link to her missing father. She recognizes him but does not wish to be known as a Kerrigan. She tries to conceal her identity from him, and she also tries to discover the fate of her father. As she probes him for information, they become attracted to one another. After a series of events that leaves him dead and Anna pregnant, Anna relocates to San Francisco, where she reconnects with her father.

== Development ==
The New Yorker interviewed Egan about the writing process. Egan said that the first draft of the book, written almost fifteen years prior, was "bad... absolutely unspeakable. But that's normal." She wrote a second draft, which she almost abandoned. When the book was finally finished, it was made up of almost 1,400 pages of handwritten manuscript. Over a year and a half, Egan had composed about five or six pages a day.

Egan wrote the story having her main character, Anna, become a professional diver. This was not historically accurate, as there were no women divers at Brooklyn Navy Yard, during World War II. Seeking accuracy in the fictional description, Egan met with Andrea Motley Crabtree, the first woman diver in the US Army. They talked about the physical challenge of wearing the standard 200-pound (91 kg) diving suit of the era, and Crabtree encouraged Egan to attend a diver's reunion, where she struggled into a US Army Mark V diving suit complete with heavy brass helmet and lead boots. Egan also met with Alfred Kolkin, an 86-year-old man who had worked at the Brooklyn Navy Yard as a machinist, during World War II.

== Reception ==
The Los Angeles Review of Books, comparing Egan's novel to A Tree Grows in Brooklyn, wrote that Manhattan Beach is one of the rare books by a woman author that captures the viewpoint of a woman of New York. Time wrote that Egan's "prose is exquisite" and that she gives the story "a cinematic feel, while grounding it in Anna's realistic frustrations with society." The New York Times wrote that Manhattan Beach "deserves to join the canon of New York stories."

Vulture reviewed the book negatively, saying that Egan "applies a surfeit of artifice," which obscures the intended historical authenticity of the military scenes, and that she relies too much on "clichés of cinema," in her gangster scenes, to obtain a "strained" result. Entertainment Weekly gave the work a B+ rating, observing that the writing was not cohesive, because it contained too many "Great American Novels" with the themes of "moody gangster noir; sweeping WWII romance; classic New York immigrants’ tale; timeless story of the sea."

In the UK, the Guardian wrote that Manhattan Beach was a "work of remarkable cinematic scope."

The academic reception of the novel, however, describes its lyrical style and emotional depth as a challenge to postmodern detachment, embracing the risk of criticism. It is portrayed as a calculated engagement with vulnerability, sentimentality, and historical fiction, employing disability as a narrative prosthesis to reflect systemic social collapse, particularly in the aftermath of 9/11. Ultimately, the work is presented as a deliberate act of ethical storytelling that transforms vulnerability into strength.
