= A Visit from the Goon Squad =

2010 book by Jennifer Egan

- Hardcover edition
- Author: Jennifer Egan
- Language: English
- Publisher: Knopf
- Publication date: June 8, 2010
- Publication place: United States
- Media type: Print (hardback & paperback)
- Pages: 288 pp.
- ISBN: 978-0-307-59283-5
- OCLC: 449844391
- LC Class: PS3555.G292 V57 2010
- Followed by: "Black Box"

A Visit from the Goon Squad is a 2010 novel by American author Jennifer Egan. It won the Pulitzer Prize for Fiction in 2011. The book is a set of thirteen interrelated stories with a large set of characters all connected to Bennie Salazar, a record company executive, and his assistant, Sasha. The book centers on the mostly self-destructive characters of different ages who, as they grow older, are sent in unforeseen, and sometimes unusual, directions by life. The stories shift back and forth in time from the 1970s to the present and into the near future. Many of the stories take place in and around New York City, although other settings include San Francisco, Italy, and Kenya.

In addition to winning the Pulitzer Prize, the book also won the National Book Critics Circle Award for fiction in 2010. The novel received mostly positive reviews from critics and later appeared in many lists of the best fiction works of the 2010s.

A sequel, The Candy House, was released in 2022.

== Collection or novel ==
Because of its unusual narrative structure, some critics have characterized the book as a novel and others as a collection of linked short stories. A Visit from the Goon Squad has 13 chapters, which can be read as individual stories and which do not focus on any single central character or narrative arc. Many were originally published as short stories in magazines such as the New Yorker and Harper's Magazine. In an interview with Salon.com's Laura Miller, Egan said she leaned toward calling the book a novel rather than a short story collection. She has also said that she considers the book to be neither a story collection nor a novel.

== Stories ==
- "Found Objects" – Sasha, a kleptomaniac, steals a woman's wallet while on a date with a man named Alex. She returns the wallet to its owner, who does not turn Sasha in. She later steals a note from Alex's wallet. Set at the time of publication, it is told in the third person from Sasha's perspective.
- "The Gold Cure" – One of the bands Bennie works with, the Stop/Go Sisters, performs their new songs for Bennie, Sasha, and Bennie's son Christopher. Bennie is divorced from Chris's mother and disconnected from Chris. He feels desire for Sasha, and after the performance, admits his love for her, but she turns him down. Set in the recent past, told in the third person from Bennie's perspective.
- "Ask Me If I Care" – In Bennie and his friend Scotty's teenage years, their band, The Flaming Dildos, scores a show at a punk club, thanks to a music producer named Lou, who is dating their friend Jocelyn. Scotty becomes the center of attention as the performance ends in a brawl. Bennie and Scotty's friendship ends as Alice, a band member who Bennie has a crush on, starts a relationship with Scotty. Set in 1979 in San Francisco, told by Rhea, a friend of Jocelyn and the band.
- "Safari" – Lou takes two of his children, Rolph and Charlene, along with his new girlfriend Mindy, on a wildlife-viewing safari in Kenya. One of the safari participants tries to photograph a lion up close, and the lion attacks him, but the tour guide, Albert, saves him by killing the lion. Rolph uncomprehendingly reveals the attraction between Mindy and Albert to his father, fueling his desire to marry her as a sort of win against Albert. Set in 1973, the story is told in the third person, mostly from Charlene's perspective.
- "You (Plural)" – Jocelyn and Rhea visit Lou on his deathbed. Jocelyn recalls having sex with Rolph and Rolph's suicide after she left Lou. Set about a decade in the past, told by Jocelyn.
- "X's and O's" – Scotty is now poor and apparently mentally ill but wants to make a comeback in music. He brings a big fish he caught in the East River to Bennie at his Sow's Ear Records office, where they have a tense conversation. Set a few years in the past, told by Scotty.
- "A to B" – Bennie is married to Stephanie, a publicist working for a woman named Dolly. Stephanie makes progress at fitting into their suburban neighborhood, especially by playing tennis with a female friend, but as Bennie increasingly resents their neighbors' prejudices, Stephanie starts hiding her tennis games. Her brother Jules, recently released from prison for assaulting the formerly famous starlet Kitty Jackson while interviewing her, begins living with her and Bennie. Stephanie is trapped by one of her deceptions into taking Jules to visit Bosco, a former rockstar with cancer who wants to go on a tour during which he plans to die. Bosco hires Jules to write about the tour. Set a few years in the past, told in the third person from Stephanie's perspective.
- "Selling the General" – Dolly is mostly out of business after she hosted a disastrous party and is desperate to provide for her daughter, Lulu. A murderous dictator has hired her to help soften his image. She enlists Kitty Jackson, who makes the PR project successful, reviving her career and Dolly's finances. Set in the present, told by Dolly.
- "Forty Minute Lunch: Kitty Jackson Opens Up About Love, Fame, and Nixon! Jules Jones Reports" – Jules interviews Kitty Jackson, as he has been hired to write a magazine article about her. However, as their lunch is drawing to a close, Jules convinces Kitty to go for a walk with him in Central Park, where he assaults her. Set a few years in the past, presented as a magazine article that Jules writes while in prison.
- "Out of Body" – Rob, an NYU student and Sasha's former "fake boyfriend" (her stepfather said he'd have her watched, so she wants to look normal) and Drew, now Sasha's boyfriend, spend a winter night partying with friends. Drew and Rob go for a swim in the East River, where Rob drowns. Set a decade or so in the past, told in the second person from Rob's perspective.
- "Good-bye, My Love" – Ted Hollander is in Naples, ostensibly looking for his niece Sasha, who disappeared two years before. However, Ted is using the all-expenses-paid trip as an excuse to visit museums and see art. Nevertheless he meets Sasha and helps her leave her life of theft and prostitution. Set about a decade and a half in the past, told in the third person from Ted's point of view.
- "Great Rock and Roll Pauses by Alison Blake" – Sasha and Drew's daughter Alison describes her family, including her brother Lincoln, who's obsessed with silences in rock songs. Set about 15 years in a future impacted by global warming, presented as a PowerPoint slide show made by Alison.
- "Pure Language" – Alex, an audio technician and the man who dated Sasha in the first story, is hired by Bennie to find 50 'parrots' – people paid to feign fandom – for Scotty's debut show. He keeps the job secret from his wife, and Lulu, now working for Bennie, talks him out of his ethical objections and talks Scotty into performing despite his last-minute refusal. Scotty's solo performance is incredibly memorable and well-received. Set about 15 years in the future, told from Alex's point of view in the third person.

== Characters ==
- Sasha: A kleptomaniac who runs away to Asia and then Naples as a teenager with a band, then studies at NYU after being found by her uncle and later becomes Bennie's assistant for 12 years. Marries late and moves to the Californian desert to raise her two kids, Lincoln and Alison.
- Bennie: Works as a record executive. Once a member of the "Flaming Dildos" band, with Scotty, Alice, Rhea, and Jocelyn. Later creates his own record label.
- Lou: A music producer and Bennie's mentor. Has many affairs, marriages, and children.
- Rolph: Lou's son, witnesses a lion attack on a safari in his childhood. Later commits suicide as a young adult.
- Charlene: One of Lou's daughters, and the older sister of Rolph. Goes by the nickname "Charlie".
- Scotty: A "magnetic" member of the Flaming Dildos as a teenager, continues on the margins of society in later life. Achieves musical success as an older man with the help of Bennie.
- Stephanie: Bennie's first wife. A member of a country club she resents, but where she enjoys playing tennis.
- Dolly: Publicist in pursuit of fame who loses her business after hosting a disastrous party. Eventually opens a cheese shop upstate. Lulu's mother.
- The General: Dictator of an unnamed tropical country accused of genocide. Hires Dolly as a publicist to mend his reputation.
- Lulu: Dolly's extraordinarily persuasive daughter; unsure of her father. Replaces Sasha as Bennie's assistant.
- Kitty: A hugely successful teen star who becomes jaded and harsh after Jules assaults her. Later does an ill-fated publicity job for Dolly and the General.
- Jules: Stephanie's older brother. A bi-polar celebrity journalist who goes to prison after assaulting Kitty in Central Park.
- Rob: Sasha's bisexual best friend in college, a former football player. Survives a suicide attempt but drowns while swimming with Drew a few months later.
- Bosco: A famous guitarist. Once a rockstar in The Conduits, later an overweight cancer survivor who plans to have a final tour on which he commits suicide.
- Alex: Went on a date and slept with Sasha in his twenties, later marries Rebecca and has a daughter Cara-Ann. Does a job for Bennie, secretly advertising Scotty's show.
- Rhea: Friend of Jocelyn, Scotty, and Bennie in her youth, harrowingly insecure and a member of the punk scene in San Francisco.
- Jocelyn: Had an affair with a middle-aged Lou while she was teenager. Later, as a recovering addict living with her mother, she visits Lou alongside Rhea as he is dying at his mansion.
- Drew: Sasha's boyfriend in college. Present with Rob in the river where Rob drowns. He and Sasha re-connect years later, get married, and move to the Californian desert to raise their two children. He works as a doctor.
- Ted: Sasha's uncle, who helped her during her parents' violent break-up. An Art History professor, he finds her while she is in Naples.
- Alison: Drew and Sasha's daughter, likes to make PowerPoint presentations.
- Lincoln: Drew and Sasha's son, who is "slightly autistic", and is obsessed with pauses in rock-and-roll songs.
- Alice: One of Bennie’s high school friends whom he had a crush on. Scotty married her, but they later divorced.

== Themes ==
"Goon squads" were originally groups of violent thugs sent to assault workers who tried to form labor unions. Later the term "goon" came to refer more generally to any violent thug, and this is where the book draws its central metaphor. In one story, a character named Bosco declares: "Time's a goon, right?", referring to the way that time and fate cruelly rob most of the book's characters of their youth, innocence, and success. As Bosco complains: "How did I go from being a rock star to being a fat fuck no one cares about?" Some of the book's characters do end up finding happiness, but it is always a limited happiness, and it is rarely in the form they sought. In an interview, Egan explained that "time is the stealth goon, the one you ignore because you are so busy worrying about the goons right in front of you."

Many of the book's characters work in the rock music business. Rock and roll, with its emphasis on youth culture, plays into the book's themes of aging and the loss of innocence. As Egan says, "my 9-year-old loves Lady Gaga and refers to Madonna as ‘old school’. There's no way to avoid becoming part of the past." Rock music was also central to the marketing push behind the book, although the actual text does not focus directly on musicians or music making. Egan said she knew rock and roll only as a consumer at the time she began writing the book and had to do a lot of research on the subject.

Egan said the story was inspired by two sources: Proust's In Search of Lost Time, and HBO's The Sopranos. It is a novel of memory and kinship, continuity, and disconnection.

== Reception ==
=== Honors ===
The novel won both the Pulitzer Prize for Fiction and the National Book Critics Circle Award for Fiction. The Pulitzer Prize Board noted that the novel was an "inventive investigation of growing up and growing old in the digital age, displaying a big-hearted curiosity about cultural change at warp speed".

=== Critical reception ===
In commenting on her Pulitzer, NPR critic Jonathan Bastian noted that "Egan is one of the most recent and successful examples of a trend that has been steadily seeping into the world of contemporary literature." The unusual format of the novel, taking place across multiple platforms, has led some critics to label the novel "post-postmodern". Many critics were impressed by Egan's experiments with structure, such as a section formatted like a PowerPoint printout.

In 2019, The Guardian ranked A Visit from the Goon Squad as the 24th best book since 2000. It was third place (along with Colson Whitehead’s The Underground Railroad) in a Literary Hub list of the best books of the 2010s, one of the 10 books in Time’s list of the best fiction works of the 2010s, and first place in Entertainment Weekly's list concerning the same period, with Leah Greenblatt calling it "a book as rich and resonant as any linear classic in the canon."

== Adaptation ==
Two days after the Pulitzer Prize announcement, it was announced that a deal with HBO for a television series adaptation had been signed. However, after two years the proposal had been dropped. In 2023, A24 announced that it had optioned the rights to the book and its sequel The Candy House for development into a television series with Olivia Wilde.
