= Rare Books and Manuscripts Section =

American Library Association organization

- Founded: 1958
- Formerly called: Committee on Rare Books, Manuscripts, and Special Collections

The Rare Books and Manuscripts Section (RBMS) is a section of the Association of College & Research Libraries (ACRL), a division of the American Library Association (ALA). The section is devoted to supporting the activities of special collections libraries and archives and promotes the interests of librarians, archivists, curators, and others concerned with the acquisition, organization, preservation, administration, and uses of special collections. The section also maintains ties with related organizations, such as the Society of American Archivists and the Antiquarian Booksellers' Association of America, sometimes participating in joint activities with them.

== History ==
The roots of RBMS go back to 1948, when an ACRL University Libraries Section meeting was devoted to the topic of rare books. In 1955, an ACRL Committee on Rare Books, Manuscripts, and Special Collections was formed

"to promote wider understanding of the value of rare books to scholarly research and to cultural growth, [and] bring improvement to the care, use and recognition of rare books in all libraries."

As part of a 1958 reorganization of ACRL, that committee formally became the present-day RBMS.

== Governance and organization ==
RBMS is governed by a seven-person executive committee consisting of a chair, vice chair/chair-elect, past chair, three at-large members, and a secretary, all of whom are elected by section plebiscite. "The chair of the section, the vice chair/chair-elect, and the past chair serve a one-year term. The vice chair/chair-elect automatically becomes chair of the section after a year as vice chair/chair-elect; and the chair of the section automatically becomes past chair after a year as chair. The secretary serves a two-year term. The members-at-large each serve a three-year term." Each member has one vote and meetings are governed by Robert's Rules of Order, which is used throughout ALA. The RBMS executive committee meets formally twice a year at ALA annual and midwinter meetings. Between formal meetings, business is conducted by other means, such as email and other electronic communications. The section has no paid staff and all work is on a volunteer basis.

RBMS is divided into a number of standing committees, ad hoc committees, task forces, and discussion groups, which also meet at the ALA annual and midwinter meetings. The fourteen standing committees are considered basically permanent. Ad hoc committees are given recurring tasks, such as the planning of annual conferences. Task forces are charged with specific duties, such as developing documents, and are normally discharged once their work is completed. Discussion groups are also basically permanent but have no appointed members outside the chair. All members of committees and task forces are appointed by the current chair. Appointed committee members normally serve two-year terms with the possibility of renewal for another two-year term. Finally, the chair appoints liaisons to both ACRL committees and outside affinity groups. All chairs and liaisons report directly to the executive committee.

== Programs and activities ==
RBMS maintains and supports a number of programs in fulfillment of its mission. The Section hosts an annual conference. The first conference (before 2015 called the preceonference) was held in 1959, and one has been held annually since 1961. Although traditionally limited to 250 participants, in recent years it has grown to accommodate expanding numbers. The conference, lasting for three days, consists of a mix of plenary sessions, seminar discussions, and outside activities, such as tours and visits to sites of interest. The section offers competitive scholarships for first-time attendees. Over the years, the conference has grown into one of the major rare book conferences in the United States and complements other conferences such as those of the Bibliographical Society of America, the Society of American Archivists, and the Society for the History of Authorship, Reading and Publishing.

RBMS also promulgates a number of guidelines that seek to describe best professional practices in the special collections field. As of 2012, the section had five such documents in print. Guidelines are reviewed and approved by ACRL, which is in reality the formal adopting body. Other documents, such as the RBMS Ethics Statement, are the section's sole responsibility. These documents are sometimes adopted by other bodies as professional statements. In 2009, the newly revised "Guidelines Regarding Security and Theft in Special Collections" were translated into Spanish, a first for an RBMS document.

Recognizing the importance of exhibitions to the work of special collections libraries, RBMS has administered since 1986 the Katharine Kyes Leab and Daniel J. Leab American Book Prices Current Exhibition Awards, given in five categories to outstanding printed and electronic exhibition catalogues produced by entities in the United States and Canada. Funds to support this award were donated by the Leabs.

Technically, RBMS has no print publications of its own; all items, including guidelines, are issued by ACRL. The two most prominent RBMS-sponsored publications are Your Old Books and RBM: A Journal of Rare Books, Manuscripts, and Cultural Heritage. The former is a guide developed by Peter VanWingen to assist average persons in determining if books in their possession might be rare or valuable. The original version has been revised and is available gratis either in hard copy or online. RBM, available in hard copy by subscription, is a formal academic journal that treats special collections topics and has been issued twice a year since 1986. Founded as Rare Books and Manuscript Librarianship, the title was changed to its present one in 2000. Except for the last three issues, some back files of the journal are available online. Finally, RBMS produced a semi-annual printed RBMS Newsletter, which began in 1984, eventually went to electronic only, and in 2010 was phased out entirely. All newsletter back-files are available, however, online.

The committee maintains a presence online through multiple media, including its own website where a large number of electronic publications can be found, a discussion list, Twitter feed, and Facebook pages.

== Membership ==
As of 2010, RBMS had approximately 1,800 members, making it the fourth largest ACRL section. Membership in RBMS is open to anyone who wishes to join, although memberships in both ALA and ACRL are required as prerequisites. A 1997 survey indicated that 96% of RBMS members are white and many are aging. The section actively recruits both new members (as reflected in its conference scholarship program) and a more diverse population (as indicated in its diversity statement).

== See also ==
- Books in the United States
