= Society for the History of Authorship, Reading and Publishing =

Membership society for scholars

Society for the History of Authorship, Reading and Publishing (SHARP)
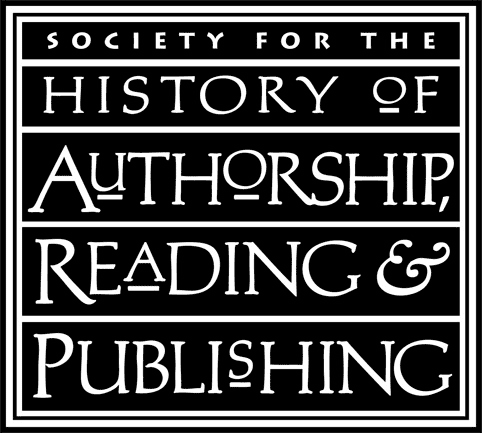
- Abbreviation: SHARP
- Formation: 1992
- President: Danielle Fuller
- Publication: Book History, Lingua Franca, SHARP News
- Website: https://sharpweb.org/

The Society for the History of Authorship, Reading and Publishing (SHARP) formed in 1991 in the United States on the initiative of scholars Jonathan Rose, Simon Eliot, and others.

A major conference was held was at the Center for the Book at the Library of Congress, July 14-16, 1994, where Center Director, John Y. Cole served as chair of the planning committee. Over two hundred book historians attended, and eighty-two papers were presented.

Its members study the history of books and the "composition, mediation, reception, survival, and transformation of written communication." The group maintains an electronic discussion list (SHARP-L), produces several academic journals, and holds annual meetings. Membership consists mostly of British and American scholars.

== SHARP Book History Prize ==
The SHARP Book History Book Prize recognizes the best book published on any aspect of the creation, dissemination, or uses of script or print.

- 2025. Martin Paul Eve. Theses on the Metaphors of Digital-Textual History. (Stanford University Press, 2024).
- 2024. Sebouh David Aslanian, Early Modernity and Mobility: Port Cities and Printers across the Armenian Diaspora, 1512–1800 (Yale University Press, 2023).
- 2023. Kirsten Silva Gruesz, Cotton Mather's Spanish Lessons: A Story of Language, Race, and Belonging in the Early Americas (Harvard University Press, 2022), and Michelle R. Warren, Holy Digital Grail: A Medieval Book on the Internet (Stanford University Press, 2022).
- 2022. Elizabeth McHenry, To Make Negro Literature: Writing, Literary Practice, and African American Authorship (Duke University Press, 2021).
- 2021. Kathy Peiss, Information Hunters: When Librarians, Soldiers, and Spies Banded Together in World War II Europe (Oxford University Press, 2020)
- 2020. Jeffrey T. Zalar, Reading and Rebellion in Catholic Germany, 1770–1914 (Cambridge University Press, 2019).
- 2019. Brent Nongbri, God's Library: The Archaeology of the Earliest Christian Manuscripts (Yale University Press, 2018).
- 2018. Eric Marshall White, Editio Princeps: A History of the Gutenberg Bible (Brepols, 2017).

== SHARP Journals ==
SHARP runs three publications.

=== Book history ===
Book History
- Subject: History
- Language: English
- Edited by: Greg Barnhisel, Duquesne University | Yuri Cowan, Norwegian University of Science and Technology | Alexandra Dane, University of Melbourne

Publication details
- History: 1998–present
- Publisher: Johns Hopkins University Press for the Society for the History of Authorship, Reading and Publishing (United States)
- Frequency: Annual

Standard abbreviations
- ISO 4: Book Hist.

Indexing
- ISSN: 1098-7371 (print); 1529-1499 (web)
- OCLC no.: 42631160

Links
- Journal homepage; Online access

Book History is an academic journal devoted to the history of the book, i.e. the history of the creation, dissemination, and reception of script and printed materials. It publishes research on the social, economic, and cultural history of authorship, editing, printing, the book arts, publishing and the book trade, periodicals, newspapers, ephemera, copyright, censorship, literary agents, libraries, literary criticism, canon formation, literacy, literary education, reading habits, and reader response.

Digital materials referenced in and supplementary to articles appearing in Book History are shared on the website Book History Unbound.

=== Lingua Franca ===
Lingua Franca is an annual electronic journal devoted to the best international research on book history, translated into English. It addresses all aspects of book history, including the composition, mediation, reception, survival, and transformation of written communication in material forms from marks on stone to new media. Perspectives range from the individual reader to the transnational communication network. Lingua Franca translates and publishes both new work and work which has already appeared in languages other than English.

=== SHARP News ===
SHARP News is SHARP's free, online newsletter publishing reviews of books, conferences and exhibitions, as well as bibliographies, pedagogical materials, interviews with emerging scholars, and announcements of interest to SHARP members.

SHARP News publishes a series of bibliographies. Annual Bibliographies have been published since 2017, most recently in 2024. SHARP News also publishes biannual bibliographies of theses and dissertations. More recently, they also started to publish thematic bibliographies. Themes in the past have included:

- LGBTQIA+ book history
- book history and disability studies
- the history of paper
- local bibliographies of works about
  - Africa
  - India and South Asia
  - South America

== See also ==
- Similar organizations:
  - American Library Association. Rare Books and Manuscripts Section
  - Bibliographical Society, UK
  - Bibliographical Society of America
  - Printing Historical Society, UK
  - American Printing History Association
