= Jennifer Egan =

Novelist, short story writer

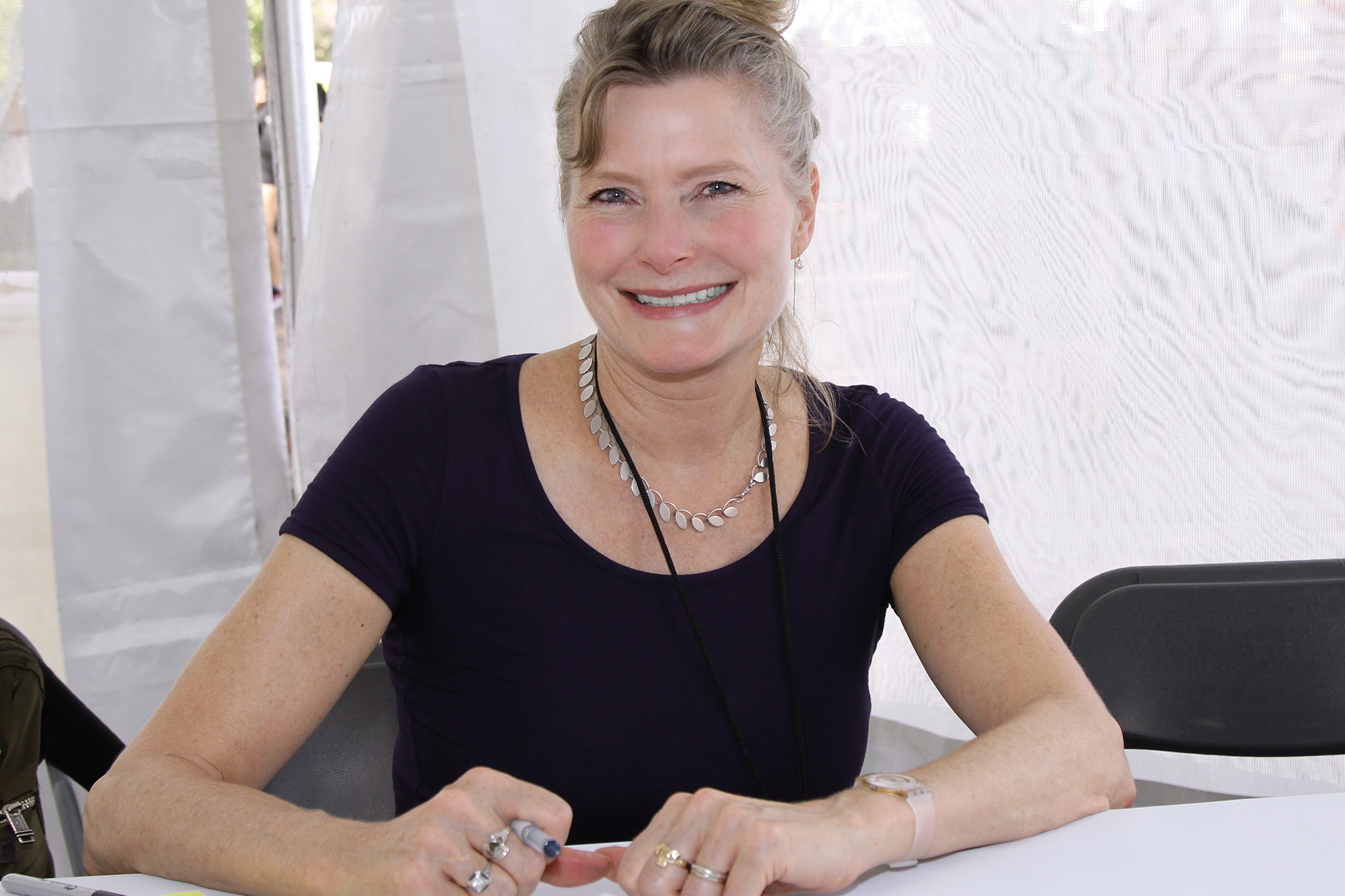
- Egan in 2017
- Born: September 7, 1962 (age 64); Chicago, Illinois, U.S.
- Education: University of Pennsylvania (BA); St John's College, Cambridge (MA)
- Occupation: Novelist
- Spouse: David Herskovits (m. 1994)
- Children: 2
- Writing career
- Genres: Fiction; novel; short story
- Notable works: A Visit from the Goon Squad (2010); Manhattan Beach (2017)
- Notable awards: National Endowment for the Arts Fellowship; Guggenheim Fellowship; Pulitzer Prize for Fiction; National Book Critics Circle Award
- Website: www.jenniferegan.com

Jennifer Egan (born September 7, 1962) is an American novelist and short-story writer. Her novel A Visit from the Goon Squad won the 2011 Pulitzer Prize for Fiction and National Book Critics Circle Award for fiction. From 2018 to 2020, she served as the president of PEN America.

== Early life ==
After graduating from Katherine Delmar Burke School and Lowell High School, Egan majored in English literature at the University of Pennsylvania. As an undergraduate, she dated Steve Jobs, who installed a Macintosh computer in her bedroom. After graduating, she spent two years at St John's College, Cambridge, supported by a Thouron Award, where she earned an M.A. She came to New York in 1987 and worked an array of jobs, including catering at the World Trade Center, while learning to write.

== Career ==
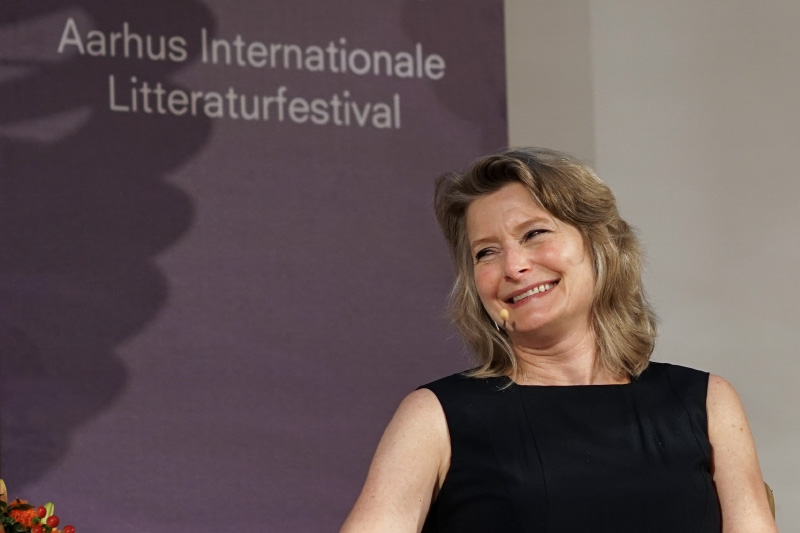
Egan at LiteratureXchange Festival in Aarhus (Denmark 2019)

Egan has published short fiction in the New Yorker, Harper's, Zoetrope: All-Story, and Ploughshares, among other periodicals, and her journalism appears in the New York Times Magazine. Her first novel, The Invisible Circus, was released in 1995 and adapted into a film of the same name in 2001. She has published one short story collection and six novels, among which Look at Me was a finalist for the National Book Award in 2001.

Egan has been hesitant to classify A Visit from the Goon Squad as either a novel or a short story collection, saying, "I wanted to avoid centrality. I wanted polyphony. I wanted a lateral feeling, not a forward feeling. My ground rules were: every piece has to be very different, from a different point of view. I actually tried to break that rule, later; if you make a rule, then you also should break it!" The book features form-breaking content, such as a chapter entirely formatted as a Microsoft PowerPoint presentation. She said, "I don't experience time as linear. I experience it in layers that seem to coexist. […] One thing that facilitates that kind of time travel is music, which is why I think music ended up being such an important part of the book. Also, I was reading Proust. He tries, very successfully, in some ways, to capture the sense of time passing, the quality of consciousness, and the ways to get around linearity, which is the weird scourge of writing prose."

=== Awards ===
Work	Year & Award	Category	Result	Ref.
Look at Me	2001 National Book Award for Fiction		Finalist	
A Visit from the Goon Squad	2010 Los Angeles Times Book Prize	Fiction	Won	
A Visit from the Goon Squad	2010 National Book Critics Circle Award	Fiction	Won	
A Visit from the Goon Squad	2011 Pulitzer Prize for Fiction		Won	
A Visit from the Goon Squad	2011 PEN/Faulkner Award for Fiction		Shortlisted	
A Visit from the Goon Squad	2011 British Book Awards	International Author of the Year	Won	
A Visit from the Goon Squad	2012 International Dublin Literary Award		Shortlisted	
Manhattan Beach	2017 Goodreads Choice Awards	Historical Fiction	Nominated	
Manhattan Beach	2018 Andrew Carnegie Medals	Fiction	Won	
Manhattan Beach	2018 Walter Scott Prize		Shortlisted	
The Candy House	2023 Kurd Laßwitz Award	Foreign Work	Nominated	
The Candy House	2023 BookTube Prize	Fiction	Octofinalist	
The Candy House	2024 Tähtivaeltaja Award		Shortlisted	

Egan received a Thouron Award in 1986, was the recipient of a National Endowment for the Arts Fellowship, and a Guggenheim Fellowship for Fiction in 1996. In 2002, she wrote a cover story on homeless children that received the Carroll Kowal Journalism Award. She was a fellow at the Dorothy and Lewis B. Cullman Center for Scholars and Writers at the New York Public Library in 2004–2005. Her 2008 story on bipolar children won an Outstanding Media Award from the National Alliance on Mental Illness. and was made an Honorary Fellow at St John's College, Cambridge.

== Reception ==
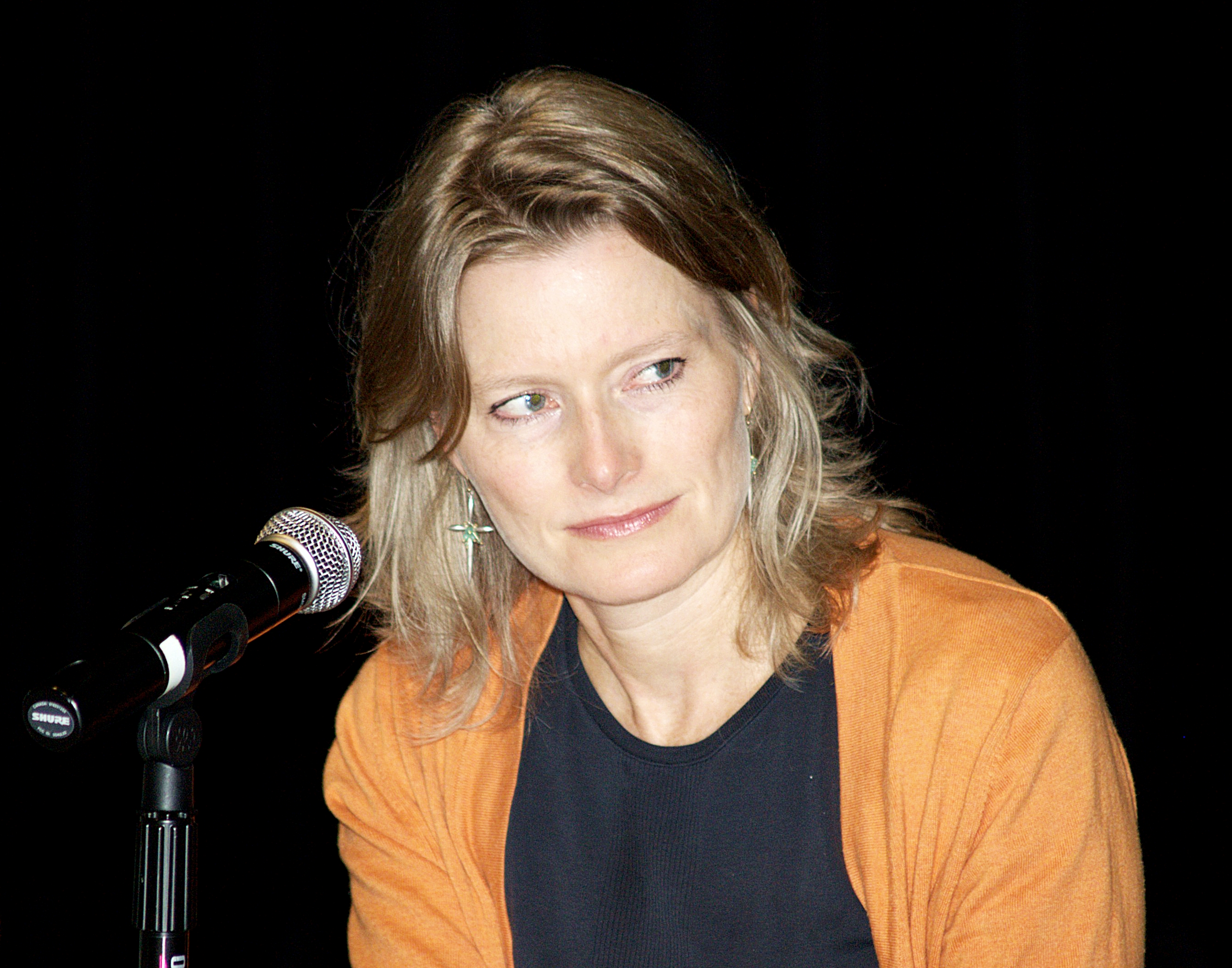
Egan at the 2010 Brooklyn Book Festival

Academic literary critics have examined Egan's work in a variety of contexts. David Cowart has read Egan's project in A Visit from the Goon Squad as indebted to modernist writing but as possessing a closer affinity to postmodernism, in which "she meets the parental postmoderns on their own ground; by the same token, she venerates the grandparental moderns even as she places their mythography under erasure and dismantles their supreme fictions," an aspect also touched upon by Adam Kelly. Baoyu Nie has focused, alternatively, on the ways in which "Egan draws the reader into the addressee role" through the use of second-person narrative technique in her Twitter fiction. Finally, Martin Paul Eve has argued that the university itself is given "quantifiably more space within Egan's work than would be merited under strict societal mimesis", leading him to classify Egan's novels within the history of metafiction.

In 2013, the first academic conference event dedicated to Egan's work was held at Birkbeck, University of London, entitled "Invisible Circus: An International Conference on the work of Jennifer Egan".

== Personal life ==
Egan lives in Clinton Hill, Brooklyn with her husband and two sons.

== Bibliography ==
=== Novels ===
- The Invisible Circus (1994)
- Look at Me (2001)
- The Keep (2006)
- A Visit from the Goon Squad (2010)
- Manhattan Beach (2017)
- The Candy House (2022)

=== Short fiction (partial list) ===
- Emerald City (short story collection; 1993, UK; released in US in 1996)
- "Black Box" (short story; 2012, US; released on The New Yorker's Twitter account)
