= Book History =

- Cover of Book History volume 13 (2010).
- Subject: History
- Language: English
- Edited by: Ezra Greenspan; Jonathan Rose

Publication details
- History: 1998–present
- Publisher: Johns Hopkins University Press for the Society for the History of Authorship, Reading and Publishing (United States)
- Frequency: Annual

Standard abbreviations
- ISO 4: Book Hist.

Indexing
- ISSN: 1098-7371 (print); 1529-1499 (web)
- OCLC no.: 42631160

Links
- Journal homepage; Online access

Book History is the official publication of the Society for the History of Authorship, Reading and Publishing. It was established in 1998 and is published annually by the Johns Hopkins University Press.

Book History is an academic journal devoted to the history of the book, i.e. the history of the creation, dissemination, and reception of script and printed materials. It publishes research on the social, economic, and cultural history of authorship, editing, printing, the book arts, publishing and the book trade, periodicals, newspapers, ephemera, copyright, censorship, literary agents, libraries, literary criticism, canon formation, literacy, literary education, reading habits, and reader response.

== See also ==
- History of books
