= List of Lewis episodes =

The following is a list of the 33-episode run (Note: Series 7–9 are counted here as three episodes each. The three stories were divided into two parts each in the UK for first run, but shown as three singular episodes for each series in markets outside the UK and in subsequent repeat showings in the UK.) for the British drama Lewis, which aired on ITV for nine series (2006–2015).

== Overview ==
Series	Episodes	First released	Last released	DVD release date			Average UK viewers (in millions)
Series	Episodes	First released	Last released	Region 2	Region 4	Region 1	Average UK viewers (in millions)
1	4 (Note: The Series 1 DVD includes the 2006 pilot episode and the three episodes of the 2007 first series.)	29 January 2006	4 March 2007	12 March 2007	31 March 2008	5 August 2008	9.02
2	4	24 February 2008	16 March 2008	7 April 2008	18 May 2009	5 August 2008	8.57
3	4	22 March 2009	12 April 2009	13 April 2009	10 March 2010	13 October 2009	7.04
4	4	2 May 2010	30 May 2010	31 May 2010	6 June 2011	12 October 2010	7.83
5	4	3 April 2011	24 April 2011	25 April 2011	4 April 2012	13 September 2011	6.95
6	4	16 May 2012	6 June 2012	11 June 2012	7 August 2013	24 July 2012	6.63
7	3	7 January 2013	11 February 2013	18 February 2013	6 August 2014	25 June 2013	7.94
8	3	10 October 2014	14 November 2014	17 November 2014	23 September 2015	25 November 2014	6.04 (Note: Series 8, episode 3.2, does not include ratings from ITV HD.)
9	3	6 October 2015	10 November 2015	30 November 2015	6 July 2016	23 August 2016	5.83 (Note: Viewers for Series 9, episodes 1.1, 1.2, 2.2 and 3.2 are based on 28 day data from BARB for ITV and ITV+1 and 7 day data for ITV HD. Episodes 2.1 and 3.1 are based on 28 day data from BARB for ITV and ITV+1.)

== Episodes ==
=== Series 1 (2006–07) ===
No.	Title	Directed by	Written by	Original release date	UK viewers (millions)
1	"Reputation"	Bill Anderson	Russell Lewis (Story), Stephen Churchett (Screenplay)	29 January 2006	11.31
Detective Inspector Robbie Lewis returns to Oxford after two years' secondment to the British Virgin Islands, where he was sent to recover from his wife's death. His new boss, DCS Jean Innocent, reluctantly assigns him to the murder of Oxford mathematics student Regan Peverill, who is shot while participating in a sleep study. The key-code someone used to access the sleep lab is assigned to a fellow maths student, Daniel Griffon, but Daniel's tutor Ivor Denniston provides him with an alibi. Daniel is a maladjusted young man who will soon inherit his father's automotive empire. He is disruptive and has no respect for his uncle Rex, who now heads the company. The future of the company rests on an impending deal with Japanese investors who insist that family unity is all important. Daniel is convinced that his uncle was behind the death in an automobile accident of his father, a famous race car driver. When he was 15, Daniel was arrested on suspicion of tampering with his uncle's car, and Lewis is surprised to learn that his former boss, Chief Inspector Morse, had led that investigation. Rex Griffon admits having a one-night stand with Peverill and asking her to keep quiet about it. Now Daniel thinks Regan was killed by Rex, whom he also suspected of having an affair with his mother Trudi. Tom Pollock, the Griffon's finance director, goes to the sleep lab looking for Daniel and appears to be about to enter a key-code when the security guard lets him in. Back in his college rooms, Daniel is surprised to receive an email that Regan sent before her death. Trudi Griffon is awakened in the middle of the night by a gunshot and finds someone shot in the shower, while a hooded figure runs out of the house. The next day, Daniel is found in his scull on the river, an apparent suicide. When Lewis and Hathaway tell her of Daniel's death, Trudi does not mention the shooting in the house. Reviewing the scene of Daniel's death, Hathaway notices the scull's oars are not set up correctly and were not the type Daniel preferred. Other evidence indicates that he was killed at a different location. Tom Pollock's body is found in the boot of his car, after it was stolen by joy-riding teenagers. He and his daughter Jessica lived in the Griffon's mansion, and he was the person shot in the shower. Pollack, Daniel and Regan were all shot with the same gun. Jessica Pollock, who is competing for a prestigious music award, attempts suicide at the spot where Daniel's body was found but is rescued. Lewis is sure that a cryptic note Morse had left in the case file of Daniel's previous arrest – "Polo not king after all" – is important. He and Hathaway realise that "king" refers to Rex and "Polo" refers to Pollock, who like Polonius in Hamlet was Rex's right-hand man. Pollack, not Rex, was Trudi's lover, and video evidence shows Rex leaving Pollock's car at a railway station car park. Rex says that Trudi had called him to say that Daniel had killed Pollock in the shower, so he disposed of the body. Trudi admits to Lewis that Pollock was actually Daniel's father. After an argument in which she told her husband that he wasn't Daniel's father, he drove off furiously, crashed the car and died. A mathematical clue provided by a friend of Daniel's leads Lewis to the solution for all three deaths. His tutor Ivor Denniston had killed Regan because she came up with a proof for a challenging mathematical problem that revealed a flaw in an important paper of his. He then killed Daniel since he'd also received a copy of Regan's proof, and he mistakenly killed Pollock, intending to kill Rex and implicate Daniel. As Lewis arrests him, he reveals that he has poisoned himself and his wife, who has motor neuron disease. Along with the written clue, the episode includes several other references to Morse. When leaving Heathrow Airport, Lewis is nearly run over by a red Jaguar Mark 2; he knows the word "bruxism" (tooth-grinding) as a result of spending "15 years working for a crossword fanatic"; Trudi Griffon knew Morse and says, "He was a man you could talk to"; Jessica Pollock is being examined for the "Endeavour Award", which had been endowed by an anonymous donor for music that "gives solace to the soul"; and Endeavour was Morse's long-secret first name. Lewis's new bagman, DS James Hathaway, is in some ways a mirror image of Morse. He went to Cambridge, rather than Oxford; and while Morse was an atheist, Hathaway studied theology and considered joining the priesthood. The plot bears some self-conscious parallels to Hamlet, and there are references to King Lear and A Tale of Two Cities. The screenplay is also mathematically literate: professor Ivor Denniston dismisses his class with the joke that there's a sign reading "Heisenberg might have lived here." Lewis asks: "That Heisenberg joke – the uncertainty principle?" to get the riposte "I'm not sure." There are various abstruse clues: the griffin is a cross between an eagle and a lion; perfect numbers are those that are the sum of their factors: 6 = 1+2+3; 28 = 1+2+4+7+14; the next two are 496 and 8,128 – which turns out to be Daniel's computer password. Denniston was probably the only one who would have guessed that Daniel's key code to the sleep lab was "12 47 14".
2	"Whom the Gods Would Destroy"	Marc Jobst	Daniel Boyle	18 February 2007	8.11
DI Lewis and DS Hathaway investigate the murder of artist Dean Greely, beaten to death near his canal boat. As the investigation continues, they discover that Greely and three other men had formed a club during their Oxford student days, the Sons of the Twice Born, a name which refers to the Greek god Dionysus, whose worshipers were admired by philosopher Nietzsche: Harry Bundrick, who runs a bicycle shop with his mother, Dean Greely, a failed painter staying in a canal narrowboat, Sefton Linn, college master and prospective vice-chancellor, Theodor Platt, last remnant of a wealthy family, failed author and alcoholic. He uses a wheelchair since being involved in a head-on collision when under the influence, causing the second driver's death, which particularly irritates Lewis.; The men claim to have little current contact with one another and initially deny the existence of the club. They each have a gold ring bearing the image of Dionysus. Hathaway happens upon the three living members meeting with Professor Margaret Gold, who previously had translated for Lewis Ancient Greek numerals in Dean's address book as phone numbers, leading him to the other three. She later tells Lewis that the four of them met as students in her discussion group, but they left the group later and developed a reputation for drink and drugs. When the four of them fell out, Bundrick attempted suicide and later left the university. Linn appears to have gone missing, but neither Platt nor Bundrick claim to know where he is. When Linn is found shot dead, it becomes apparent that the group has a secret from their student days and that someone is out for revenge. Harry Bundrick appears about to confess something to Lewis, but they are interrupted by his mother, who hated Linn and had sent letters to the college council designed to prevent Linn's appointment. It turns out that the murders have been masterminded by two women. Tina Daniels had been a prostitute and had recommended her friend Patsy Worth to Harry Bundrick. Patsy got drunk or drugged with the Sons of the Twice Born, and when she passed out, they decided to murder her in order to take out her adrenal gland and extract the adrenochrome, which was reputed (by Hunter S. Thompson) to give a very good high. Platt actually carried out the murder. Patsy had a daughter, Anne, who was brought up by Tina. Anne trained as a nurse and got a job as a personal assistant to Platt. A year later she married him, which Platt claims she did because of a potential inheritance. When Platt chokes on some food, Anne saves his life in Lewis's presence. although, as Platt later tells her, she could have let him die. The couple seem to be reconciled, but in reality Tina and Anne are manipulating the Sons of the Twice Born to murder each other: First Tina, posing as a journalist named "Fury" (an allusion to the avenging Furies of classical literature), tells Linn that Greely is near death and is planning to come clean, so he must kill him if the secret is to be kept; She calls Platt threatening his wife and implying she manipulated Linn into killing Greely, which leads Platt to kill Linn; She had contacted Harry Bundrick after sending him a note with the single word "adrenochrome", but he refused to do what she asked, which was kill Linn. She decides that Harry Bundrick is to be spared since he admitted to her what was done to Patsy and has shown remorse.; This leaves Platt, who is the only one who knows where Patsy is buried. Anne telephones him, claiming to be held hostage and that her abductor will release her if he tells her where Patsy's grave is. He tells her she is buried by the statue of Dionysus in their park. Anne then walks into the room and reveals the plot. When he threatens her, she sets their two Belgian Shepherd dogs on him, which tear him to shreds. Patsy's skeleton is disinterred. Previously, Anne had sent Lewis a cryptic note reading "His best friends killed him because of a boast", which could relate to Actaeon who had boasted of being a better shot than Diana and was killed by his own dogs. Hathaway says, "If Anne sent the riddle, she is guilty of premeditated murder. Doesn't it make her just like Platt?" Lewis replies, "Not in my book." Tina and Anne thus stand to face a low penalty, if any, and to become very rich women by inheriting the Platt estate.
3	"Old School Ties"	Sarah Harding	Alan Plater	25 February 2007	7.81
DI Lewis is less than pleased when he and DS Hathaway are assigned to protect Nicky Turnbull, a former convicted cybercriminal and "rock and roll hacker" turned successful author. Turnbull is invited to speak at the Oxford Union. He is met by a welcoming committee composed of Caroline Morton, president of the Union; Jo Gilchrist, student journalist with ambitions to be a tabloid editor; Stephen Gilchrist, her brother, a serious scholar; and David Harvey, a rugby player who had to retire because of an injury. Turnbull cheated two Oxford colleges in his computer scam and has received death threats, so Lewis and Hathaway are tasked with babysitting him. Although Turnbull is everything Lewis dislikes – a celebrity criminal and a "professional Geordie" – he grits his teeth and does the job. Turnbull gives his lecture and afterwards invites his audience to champagne in his hotel, in the converted prison in Oxford Castle. On the way there he is nearly run over by a Jeep, but once he arrives at the hotel, he tells Lewis to go home. Things take a more serious turn the following morning when Jo is found strangled with a revolver by her side in the hotel room next to Turnbull's, which had been booked in Lewis's name. Caroline emerges from Turnbull's room, having spent the night with him. After identifying her body, Jo's brother Stephen interrupts Turnbull's book signing by throwing his bicycle through the bookstore window, claiming "if it wasn't for him, Jo would still be alive." Then, while walking back to the hotel with Lewis, Turnbull is fatally shot by a sniper, right after admitting that the claim of death threats was a publicity stunt. When Stephen Gilchrist comes to confess to smashing the window, he tells Lewis that Jo had requested the gun from David Harvey as a birthday present. Turnbull's wife Diane, who is also his agent, comes to identify his body. In a surprising coincidence, she was at school with Lewis, and he was her first boyfriend. Caroline admits she and Jo planned to catch Turnbull in a "honey trap" that would give Jo a juicy story for the tabloid press. Jo was going to brandish the gun to frighten him, which was not loaded, but she never came into the room. Lewis visits the prison where Turnbull had been incarcerated and where he met his wife, who was running a drama therapy programme. He learns that Turnbull had embellished his book with experiences from some of the other prisoners and that he was functionally illiterate when he arrived there, meaning that Diane must have actually written his book. As she is uncomfortable staying at the hotel where two murders took place, Diane stays at Lewis's home for the night. In another coincidence, David Harvey was at the same public school as Hathaway and remembers him as the head boy. He tells him the other students referred to him "WC", short for "Wolfgang Christ", as they couldn't work out whether he wanted to be Mozart or Jesus. It is revealed that Hathaway plays the guitar, specifically world music mixed with jazz, rock and medieval madrigals. Diane tells Lewis that Turnbull's speech was set up by Harvey, not by Jo Gilchrist as he'd been told. When Turnbull hacked the Oxford colleges' investment accounts, stealing large amounts of money, Harvey's father lost his job and committed suicide. On the night of Turnbull's talk, Harvey brought Jo bullets for the gun he'd given her, hoping she might shoot him. But she refused, saying she found him "kind of cute", leading Harvey to kill her. The next day he shot Turnbull from the hotel roof.
4	"Expiation"	Dan Reed	Guy Andrews	4 March 2007	8.85
In Summertown, Oxford housewife Rachel Mallory is found hanged in her home. The locum pathologist states it is a suicide, but several factors lead Lewis to realise it was a staged murder, which sets him at odds with his boss, DCS Innocent. Oxford don Edward le Passiter contacts Lewis when he reads of Rachel's death. The eminent legal scholar, who is terminally ill, asks Lewis for help in locating former student George Stoker, whom he had sent down after an incident in which he had kissed Stoker. He claims to know who killed Rachel Mallory but will share that information only if Stoker is found. Lewis interviews Hugh Mallory's partner and best friend David Hayward and his wife Louise, who are stunned by Rachel's death. Hugh's mother Eleanor tells Lewis that, several years ago, David and Hugh decided to swap wives while on holiday, with the children in each marriage staying with their mothers. So Rachel was originally married to David, and Louise to Hugh. Hathaway locates Stoker working at a local supermarket, and though he has a history of substance abuse and fragile mental health, Stoker agrees to meet with Le Passiter. When the two men meet, Le Passiter, who is now blind, apologises for ruining Stoker's life and gives Hathaway the name Jane Templeton. When Hathaway leaves, Stoker tells Le Passiter he forgives him. When Hathaway and Lewis arrive at Templeton's home, they find her dead in her running car in the closed garage. Dr Hobson, back from leave, finds that she was suffocated and the scene was constructed to make the murder appear a suicide. She also determined that Rachel was strangled before being hanged, making her death a murder as well. On his deathbed, Le Passiter reveals Rachel's secret. When she was 9 years old, she cut off her baby brother's hands to stop him scratching his face, which of course killed him. Jane Templeton was a government worker assigned to keep an eye on Rachel after her release from prison. Hugh was unaware of Rachel's history until Templeton revealed it to him, and he killed both women. Lewis and Hathaway catch up with Hugh at the natural history museum where he has taken his daughters and stop him from jumping from the building's tower with them.

=== Series 2 (2008) ===
No.	Title	Directed by	Written by	Original release date	UK viewers (millions)
5	"And the Moonbeams Kiss the Sea"	Dan Reed	Alan Plater	24 February 2008	8.90
The murders of Reg Chapman, a maintenance worker at the Bodleian Library, and Nell Buckley, a popular art student, initially seem unrelated. Chapman is found shot dead in the basement stacks. When Hathaway visits Chapman's widow, he finds several old books that were taken from the library, which is against the rules. When the books are returned to the library, it is discovered that some of the blank end-pages had been removed. They also find that original manuscripts of several Shelley poems in the library's collection have been replaced with forgeries. Buckley leads a "Secrets of Oxford" tour of dubious accuracy. Her body is found in the river, and a bump on the back of her head suggests it wasn't suicide. Lewis and Hathaway catch up with her friend and housemate, art student Philip Horton, in the Ashmolean Museum. He admits that he and Buckley had a disagreement about art – while he can draw and paint brilliantly, she looked on the fictitious information in her tours as conceptual art. Chapman was addicted to gambling, and maths tutor Sandra Walters, a counsellor for Gamblers Anonymous, had put Chapman in touch with English literature tutor Dr Stringer, who was to be Chapman's GA mentor. Stringer says Chapman was "too far gone" in his addiction to recover. Buckley and Horton, who appears to be on the autism spectrum, were housemates with several other Oxford students. One of them, maths student Eric Jameson, works in a bookmaker's where Chapman placed bets, although he says he had only routine contact with Chapman. Buckley's art tutor tells Lewis that she had a problem drawing the line between "a genuine work of imagination and . . a pathetic, adolescent practical joke". She also explains that Buckley and Horton were working together to create obvious parody letters from famous individuals such as Shakespeare, Walter Raleigh and Shelly. Then Hathaway finds forged letters in Nell's locker purporting to be from Shelley to his wife Mary. If the letters, which support the theory that Mary's famous novel Frankenstein was actually written by her husband, had been genuine, they would have been "worth an absolute fortune". When Lewis and Hathaway go to the students' house to investigate whether Jameson was involved in moving the forgeries back and forth from the Bodleian via Chapman, he has disappeared. Horton, who possesses a photographic memory, accurately draws a location Jameson had previously asked him to draw, which Hathaway recognises. Jameson is found there safe and admits passing packages back and forth between Buckley and Chapman, believing it was one of her art projects. While Horton had previously told Hathaway that Buckley would never ask him to do something illegal, he admits writing the Frankenstein letters at her direction. She had told him it was an art project and she wasn't going to sell them. He draws the riverside spot where he was supposed to meet Buckley on the day she died, and the picture includes the silhouette of a man he saw across the river. That man turns out to be Stringer. American art and antiques dealer Quentin Jackson is in Oxford to check on the validity of the Frankenstein letters, which had been offered to a client of his who previously purchased genuine Shelley manuscripts from Walters. She and Stringer were behind the scheme to sell stolen or forged documents. Stringer killed Chapman when he demanded more money for his assistance and Buckley because she was going to present the creation of the Frankenstein letters as a conceptual art project, which would expose them as forgeries.
6	"Music to Die For"	Bill Anderson	Dusty Hughes	2 March 2008	8.50
R.G. Cole, an elderly Oxford don, is found strangled at the home of his friend Richard Helm, who claims to have been out of the house when it happened. Helm also has a black eye he says is the result of a scuffle he and Cole had with the bouncer of a private club earlier that evening. Cole was an expert on German history and a fan of Wagner's operas. Helm met Cole when he came to visit Helm's father – a great Wagner expert – in what was then East Germany. Helm and his mother came to England after his father was arrested and killed by the Stasi secret police. Cole also loved boxing, both the legitimate fights at the Oxford Boxing Club and illegal bare-knuckle fights set up locally. Student boxers Jack Roth and Milo Hardy are rivals for the affection of Sarah Kriel, the daughter of Hansie and Ann Kriel, who run a group of trendy clubs. Roth participates in the bare-knuckle fights, and the emotional Hardy challenges him to a "last man standing" fight for Sarah's favour. Hardy was a student of Cole, who had suggested he talk with Helm for his essay on the last days of communism in East Germany. Hardy travels to Berlin to research some information in the Stasi archive, but the day after he returns to Oxford, he does not show up for the fight with Roth. Instead he is found dead of a broken neck, apparently having jumped from the window of his college rooms. The suicide note in his pocket is typed, which raises Lewis's suspicions, and Dr Hobson's examination reveals Hardy was not killed where he was found. Lewis realises that soil found on Hardy's body could have come from the rose garden outside the Kriel home, where he had previously found Hardy with Sarah. This time he finds a very upset Sarah, who tells him Hardy had come there drunk, told her she'd ruined his life, and jumped or fell out the window. She admits moving his body, but the tire tracks in the lawn don't match her car. Information Hathaway discovers in the Stasi archive reveals that Hardy had reviewed the file on Helm's father, Magnus, who had been betrayed by an informant code-named Siegfried. Lewis first wonders whether Siegfried might have been Hansie Kriel, who admits pushing Hardy off the balcony and moving his body. But an item in the Stasi file suggests to Lewis that "Siegfried" was actually a woman. Another name on the list of those who read the Magnus Helms file turns out to be Ann Kriel's maiden name. As an 18-year-old, enticed by black market items, she had given Stasi the information that led to Magnus's arrest. She had known Richard Helm when they were young in Lipezig, and she asked Ryan Gallen, her lover and the private club bouncer, to kill Richard. But since Cole had yelled at him in German when being thrown out of the club, Gallen was confused about who "the German" was and strangled Cole. As Richard takes Ann down the canal in his boat, he tells her he knows she betrayed his father but forgives her. She seems to accept his forgiveness, but when they are opening the lock gates, she hits him over the head with the crank handle. He holds tight to the lock mechanism, but she loses her balance, falls into the lock and drowns. In reviewing materials pertaining to the case, Lewis finds that the item Ann had passed on to Stasi was a letter from Inspector Morse, who had admired Magnus's work on Wagner. Because Morse used Oxford Police franking as postage on the letter, Stasi thought Magnus was a spy for the west.
7	"Life Born of Fire"	Richard Spence	Tom MacRae	9 March 2008	8.19
A student called Will McEwan shoots himself in the head in St. Mark's Church, after pointing the pistol at Reverend Francis King. The next day, King is found tortured and murdered by a hot poker thrust into his head. The two of them were both involved with The Garden, a group offering "Christian answers to contemporary questions”, based at Mayfield College, where King had been dean until recently. Hathaway went to school with Will, and they were close friends for a while. Will was estranged from his father, a prominent local builder, probably because he was gay. Will’s mother is surprised by his suicide because he'd seemed very happy with a new girlfriend, Zoë Kenneth; but Hathaway says Will was definitely gay. He left a suicide note: "On the road from Gethsemane to Calvary, I lost my way." The scene of King’s murder reveals that Stravinsky’s “Firebird Suite” had been playing on the phonograph, the words “life born of fire” were painted on a door, and King’s note paper had the image of a phoenix. A photo in King’s files of members of The Garden includes Carey Melville, who’d been dean of Mayfield before King, and Lady Hugh, the college warden, who previously told Lewis she knew nothing about The Garden. There is also a letter from Lady Hugh removing King from his positions at the college, which Lewis notes includes a logo of a Phoenix. Hathaway tries to contact Will’s former lover, Feardorcha Phelan, but although his calls to Phelan’s number go through, no one answers. A search for information on Phelan indicates he moved to Brazil, after which he seems to have disappeared. Will’s mother tells Lewis and Hathaway that her son had been happy when he was with Phelan, but when they broke up, Will seemed to “fade away.” Hathaway admits that when Will came out to him as gay, when they were both 14, he acted like “a horrible teenager” and laughed at him, which ended their friendship. Both Melville and Lady Hugh are murdered with methods that relate to fire – Lady Hugh beaten to death with a statue of the Roman fire god Vulcan and Melville with an injection into his IV bag of a chemical that makes him feel like he’s burning up inside. “Life born of fire” is written at both crime scenes, and Phelan’s fingerprint is found on the syringe used to inject Melville’s IV bag. The Mayfield Gay Pride march, which Lady Hugh had tried to stop, is dedicated to Will’s memory. The organiser shows a video he received from Will, in which he says that he and Phelan went to The Garden looking for some counseling but found its purpose was “to cure gays.” A friend encouraged him to stay with The Garden, but “they ripped me apart.” Lewis asks Hathaway if he was that friend, which he reluctantly admits. At the time, he was in the midst of training for the priesthood, and his regret at the impact of what he told Will was part of why he left the church. Will’s former girlfriend Zoë Kenneth, who’d met with Hathaway several times during the investigation, invites him back to her home. At the same time, Lewis has the idea to check a website that gives the meaning of names and finds that “Zoë Kenneth” means “life born of fire.” Having given Hathaway a sedative, Kenneth tells him she is Phelan; she had gender reassignment and facial plastic surgery in Brazil. But even though Will paid for her surgery, he still couldn’t live with himself as gay. Kenneth blames The Garden and Hathaway himself for Will’s suicide. She killed King, Melville and Lady Hugh and now sets fire to her home, intending to die along with Hathaway in “the cleansing fire.” Lewis and other police arrive in time to carry both of them out, but when the house explodes and Kenneth is dropped, she runs back into the fire to her death.
8	"The Great and the Good"	Stuart Orme	Paul Rutman	16 March 2008	8.70
Following a squash injury, Lewis ends up in casualty where he meets the Donnelly family, whose schoolgirl daughter Beatrice had been drugged and then woke up in a field, discovering that she had been raped. Evidence points to Oswald Cooper, who worked at her school and whose prescription drug matches the doping agent. However, he has an alibi, a dinner party he hosted for three former student friends, now all eminent men: Gavin Matthews, a controversial radio personality; Danny Adebayou, a city developer; and Simon Ashton, a British diplomat. The next day Cooper is found garrotted and castrated. Forensic evidence backs the view that he raped Beatrice, and his alibi is proved to be false. A friend of Cooper's who is blackmailing the three guests is also garroted. It is clear that Cooper serviced his former friends by organising scams and deceptions for them. However, the solution to the case reveals that Cooper's murderer is protecting and preserving a far more personal secret. Jason Watkins and Kwame Kwei-Armah also appear.

=== Series 3 (2009) ===
No.	Title	Directed by	Written by	Original release date	UK viewers (millions)
9	"Allegory of Love"	Bill Anderson	David Pirie (Story), Stephen Churchett (Screenplay)	22 March 2009	7.54
Lewis and Hathaway discover that the bizarre murder of a Czech (actually, Bosnian) barmaid with an antique Persian mirror parallels a similar killing found in a newly published fantasy novel, by the young Oxford author Dorian Crane (Tom Mison). The life of another young woman is threatened, leading Lewis to suspect that the murdered girl is a victim of mistaken identity. The investigation becomes even more complex when Crane is murdered with a sword at a university function. Part of Series 2 in the U.S. Art Malik, James Fox, and Olly Alexander also appear.
10	"The Quality of Mercy"	Bille Eltringham	Alan Plater	29 March 2009	7.19
A preview performance of a student production of The Merchant of Venice is cut short when the actor playing Shylock is stabbed to death with a prop knife. Lewis and Hathaway are working their way through a lengthy list of suspects when an ambitious journalist and friend of the cast (Shereen Martineau) is also killed. It turns out that a female professor (Maureen Beattie), whose ornate turreted house is a residence for her student actors, committed the murders to protect her career. Her reputation was threatened because she connived in plagiarism by knowingly awarding a doctorate to the play's director (Daisy Lewis) for a thesis that was actually written by the student's then-boyfriend (Bryan Dick). Both murder victims were aware of the plagiarism. In parallel, a man (Ronan Vibert) incompetently running a hotel fraud in which his sister and accomplice repeatedly "steals" his suitcases from hotels turns out to be the hit-and-run driver who killed Lewis's wife Val. Lewis and Hathaway attend the driver's trial at which he pleads guilty to manslaughter. Part of Series 2 in the U.S. Gwilym Lee guest stars in this episode.
11	"The Point of Vanishing"	Maurice Phillips	Paul Rutman	5 April 2009	6.83
Lewis and Hathaway investigate the murder of a man found beaten and drowned in his bath. The deceased is identified as a religious fanatic who once attempted to murder a celebrated atheist, Tom Rattenbury (Julian Wadham), but instead disabled Rattenbury's daughter. Investigations reveal that the deceased is another man entirely, the two having chosen to swap identities. Part of Series 2 in the U.S.
12	"Counter Culture Blues"	Bill Anderson	Nick Dear (Story), Guy Andrews (Screenplay)	12 April 2009	6.61
Lewis, called out to deal with a noise complaint, is shocked to meet a rock star, the lead singer of iconic band Midnight Addiction (David Hayman, Anthony Higgins, Trevor Byfield), Esme Ford (Joanna Lumley), whom he had once admired, and who was believed to have drowned years ago. The body of a teenage boy, who has been repeatedly run over by a vehicle, points to a connection with members of the band. Also appearing are Simon Callow, Harry Lloyd, Daniel Kaluuya and Perdita Weeks.

=== Series 4 (2010) ===
No.	Title	Directed by	Written by	Original release date	UK viewers (millions)
13	"The Dead of Winter"	Bill Anderson	Russell Lewis	2 May 2010	8.70
With Hathaway still reeling from a particularly horrific investigation, the team investigates a murder discovered on a tour bus where none of the passengers can remember the victim. The investigation leads Lewis and Hathaway to an estate, Crevecoeur Hall, reputedly associate with treasure from the English Civil War and the ancestral home of the wealthy Mortmaignes where Hathaway grew up. The detectives are soon investigating a second murder. Part of Series 3 in the U.S.
14	"Dark Matter"	Bille Eltringham	Stephen Churchett	9 May 2010	8.23
Lewis and Hathaway investigate the killing in suspicious circumstances of Professor Andrew Crompton, amateur astronomer and Master of Gresham College. Crompton was found dead at the university observatory after making a strange confession to a priest. His widow suspected that he had been having an affair, but Lewis and Hathaway discover that the dead man had a curious obsession. Part of Series 3 in the U.S.
15	"Your Sudden Death Question"	Dan Reed	Alan Plater	16 May 2010	7.29
The body of a philandering primary school teacher is found floating in a fountain during a quiz weekend, an event which is hosted at Chaucer College over a bank holiday. Suspicion initially falls on two competitors with whom the dead man had been flirting, but then one of them is found dead. Lewis soon finds that the first victim was involved in a secret government operation and that several of the other quiz participants are connected to it, too. Part of Series 3 in the U.S. Also appearing are Sally Bretton, Alan Davies and Timothy West.
16	"Falling Darkness"	Nicholas Renton	Russell Lewis	30 May 2010	7.10
Stem cell researcher Ligeia Willard is murdered with a stake through her heart on Halloween. Dr Laura Hobson reveals that the victim is a former university friend of hers. When more murders occur that are connected to Laura's past – one in the house where she and her friends had lived and another of a woman who had called Laura twice in recent months – Lewis wonders whether the pathologist is holding something back. A medium, who claims to have foreseen the first death, conducts a séance; but Lewis and Hathaway rely on more conventional methods to solve the murders. Part of Series 3 in the U.S.

=== Series 5 (2011) ===
No.	Title	Directed by	Written by	Original release date	UK viewers (in millions; Includes ITV HD and ITV1+1)
17	"Old, Unhappy, Far Off Things"	Nicholas Renton	Russell Lewis	3 April 2011	7.38
Professor Diana Ellerby is leaving Oxford's last remaining all-women's college, which is about to admit men. During a reunion of old students, one of them, Poppy Toynton, is murdered. Ten years previously the college was the location of an attack at a college party on the younger sister of another old student, Ruth Brooks, and the sister is still in a coma. The young man thought to have been the attacker disappeared before he could be arrested. Lewis believes there could be a connection with the current murder and consults with his former DS, Ali McLennan. When Chloe Brooks unexpectedly regains consciousness, she denies any memory of the attack. As the murder investigation continues, secrets, blackmail and more bodies are uncovered. Part of Series 4 in the U.S.
18	"Wild Justice"	Hettie Macdonald	Stephen Churchett	10 April 2011	6.69
A female bishop visiting St Gerard's College is found dead after drinking poisoned wine. Lewis and Hathaway suspect that she has been killed because of her progressive views. When another two killings occur, both mirroring macabre murders from a Jacobean revenge tragedy, it appears the murderer is targeting candidates for the post of vice-regent of the college. However, after learning that one of the suspects harbors a dark secret, Lewis and Hathaway realise the motive is much more twisted and that the murderer is avenging a deadly incident from more than twenty years earlier. Part of Series 4 in the U.S.
19	"The Mind Has Mountains"	Charles Palmer	Patrick Harbinson	17 April 2011	7.12
A student dies, apparently from suicide, during a residential clinical trial for a new antidepressant. When Dr. Hobson finds evidence indicating murder, the investigation by Lewis and Hathaway is hampered by the professor of psychiatry who was conducting the trial. Another death of a trial participant, followed by an attempted murder present the pair with a complex mix of suspects and motives. Part of Series 4 in the U.S. This episode features guest actors from rival ITV crime drama Midsomer Murders: Christina Cole, Sam Hazeldine and Lucy Liemann; and BBC programme Shetland: Douglas Henshall.
20	"The Gift of Promise"	Metin Hüseyin	Dusty Hughes & Stephen Churchett	24 April 2011	6.62
Lewis and Hathaway investigate the murder of a woman who ran an organisation for the parents of gifted children. She had apparently been blackmailing the father of the recipient of the programme's scholarship. The memoirs of a former head of MI5 provide Lewis with a vital clue, one which leads the investigation to discover the involvement of old romantic passions and the Irish Republican Army (IRA). Part of Series 4 in the U.S.

=== Series 6 (2012) ===
No.	Title	Directed by	Written by	Original release date	UK viewers (in millions; Includes ITV HD and ITV1+1)
21	"The Soul of Genius"	Brian Kelly	Rachel Bennette	16 May 2012	6.94
A botanist accidentally unearths the recently buried corpse of a professor who was fixated upon solving the potential riddle of "The Hunting of the Snark", a cryptic nonsense poem by Lewis Carroll. The victim had a long-standing rivalry with his brother, giving Lewis and Hathaway an obvious suspect, but the case is hindered by the mind games of two students who seem intent on causing trouble in their quest to gain admittance to a mysterious elite club. Part of Series 5 in the U.S.
22	"Generation of Vipers"	David O'Neill	Patrick Harbinson	23 May 2012	6.47
A professor feels humiliated when her internet dating video is leaked onto a website, watched by her students and generates cruel comments. The next morning she is found dead, the victim of what appears to be a straightforward suicide. However, Lewis is not convinced and digs deeper, identifying several suspects, including the website's founder. But as he and Hathaway get closer to the truth amid a rising death toll, they find their own personal and professional lives dredged up online for all to see. Part of Series 5 in the U.S.
23	"Fearful Symmetry"	Nicholas Renton	Russell Lewis	30 May 2012	6.46
The murder of a babysitter throws up a number of questions for Lewis and Hathaway. Was she the intended target, or was the killer aiming for her employers? Was the crime calculated or opportunistic? And why was she elaborately tied up after being murdered? Soon after the first death, a friend of the dead woman is brutally killed, which brings up a number of new questions. As the detectives dig for clues, they are led into a world of suburban swinging and fetish photography, far removed from the Oxford they know. Part of Series 5 in the U.S.
24	"The Indelible Stain"	Tim Fywell	Simon Block	6 June 2012	6.64
When a visiting American academic delivers a controversial speech about "criminal dangerousness", many audience members are worried that his ideas could be used to target ethnic minorities. Thus when he is found hanged the next morning and Dr Hobson quickly discounts suicide, Lewis and Hathaway realise they have many suspects – from the local anti-racism activist who is first in voicing her disgust at the professor's beliefs to the women who had bombarded him with threatening emails. But then another body turns up, and the detectives find themselves pursuing even more leads. Part of Series 5 in the U.S.

=== Series 7 (2013) ===
This series consists of three stories, each divided into two parts in the UK. In Australia, Belgium, The Netherlands, Germany and the United States, the stories were not divided, rather each shown as an entire piece. (Repeat showings in the UK, on ITV3, were similarly complete.)

No.	Title	Directed by	Written by	Original release date	UK viewers (in millions; Includes ITV1 HD and ITV1+1 later ITV HD and ITV +1)
25	"Down Among the Fearful"	Brian Kelly	Simon Block & Catherine Tregenna	7 January 2013; 14 January 2013	8.21; 8.09
The death of psychology research fellow Reuben Beatty throws up a number of questions when he is found murdered in the offices of psychic Randolph James. It soon becomes clear that the two were one and the same: Beatty was moonlighting as a clairvoyant. Lewis struggles to unravel his double life whilst contending with Oxford's sinister psychic community and politics within the psychology department. Part of Series 6 in the U.S. Shown in one piece on 16 June 2013.
26	"The Ramblin' Boy"	Dan Reed	Lucy Gannon	21 January 2013; 28 January 2013	7.67; 8.21
When body is found in remarkably pristine condition near an isolated farm, Hobson makes the surprising discovery that the elderly man had already been embalmed and prepared for the funeral. With Hathaway on holiday renovating an orphanage in Kosovo, Lewis is assisted by newly promoted DC Alex Gray (Babou Ceesay). The body is identified by a wrist tag found nearby, but the director of the funeral home initially insists that man had been cremated. As Lewis and Gray work to discover who was in the incinerated coffin, another man is killed and two students are attacked. With long-distance help from Hathaway, they reveal a conspiracy among a prominent local investor, the funeral home director, a local physician and a corrupt police officer to smuggle crystal meth from Croatia within the bodies of people who died abroad. Lewis and Hobson “go public” with their relationship by sharing a passionate kiss in front of Innocent and Hathaway, and DC Gray reveals to the sister of one of the victims why he was eager to work with Lewis. Part of Series 6 in the U.S. Shown in one piece on 23 June 2013.
27	"Intelligent Design"	Tim Fywell	Stephen Churchett (Story), Helen Jenkins (Screenplay)	4 February 2013; 11 February 2013	7.58; 7.90
An elderly former don, Richard Seager, is run down by his own car during the night after his release from prison, where he'd been incarcerated for killing a young woman while driving drunk. Before dying, he scratched what looks like the number "500" into the paintwork with his keys. Lewis must contend with Seager's wife, convinced that the sister of her husband's victim is the guilty party. Seager was a proponent of the intelligent design theory of nature, which put him at odds with the head of his college, Graham Yardley, who believed that Seager's creationist viewpoint disqualified him as a science instructor. When the desiccated remains of a woman are found in a part of the college undergoing construction, it appears that Seager was not scratching in a number but the name of Soo-Min Chong, a Korean student of Seager's who had disappeared 15 years earlier. Lewis begins seriously considering retirement. Part of Series 6 in the U.S. Shown in one piece on 30 June 2013.

=== Series 8 (2014) ===
This series again consists of three stories, each divided into two parts in the UK. In Belgium and the United States, the stories were not divided, rather each is shown as an entire piece. (Repeat showings in the UK, on ITV3, were similarly complete.)

No.	Title	Directed by	Written by	Original release date	UK viewers (in millions; Includes ITV HD and ITV+1)
28	"Entry Wounds"	Nicholas Renton	Helen Jenkins	10 October 2014; 17 October 2014	7.01; 6.41
Hathaway returns from making the Camino de Santiago pilgrimage, and he starts work on his first murder case as an inspector with the help of a new partner, DS Lizzie Maddox. A well-respected neurosurgeon has been shot, and the case becomes still more complicated when his friend and business partner, the co-owner of the hunting estate where the shooting occurred, is also murdered – apparently with the same weapon, though it was locked away in the police evidence room after the first murder. This second victim had been the prime suspect for the first killing, but there's no shortage of other suspects, as the neurosurgeon turns out to have made several enemies through his work, including a complaint of negligence for a botched operation that left a young man in a vegetative state. As Hathaway and Maddox delve into the worlds of neurosurgery, blood sport and animal rights, Hathaway is unwilling to delegate responsibility to an increasingly frustrated Maddox. He requests help from Innocent, who persuades the now-retired Lewis to come back on a one-year contract (to the annoyance of Laura Hobson, who had hoped for a quieter life with her retired partner). Part of Series 7 in the U.S. Shown in one piece on 5 October 2014.
29	"The Lions of Nemea"	Nick Laughland	Tahsin Güner (Idea), Noel Farragher & Nick Hicks-Beach (Screenplay)	24 October 2014; 31 October 2014	5.95; 6.31
Lewis, Hathaway and Maddox's abilities as a team are severely tested when they investigate the brutal stabbing of American classics scholar Rose Anderson, who was killed while jogging. She had been having an affair with astronomy professor Felix Garwood, whose wife Philippa was her academic supervisor. Garwood had recently dumped her, and she retaliated by knocking him off his bike in her blue Mini. Garwood later meets a violent end in his office filled with antique astronomical instruments, including a telescope that had previously belonged to Isaac Newton. Meanwhile, questions arise regarding classics professor Simon Flaxmore, who had made his name by apparently rediscovering the lost Euripides play Alcmaeon in Corinth (Ἀλκμαίων ὁ διὰ Κορίνθου, 405 BC). He insists that he never spoke to Rose, which is unlikely, given that she was studying the subject on which he is world expert. Hathaway works out that the "rediscovered" play is a fraud, as it refers to the "two lions of Nemea", whereas Leo Minor was designated as a constellation by Johannes Hevelius in only 1687. Flaxmore's fingerprints reveal that he is Linus Cage, who was imprisoned for fraud, released in 1985 and appointed an Oxford classics professor in 1992 based on a fabricated CV. Anderson had discovered this and was planning to expose him. Felix's sister-in-law Jennie Brightway has a daughter Tabitha with Fanconi anaemia, whom Anderson tutored. Jennie Brightway and her husband Paul have been struggling to find the money for in vitro fertilisation in order to engender a saviour sibling, and Anderson had donated a large sum to help them. Could they be connected somehow to the murders of their tutor and brother-in-law? It was only when the Brightways undertook in vitro fertilisation that Paul discovered that Jenny and Garwood had had an affair and that Tabitha is Garwood's biological daughter. Paul Brightway killed Garwood because he threatened to take Jennie Brightway and the children away from him. Part of Series 7 in the U.S. Shown in one piece on 12 October 2014.
30	"Beyond Good and Evil"	David Drury	Noel Farragher	7 November 2014; 14 November 2014	5.75; 4.80
Thirteen years ago, Lewis successfully apprehended hammer killer Graham Lawrie, who was convicted and sent to prison. Now Lawrie is on the verge of regaining his freedom thanks to new evidence. Lewis fears the worst, but nothing can prepare him for a string of murders that resemble those in the original case but occur while Lawrie is incarcerated. With his mentor's reputation in jeopardy, Hathaway races to catch the killer. Part of Series 7 in the U.S. Shown in one piece on 19 October 2014.

=== Series 9 (2015) ===
The final series consists of three stories, each divided into two parts in the UK. In the United States, the stories were not divided; rather, each was shown as an entire piece.

No.	Title	Directed by	Written by	Original release date	UK viewers (in millions; Includes ITV HD and ITV+1)
31	"One For Sorrow"	Nick Laughland	Helen Jenkins	6 October 2015; 13 October 2015	6.38; 5.97
New boss CS Joseph Moody arrives at Oxfordshire Police, and he begins to question Lewis's role as a consultant. After an exhibition of anthropomorphic taxidermy, the body of a young avant-garde artist is found. She died from a heroin overdose, but in addition to her being in recovery, this dose does not appear to be self-administered. Lewis, Hathaway and Maddox must delve into the worlds of social media, drugs, taxidermy, alternative art and the homeless East European community. Meanwhile, Hathaway confronts his father and sister, with whom he does not have good relationships. Part of Series 8 in the U.S. Shown in one piece on 7 August 2016.
32	"Magnum Opus"	Matthew Evans	Chris Murray	20 October 2015; 27 October 2015	5.31; 5.66
Lewis and Hathaway investigate the murders of three people, all members of a spiritual cult, the "Companions of Co-inherence". This group revived the ideas of writer and theologian Charles Williams, who taught that not only God can forgive sin. We can also take another's guilt on ourselves through the ritual of “substitution". The murders follow the four stages of the alchemical process of the magnum opus: 1. Negredo – black – raven – decomposition: College dean and Tolkien specialist Phil Beskin is lured into the woods, knocked out, semi-buried and covered with maggots.; 2. Albedo – white – moon, purification: After undergoing the substitution ritual, Annapurna Kinneson is strangled and then tied to a post in the river so that the water can purify her.; 3. Citrinitas – yellow – sun, male, enlightenment: After his assistant Gina Doran is lured out of his tattoo parlour, Jay Fennell is stabbed into the heart and covered in a yellow substance.; 4. Rubedo – red – blood; Beskin's sister Carina confesses that eight years ago the four – Phil and Carina Beskin, Fennell, and Kinneson – were driving home late at night without headlights and killed Francis Fisher, a practising alchemist. Carina Beskin was driving while drunk, but the group escaped punishment because they lied. Phil Beskin and Kinneson had used the doctrine of substitution as a way of coping with their guilt. Three additional plot lines develop: (1) Laura persuades Lewis to look forward to their trip to New Zealand; (2) Moody overcomes his doubts and agrees that Hathaway will get on fine while Lewis is away; (3) Hathaway – who has been avoiding seeing his father – visits his old monastery school and learns from one of the priests that his father had wanted to repair their estrangement. Part of Series 8 in the U.S. Shown in one piece on 14 August 2016.
33	"What Lies Tangled"	David Drury	Nick Hicks-Beach	3 November 2015; 10 November 2015	5.44; 6.23
Last ever episode. A summer's day in Oxford is torn apart, when a parcel bomb explodes, and the team are called in to investigate. The victim is a brilliant mathematics professor who was known to have had numerous affairs with younger women. His brother, with whom he founded a company applying their esoteric research to the development of gene therapies, survives a second bombing. Reluctant to take his planned six-month trip to New Zealand with Hobson, Lewis is in a race against time to save his career and relationship. In the end, Lewis and Hobson finally leave for New Zealand. Part of Series 8 in the U.S. Shown in one piece on 21 August 2016.
