= Maisie Ayres =

English actress

- Born: Maisie Jennifer Ayres c. 2001
- Education: Guildhall School of Music and Drama
- Occupation: Actress
- Years active: 2023–present

Maisie Jennifer Ayres (born c. 2001) is an English actress.

== Early life and education ==
Ayres attended Sylvia Young Theatre School between 2012 and 2017. She then attended the Arts Educational Schools in London for sixth form, before graduating from the Guildhall School of Music and Drama in 2022.

== Career ==
Ayres appeared in the long-running BBC One television series Silent Witness in 2023. She played Lisa Hegarty in a recurring role in the Apple TV+ crime drama series Criminal Record alongside Peter Capaldi and Cush Jumbo in 2024.

She made her feature film debut in 2024 folk comedy horror film Get Away alongside Nick Frost and Aisling Bea who play her parents. Describing herself as a big fan of the horror genre and Frost's previous work, she accepted the role without having read the full script.

== Filmography ==
Year	Title	Role	Notes
2023	Silent Witness	Maeve Tooney	Series 26 (2 episodes: "Family Faces: Parts 1 & 2")
2024	Criminal Record	Lisa Hegarty	Series 1 (5 episodes)
2024	Get Away	Jessie Smith	Feature film
2025	Trigger Point	Wren Cheshire	Series 3 (3 episodes)
