= Criminal Record (TV series) =

2024 British thriller series

- Promotional poster
- Genre: Crime thriller
- Created by: Paul Rutman
- Starring: Peter Capaldi; Cush Jumbo; Zoë Wanamaker; Charlie Creed-Miles; Cathy Tyson; Stephen Campbell Moore; Shaun Dooley; Lyndsey Marshal; Dustin Demri-Burns; Luther Ford; Luke Pasqualino; Peter Sullivan
- Music by: Neil Davidge; Michael Asante
- Country of origin: United Kingdom
- Original language: English
- No. of series: 2
- No. of episodes: 16

Production
- Executive producers: Paul Rutman; Elaine Collins; Peter Capaldi; Cush Jumbo; Chris Sussman
- Production location: London
- Cinematography: Laurent Barès; Jan Jonaeus; Ben Wheeler
- Running time: 37–54 minutes
- Production companies: Tod Productions; STV Studios

Original release
- Network: Apple TV+
- Release: 10 January – 21 February 2024
- Network: Apple TV
- Release: 22 April 2026 – present

Criminal Record is a British crime thriller television series created by Paul Rutman starring Peter Capaldi and Cush Jumbo. The first series, consisting of eight episodes, premiered on Apple TV+ on 10 January 2024. The second series was released on 22 April 2026.

== Premise ==
Two detectives, one a seasoned veteran and the other early in her career, clash on an old murder case after an anonymous phone call draws them to it.

== Cast ==
=== Main ===
- Peter Capaldi as DCI Daniel Hegarty
- Cush Jumbo as DS/DI June Lenker
- Zoë Wanamaker as Maureen Lenker (series 1)
- Charlie Creed-Miles as DS Tony Gilfoyle
- Cathy Tyson as Doris Mathis (series 1)
- Stephen Campbell Moore as Leo Hanratty
- Shaun Dooley as DS Kim Cardwell
- Lyndsey Marshal as AC Ivy Mullins (series 2)
- Dustin Demri-Burns as Cosmo Thompson (series 2)
- Luther Ford as Billy Fielding (series 2)
- Luke Pasqualino as Jean-Paul "JP" Brownlee (series 2)
- Peter Sullivan as CTC Tim Dencik (series 2)

=== Recurring ===
- Dionne Brown as DC Chloe Summers
- Tom Moutchi as Errol Mathis
- Aysha Kala as Sonya Singh
- Jordan Nash as Jacob
- Steffan Cennydd as DC Jed Stanning
- Georgina Rich as ACC Claudia Mayhew
- Rasaq Kukoyi as Patrick Burrowes
- Maisie Ayres as Lisa Hegarty
- Moe Bar-El as Finn (series 2)
- Ceara Coveney as Jen (series 2)

=== Guest ===
- Kerrie Hayes as Jenny Whitlow
- Paul Thornley as Stefan Ash
- Steffan Cennydd as DC Jed Stanning
- Chizzy Akudolu as Jasmine Peters
- Carolina Main as DI Diana Markham
- Andrew Brooke as Clive Silcox
- Anna Wilson-Jones as Hester Ash
- Francis Lovehall as Jason Reeve
- Pippa Nixon as Ivy

== Episodes ==
| Series | Episodes | Originally released | | |
| Series | Episodes | First released | Last released | Network |
|---|---|---|---|---|
| 1 | 8 | 10 January 2024 | 21 February 2024 | Apple TV+ |
| 2 | 8 | 22 April 2026 | 10 June 2026 | Apple TV |

=== Series 1 (2024) ===
| No. overall | No. in season | Title | Directed by | Written by | Original release date |
|---|---|---|---|---|---|
| 1 | 1 | "Emergency Caller" | Jim Loach | Paul Rutman | 10 January 2024 |
| 2 | 2 | "Two Calls" | Jim Loach | Paul Rutman | 10 January 2024 |
| 3 | 3 | "Kid in the Park" | Jim Loach | Paul Rutman | 17 January 2024 |
| 4 | 4 | "Protected" | Jim Loach | Ameir Brown | 24 January 2024 |
| 5 | 5 | "Possession with Intent" | Shaun James Grant | Natasha Narayan | 31 January 2024 |
| 6 | 6 | "Beehive" | Shaun James Grant | Thomas Eccleshare | 7 February 2024 |
| 7 | 7 | "The Sixty-Twos" | Shaun James Grant | Paul Rutman | 14 February 2024 |
| 8 | 8 | "Carla" | Shaun James Grant | Paul Rutman | 21 February 2024 |

=== Series 2 (2026) ===
| No. overall | No. in season | Title | Directed by | Written by | Original release date |
|---|---|---|---|---|---|
| 9 | 1 | "Is It Him?" | Ben A. Williams | Paul Rutman | 22 April 2026 |
| 10 | 2 | "Firestarters" | Ben A. Williams | Paul Rutman | 29 April 2026 |
| 11 | 3 | "Snakes and Ladders" | Ben A. Williams | Thomas Eccleshare | 6 May 2026 |
| 12 | 4 | "Safe" | Ben A. Williams | Natasha Narayan | 13 May 2026 |
| 13 | 5 | "Duty of Care" | Joelle Mae David | Paul Rutman | 20 May 2026 |
| 14 | 6 | "When the Music Stops" | Joelle Mae David | Paul Rutman | 27 May 2026 |
| 15 | 7 | "Going Down" | Joelle Mae David | Thomas Eccleshare | 3 June 2026 |
| 16 | 8 | "Nobody Dies" | Joelle Mae David | Paul Rutman | 10 June 2026 |

== Production ==
It was announced in June 2022 that Apple TV+ had ordered the series, which had begun production in London, with Peter Capaldi and Cush Jumbo starring. Paul Rutman was announced as writer, while Jim Loach and Shaun James Grant were named as directors. Additional casting was revealed in August 2022.

In February 2024, it was reported that a second series was in the works. An official renewal was announced on 22 August. Filming for the second series took place at the Wharf Studios in London for soundstage filming along with central London filming locations. The shoot took 22 weeks and concluded on 20 June 2025.

On 28 January 2026, Dustin Demri-Burns, Luke Pasqualino, Luther Ford, Lyndsey Marshal, and Peter Sullivan were announced to have joined the cast for the second series.

== Release ==
The first two episodes of the first series premiered on 10 January 2024 on Apple TV+.

The second series premiered on 22 April 2026, followed by weekly releases until the series finale on 10 June 2026.

== Reception ==
=== Critical response ===
Critical response of Criminal Record
| Series | Rotten Tomatoes | Metacritic |
|---|---|---|
| 1 | 90% (49 reviews) | 74 (20 reviews) |
| 2 | 92% (12 reviews) | —N/a |

On the review aggregator Rotten Tomatoes, the first series holds a 90% approval rating, with an average of 7.8/10, based on 49 critic reviews. The website's critics consensus reads, "With the formidable pairing of Cush Jumbo and Peter Capaldi providing a scintillating focal point, Criminal Record is a mystery that only gets more intriguing as it unfolds." On Metacritic, the series has a weighted average score of 74 out of 100 based on 20 critics, indicating "generally favorable" reviews.

The second series has an 92% approval rating on Rotten Tomatoes based on 12 reviews. The website's critical consensus reads, "A darker and more expansive chapter, Criminal Record season 2 trades mystery for moral complexity without losing the tension that made the series stand out."
