= Ash Nair =

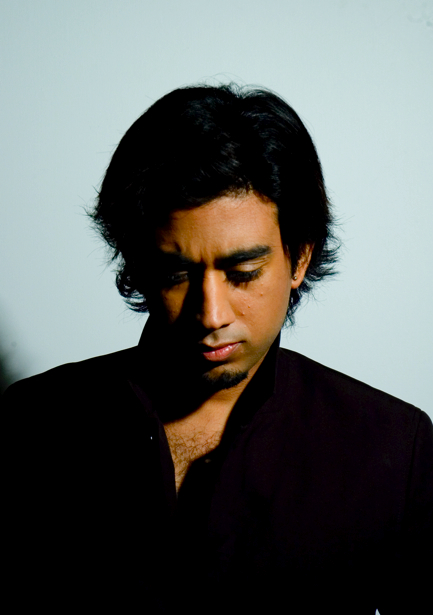

Background information
- Birth name: Ashvin Kumar Nair
- Born: 26 June 1980 (age 45)
- Origin: Ipoh, Perak, Malaysia
- Genres: Pop rock
- Occupation(s): Actor, Director & Musician
- Years active: 2005–present
- Website: www.twitter.com/ashnair

Ashvin Kumar Nair, commonly known as Ash, is a Malaysian alternative musician and former contestant of season 2 of Malaysian Idol, where he first became widely known to the public. Since his debut he is also widely known as actor and director with over 50 credits to his name. He starred for 2 seasons in the British-America TV series Indian Summers from the producers of Downton Abbey. He has also gone on to write and direct his own short-films and the 4 part web-series Legend.

== Malaysian Idol ==
Ash was first introduced to the Malaysian audience by becoming one of the 11 finalists on the 2nd season of Malaysian Idol, which was aired on 8TV and TV3 in 2005 with much publicity. After attaining the 4th runner-up position on the highly popular reality television show, Ash hit the studios with AIM- and ARIA-winning record producer Greg Henderson in hopes of showcasing his music and song-writing capabilities.

Blending modern rock sensibilities, dynamic arrangements and memorable melodies, Ash Nair hopes to captivate the ears and hearts of music lovers alike with his blend of pop rock with the release of his debut album aptly titled Chameleon, a label he acquired while on Malaysian Idol.

== Career ==
Ash Nair premiered his new sound to the Malaysian audience with the introduction of his chart-topping debut single 'A Day Before Tomorrow' that managed to reach number #1 on the XFresh charts for several weeks and subsequently gained heavy rotation on Fly FM and Hitz.fm.

Next, Ash took it a step further by collaborating with Hue Visualabs to produce a high concept treatment for his first music video. Taking a total of 5 months to produce, the team at Hue Visualabs did not disappoint. Comprising stunning animations and breathtaking visuals, the video for A Day Before Tomorrow picked up an AIM nomination for Best Music Video.

Ash Nair's debut album, titled Chameleon, consists of ten tracks, two in Bahasa Malaysia and the rest in English. Two tracks off his debut album were engineered, mixed by JD from Pop Shuvit and co-produced by JD and Ash Nair. Local heavyweights Jamie Wilson, Rudy & JD from Pop Shuvit and virtuoso sitar player Sam have contributed playing on several tracks.

Chameleon was a critical hit that gained several nominations in recent awards; 3 AIM & 5 MACP nods.

Nair launched 'Crazy' on Fly FM and Hitz.fm, which also comes with a Malay version ('Rindu') co-produced with fellow Malaysian Idol alumnus Faizull. The music video for this song also featured Canadian rapper MC Vandal, Moots! from Pop Shuvit, Harith Iskandar, Chelsia Ng and Vanessa Chong (sister of Vince Chong and The Amazing Race Asia participant).

=== Musical ===
Nair ventured into film by starring in a locally produced independent film noir-musical titled Red Street Diner. He had been involved in performing in stage performances such as Frogway the Musical and Kam...In Your Face.

=== Acting ===
Ash then starred as one of the 3 main leads in the NTV7 comedy 'Small Mission Enterprise' (SME) as Mohan, a budding entrepreneur on a quest looking for the 'one'. SME is currently in its third season. Ash also acted in CUAK, a locally produced independent feature film produced by Garang pictures which were co-directed by 5 local directors. Ash starred in Khai Bahars segment titled 'Bachelor Party'.

In 2015, Ash was seen in the British Television series Indian Summers which debuted on Channel 4 and PBS (USA). The show is set in Simla, India, during the British colonial rule in the 1930s and also starred Julie Walters (Harry Potter) and Henry-Lloyd Hughes (Killing Eve).

=== Awards ===
Ash was awarded AUGUSTMAN's Men of The Year in 2015 for his achievement in the arts.
