= Trigger Point (TV series) =

British crime thriller series

- Promotional poster for the first series
- Genre: Action; Crime thriller; Drama
- Created by: Daniel Brierley
- Written by: Daniel Brierley; Chris Brandon
- Directed by: Gilles Bannier; Jon East; Jamie Donoughue; Jennie Darnell
- Starring: Vicky McClure
- Composer: Chris Roe
- Country of origin: United Kingdom
- Original language: English
- No. of series: 4
- No. of episodes: 24

Production
- Executive producers: Jed Mercurio; Mark Redhead; Vicky McClure; Daniel Walker; Jessica Sharkey
- Producers: Julia Stannard; Mat Chaplin; Kristian Dench; Kingsley Hoskins
- Running time: 60 minutes
- Production company: HTM Television

Original release
- Network: ITV; ITVX
- Release: 23 January 2022 – present

Trigger Point is a British crime thriller television series starring Vicky McClure as a police bomb disposal expert in London. It was created and written by Daniel Brierley, and first broadcast on 23 January 2022 on ITV.

A second series began broadcasting on 28 January 2024, and a third was released on ITVX on 26 October 2025. A fourth series was released on 30 August 2026.

== Plot ==
Lana Washington is an ex-military bomb disposal operative (known as an 'Expo') and Afghan War veteran who heads a Metropolitan Police bomb squad, using her skills to counter terrorist threats involving explosives.

== Cast ==
- Vicky McClure as EXPO Lana “Wash” Washington
- Nabil Elouahabi as EXPO Hassan “Hass” Rahim
- Eric Shango as EXPO Danny Markham
- Kerry Godliman as Dr Sonya Reeves
- Natalie Simpson as DS Helen Morgan (series 2–)
- Maisie Ayres as EXPO Wren Cheshire (series 3–)
- Christopher Hatherall as CTSFO Phil Croxley (series 3–)
- Mark Stanley as DI/DCI Thom Youngblood (series 1-2)
- Adrian Lester as EXPO Joel “Nut” Nutkins (series 1)
- Kevin Eldon as Jeff Washington (series 1-3)
- Tamzin Griffin as Val Washington (series 1-3)
- Ewan Mitchell as Billy Washington (series 1)
- Kris Hitchen as EXPO John Hudson (series 1-2)
- Cal MacAninch as Inspector Lee Robins (series 1)
- Warren Brown as Karl Maguire (series 1)
- Nadine Marshall as DSupt Marianne Hamilton (series 1)
- Manjinder Virk as DI Samira Desai (series 1)
- Ralph Ineson as Commander Bregman (series 1)
- Maanuv Thiara as DI/DCI Amar Batra (series 2-4)
- Julian Ovenden as Commander John Francis (series 2 & 4)
- Tom Glenister as DC Neil Brenton (series 3-4)
- Mark Rowley as EXPO Rich Manning (series 3)
- Jason Flemyng as Stephen Wyles (series 3)
- Julie Graham as Commander Nia Quentin (series 4)
- Michael Balogun as Andy Oldfield, MI5 (series 4)
- Posy Sterling as DC Ellie Hackett (series 4)
- Jonas Armstrong as Sebastian Pinchbeck (series 4)
- Chris Reilly as Eddie (series 4)

== Production ==
Executive producer Jed Mercurio developed the series with Brierly during a television bursary scheme, where he also served as his mentor. Brierly, who was relatively new to television outside of some development deals and a trial script on Red Rock, had previously written short films and plays, as well as commercials. The series was filmed in London.

== Episodes ==
=== Series overview ===
Series	Episodes	Originally released		Average UK viewers (millions)
Series	Episodes	First released	Last released	Average UK viewers (millions)
1	6	23 January 2022	27 February 2022	7.80
2	6	28 January 2024	3 March 2024	6.86
3	6	26 October 2025	10 November 2025	6.74
4	6	30 August 2026	14 September 2026	5.85

=== Series 1 (2022) ===
No.	Title	Directed by	Written by	Original release date	UK viewers (millions)
1	"Episode 1"	Gilles Bannier	Daniel Brierley	23 January 2022	8.85
In the middle of a summer heatwave, Explosives Officers ("EXPO") Lana Washington and Joel Nutkins are called out to a Metropolitan Police counterterrorism operation at a London housing estate to investigate a potential bomb factory. There is no sign of the bomb maker but with evidence of an even deadlier terrorist threat, Lana and Joel must work against the clock to save as many lives as possible. The first bomb is revealed to be simple fireworks in the toilet of a flat. The second is found on Andy Phelan in the boot of his car. Lana and Joel manage to disarm this bomb manually. Joel assists in investigating a suspicious parked van, which detonates, hiding a third bomb; Joel and several bystanders are killed.
2	"Episode 2"	Gilles Bannier	Daniel Brierley	30 January 2022	7.71
Four days after the bombing at the housing estate, Lana and Danny respond to a suspected bomb on a bus, which turns out to be a false alarm. Following Joel's funeral, Lana and her colleagues drink away their sorrows. New reports of a bombing points the police to an abandoned factory, which they discover is used as a bomb factory. Lana suspects some wires to have been planted, while Youngblood advises her to tread carefully. Far right extremists take to the street and blame Islamists for the bombing. This later proves unfounded as a bomb is discovered at a mosque. The countdown is already at five minutes when Lana goes in to defuse it. She also discovers someone behind the door the bomb is attached to. With three minutes left on the timer, Youngblood rushes in and orders her to leave the mosque. She faces the dilemma of saving the man behind the door or leaving immediately.
3	"Episode 3"	Gilles Bannier	Daniel Brierley	6 February 2022	6.95
With seconds left on the bomb's timer, Lana desperately attempts to unlock the door. Danny rushes in when it hits 20 seconds and convinces her to get out before it detonates, killing the captured man. Lana shares her experience with her friend, Karl. She also has an outburst at one of her colleagues, John Hudson, blaming him for not getting backup. The police investigate a cryptic message left by a right-wing splinter group, The Crusaders, which claims responsibility for the mosque bombing. Lana and Sonya discover that the bomb material is highly classified, and the former asks Youngblood to look into it. Another bomb is discovered outside an LGBT bar, The Five Oaks. With smoke grenades as a distraction against a sniper, Lana and Danny manage to disarm the bomb. Armed police storm the block of flats where the sniper was located, but only manage to kill the bomber, Nic Roberts. An officer is killed by a second suspect, having just discovered a police vest. Lana suspects that the second suspect is an insider, and even floats the possibility of a third suspect, a bomb maker. She breaks into Hudson's locker, and discovers a map book marked with the locations of the bombings.
4	"Episode 4"	Jennie Darnell	Daniel Brierley	13 February 2022	7.42
The police discover the burned out remains of the Prius that the bomber stole. Lana presents the evidence from Hudson's locker to Youngblood, who promises to look into it. Her brother Billy misses a meeting with the police, and she starts looking for him. She and her parents discover his flat is empty. Lana takes her suspicions against John to the next level when she directly accuses him at New Scotland Yard, leading to DSU Marianne Hamilton asking her to take leave. Shortly afterwards, she is brought back in again after Commander Bregman informs her that her brother has ties with The Crusaders and Roberts. Billy discovers a bomb in his glovebox when Lana contacts him. She directs him away from an Underground station and into Cranstead Fields. Reinforcements arrive, and Lana attempts to defuse the bomb. With the timer activated, Billy starts to panic when it counts down from 30 seconds. Despite Lana's warnings, he opens the door, leading to the bomb detonating and killing him.
5	"Episode 5"	Jennie Darnell	Daniel Brierley	20 February 2022	7.61
Lana spends time grieving Billy's death, and tries to drink away her sorrows and eventually decides to start therapy on the advice of Hamilton. She also tackles a conflicting statement with Youngblood regarding whom she was with just before being called by the police. Another bomb is discovered at the University of South London, which is hosting a debate for a by-election. Lana goes in with Hudson to disarm the bomb. In the meantime, armed police spot the bomber, Frank Welsh, with two phones to detonate the bomb. They're authorised to shoot him. As Hudson leaves, he detonates the bomb via his phone, and escapes. Evidence from his home leads them to another bomb at a "progressive alliance" office, with a bomb located in a nearby car. Lana discovers gas triggers at the office, planted there and in the surrounding houses.
6	"Episode 6"	Jennie Darnell	Daniel Brierley	27 February 2022	8.24
The bomb is defused. Hamilton takes Lana in as an adviser for the investigation, just as Hudson makes contact via text message, sending her the numbers 661142. They discover the location from which the text message was sent matches the location of an MOD black site that stores explosives of the same kind used in the prior attacks. The police secure Deptford Town Hall after deducing that the attacks targeted the campaign in the by-election. Hudson's unconscious body is discovered in St Jude's chapel. As the Labour candidate is declared the by-election winner, Lana's friend Karl Maguire takes the stage and reveals that he has a bomb. He reveals his intentions as revenge for the coverup of an ambush in Afghanistan back in 2009. The Labour candidate, Ayesha Campbell-Khan, was the chair of the Defence Select Committee at the time; Maguire blames her for the coverup. Lana manages to talk to Maguire as SCO19 find positions. One of them manages to get a shot on Maguire, killing him. Hudson reawakens, his motive for marking the bombing locations revealed to be to become a senior like Lana. Her team is called into preliminary hearings after the incident.

=== Series 2 (2024) ===
No.	Title	Directed by	Written by	Original release date	UK viewers (millions)
1	"Episode 1"	Jon East	Simon Ashdown & Daniel Brierley	28 January 2024	6.36
2	"Episode 2"	Jon East	Simon Ashdown & Daniel Brierley	4 February 2024	6.55
3	"Episode 3"	Audrey Cooke	Simon Ashdown	11 February 2024	6.66
4	"Episode 4"	Jon East	Amanda Duke	18 February 2024	6.91
5	"Episode 5"	Audrey Cooke	Amanda Duke	25 February 2024	7.38
6	"Episode 6"	Audrey Cooke	Chris Brandon & Amanda Duke	3 March 2024	7.27

=== Series 3 (2025) ===
No.	Title	Directed by	Written by	Original release date	UK viewers (millions)
1	"Episode 1"	Jamie Donoughue	Chris Brandon	26 October 2025	7.05
2	"Episode 2"	Jamie Donoughue	Chris Brandon	27 October 2025	6.79
3	"Episode 3"	Jamie Donoughue	Chris Brandon	2 November 2025	6.83
4	"Episode 4"	Audrey Cooke	Fflur Dafydd	3 November 2025	6.67
5	"Episode 5"	Audrey Cooke	Harlan Davies	9 November 2025	6.65
6	"Episode 6"	Audrey Cooke	Chris Brandon	10 November 2025	6.45

=== Series 4 (2026) ===
No.	Title	Directed by	Written by	Original release date	UK viewers (millions)
1	"Episode 1"	Jennie Darnell	Chris Brandon	30 August 2026	5.91
Acting on intelligence from a STRAP 3 MI5 source, Washington’s team and CTSFOs pursue a suspected explosive equipped truck heading to the Bank of England. SO15 orchestrates road closures, directing the truck into a tunnel out of sight of a drone monitoring it. CTSFOs remove the driver, allowing Rahim to take his place and Washington to enter, resuming the route so the drone operators do not become suspicious. She discovers the bomb is linked to a satellite phone, rendering their radio jamming useless. Whilst searching an address linked to the driver, DS Morgan fails to call it in and DCI Batra is killed by an explosive booby trap. Morgan takes the SD card from her body camera and fakes injuries. Hassan disobeys orders from Commander Quentin to change direction, giving Washington enough time to defuse the device. The drone is shot down, but two more bombs immediately detonate in another part of the city. Some time later, Washington reluctantly undergoes treatment for PTSD with Eddie, a new therapist.
2	"Episode 2"	Jennie Darnell	Perrie Balthazar	31 August 2026	5.78
The two other targets are revealed to also be financial institutions, with RDX being the explosive used. Washington’s team locate the drone's origin point at a dockyard after extracting and analysing its flight data. They find it empty apart from Annie, a security guard, locked in a room wired with explosives. Washington disables the door IED and a secondary device attached to Annie’s body equipped with tilt switches. Morgan returns to SO15 headquarters and lies in her debrief to cover her tracks. The driver throws up when interviewed by DC Brenton and MI5 liaison officer Andy Oldfield. Due to the circumstances, Reeves suspects he may be carrying a form of chemical weapon and takes a sample. In Poplar, a man is kidnapped from his car and his bodyguards executed. Before fleeing, the attackers capture PC Wells, a probationary officer responding to the shooting, and leave him at the ambush site with a spring-loaded explosive in his mouth. Washington is forced to cut through his cheek with a scalpel to disarm it.
3	"Episode g3"	Jennie Darnell	Amanda Duke	6 September 2026	5.97
Activist Leonora Hoyle is linked to the mouth bomb via a partial fingerprint, but Washington’s team finds her dead after raiding her workplace. They also find schematics for undetectable bombs intended for the headquarters of MI6, MI5 and SO15. An evacuation is initiated, which includes a server switch to backup data, rendering SO15 vulnerable and allowing bombs planted in Morgan and Quentin’s cars that have already entered the premises undetected to be activated. The two are trapped when leaving for a COBRA meeting. Washington disarms the bomb in Morgan’s car, but the other in Quentin’s detonates, killing her. Morgan calls Sebastian Pinchbeck, the leader of the terrorists who has her brother hostage, demanding proof he is still alive or she will try to stop him. Reeves has the UKHSA analyse the vomit samples, and discovers the driver had radiation sickness from handling large amounts of uranium 235. She informs Washington. The kidnapped man, Callum Schroder, is forced by Pinchbeck to build a nuclear bomb.
4	"Episode 4"	Nirpal Bhogal	Chris Brandon	7 September 2026	5.86
John Francis returns as Acting Commander to replace Quentin. As the amounts of uranium involved suggest a foreign state involvement, MI5 take over the investigation. This causes tension between Oldfield and Francis, who disobeys orders and has SO15 track Schroder’s location via ANPR and facial recognition traffic cameras to an airfield. Washington’s team and CTSFOs find a helicopter with the pilot still inside rigged with explosives. The pilot says he was hired to fly in a case from France, and a Geiger counter confirms radioactive material was present. Washington defuses the bomb on the pilot, but whilst searching another part of the airfield, Hassan is seriously injured by an explosion activated by a photodetector trigger. The pilot says he heard one of the men speaking Farsi, leading MI5 to suspect Iran. However, Washington discovers the pilot’s bomb was a decoy, indicating he was kept alive to convey information falsely implicating the Iranians. Morgan hides a tracker in her bra and meets with Pinchbeck.
5	"Episode 5"	Nirpal Bhogal	Chris Brandon	13 September 2026	5.73
SO15 identifies Pinchbeck as a mercenary, and work on determining who hired him to conduct the proxy warfare. Eddie suggests that leaving EOD is the only way Washington will be able to manage her PTSD. Pinchbeck gives Morgan proof of life, but takes her hostage also. Concerned when she misses work, Brenton locates her using the Bluetooth tracker missing from her keys. He witnesses Pinchbeck and his men preparing a fake police van, but is shot dead. Washington and Danny find his body, and lead CTSFOs to a building Pinchbeck is holding Morgan in. There is enough room for Washington to crawl under an electronic tripwire, but the CTSFOs can’t due to their gear. The other PMCs dress as TSG officers, jam police radios and infiltrate a stadium hosting a US-UK football match using Morgan’s authorisation code. Morgan is able to incapacitate Pinchbeck and escapes with his gun. Washington tortures Pinchbeck, who claims the United States hired him to carry out the false flag attack before killing himself.
6	"Episode 6"	Nirpal Bhogal	Chris Brandon	14 September 2026	5.85
Washington enters the stadium with CTSFOs led by Phil Croxley, ordering Danny not to accompany her and leave the blast radius should she fail. Francis doesn't order an evacuation, knowing it would disrupt the search. The Prime Minister scrambles RAF Typhoon’s to bomb the stadium and stop the detonation as a last resort. CTSFOs engage the PMC’s so Washington can find the bomb, with Croxley giving her a pistol. Morgan rescues her brother and finds out the bomb's location, conveying it to Washington. The Chief of Defence Staff orders the fighters commence bombing ten minutes before detonation, giving Washington just six minutes. Out of detonators, she uses the primer from a disassembled 9mm round to detonate plastic explosive and break the device in half, but is shot by a sniper. Croxley kills the sniper, the device is neutralised and the strike aborted at the last second. Washington survives her injuries and helps Oldfield to track down and arrest Morgan in France. Formally resigning from EOD with a recovered Hassan taking her place, Washington begins a road trip with her new pet dog, seemingly more at peace.

== Reception ==
Lucy Mangan for The Guardian gave the first episode three out of five, remarking, "It's great fun as long as you set your preposterousness levels to 'high'. Go in thinking CSI: Peckham or Line of Bomb Duty or Bomby McBombface, rather than The Wire But with Actual Wires or Breaking Explosively Badly and you'll enjoy yourself a lot more." Ed Cumming of The Independent also gave it three out five, praising the tension but finding the dialogue and storytelling melodramatic.

Reviews for later series were more positive. Christopher Stevens for the Daily Mail gave the fourth series four out of five, commenting that "the sheer velocity of the plotting makes it impossible to look away". Digital Spy also gave the fourth series four out of five, adding that the series's willingness to dig deeper into its characters, particularly Lana and Morgan, would leave viewers "more gripped than ever". Carol Midgley of The Times also noted improvements in the dialogue in series three.

=== Accolades ===
Year	Award	Category	Nominee(s)	Result	Ref.
2022	National Television Awards	Drama Performance	Vicky McClure	Nominated	
2022	National Television Awards	New Drama	Trigger Point	Winner	
2024	National Television Awards	Drama Performance	Vicky McClure	Nominated	
2024	National Television Awards	Returning Drama	Trigger Point	Nominated	
2026	National Television Awards	Drama Performance	Vicky McClure	Winner	
2026	National Television Awards	Returning Drama	Trigger Point	Nominated	
