= Paul Rutman =

British writer and producer

Paul Rutman is a British screenwriter and producer. He is known for the historical Channel 4 drama Indian Summers, and has written multiple episodes of the ITV crime drama Vera. He also wrote the Apple TV+ crime drama series Criminal Record, starring Peter Capaldi and Cush Jumbo. The first series premiered on 10 January 2024, and the second series aired from 22 April 2026.

== Filmography ==
Year	Title	Writer	Producer	Creator	Notes
2002	The Secret	No	Yes	No	
2003	Without You	No	Yes	No	
2005	Mr. Harvey Lights a Candle	No	Yes	No	
2006	The Virgin Queen	No	Yes	No	
2007	Five Days	No	Yes	No	
2008	Inspector Lewis	Yes	No	No	2 episodes
2008	New Tricks	Yes	No	No	1 episode
2008	Lark Rise to Candleford	Yes	Yes	No	1 episode
2008–2009	Inspector Lewis	Yes	No	No	2 episodes
2009–2010	Agatha Christie's Marple	Yes	No	No	2 episodes
2010	The Deep	Yes	No	No	(TV Mini-Series) 1 episode
2011–2014	Vera	Yes	No	No	8 episodes
2015-2016	Indian Summers	Yes	Yes	Yes	10 episodes
2018	Next of Kin	Yes	Yes	Yes	
2024	Criminal Record	Yes	Yes	Yes	

== Awards and nominations ==
=== BAFTA Awards ===
- 2008: Nominated, BAFTA TV Award for Best Drama Series, for Five Days (2007); shared with: Gwyneth Hughes, Simon Curtis, and Otto Bathurst
- 2007 Nominated, BAFTA TV Award for Best Drama Series, for The Virgin Queen (2005); shared with: Coky Giedroyc and Paula Milne

=== Other awards ===
- 2008 Nominated, Banff Rockie Award for Best Mini-Series, Banff Television Festival, for Five Days (2007); shared with: Gwyneth Hughes, Simon Curtis, and Otto Bathurst
- 2008 Nominated, Broadcasting Press Guild Award for Best Drama Series, for Five Days (2007); shared with: Gwyneth Hughes, Simon Curtis, and Otto Bathurst
