= Get Away (film) =

2024 film by Steffen Haars

- US theatrical release poster
- Directed by: Steffen Haars
- Written by: Nick Frost
- Produced by: John Hegeman; Lee Kim; Nick Frost; Nick Spicer; Maxime Cottray; Aram Tertzakian
- Starring: Nick Frost; Aisling Bea; Sebastian Croft; Maisie Ayres
- Cinematography: Joris Kerbosch
- Edited by: Brian Ent
- Music by: Hybrid
- Production companies: XYZ Films; Wayward Entertainment
- Distributed by: Sky
- Release dates: 20 September 2024 (Fantastic Fest); 10 January 2025 (United Kingdom)
- Running time: 86 minutes
- Country: United Kingdom
- Language: English
- Box office: $179,897

Get Away is a 2024 British comedy horror film directed by Steffen Haars and written by Nick Frost, who stars alongside Aisling Bea, Sebastian Croft, and Maisie Ayres. The film premiered at Fantastic Fest on 20 September 2024 and was released in the United Kingdom on the subscription service Sky Cinema on 10 January 2025.

== Premise ==
A family on holiday in Sweden travels to a remote island to take part in a peculiar holiday tradition.

200 years prior, the island of Svalta was put under quarantine by the British and left to starve out (except for those who resorted to cannibalism). In the present day, a family of four travel to the island for a holiday to witness a play retelling the island's history. They are met with hostility, and it is implied that the islanders will sacrifice and eat the family. But there is something not quite right about the family. They are hesitant to give their names, the teenage children are unperturbed by a decapitated bird, the daughter seems to know very little about the brother, and the daughter feeds into the predatory proclivities of their neighbour. It is revealed halfway through that the "family" are an unrelated group of psychopaths that have come to Svalta on a "slaycation"—their intent being to massacre the entire island and therefore continue what the English started 200 years ago.

== Cast ==
- Nick Frost as Richard
- Aisling Bea as Susan
- Sebastian Croft as Sam
- Maisie Ayres as Jessie
- Eero Milonoff as Mats

== Production ==
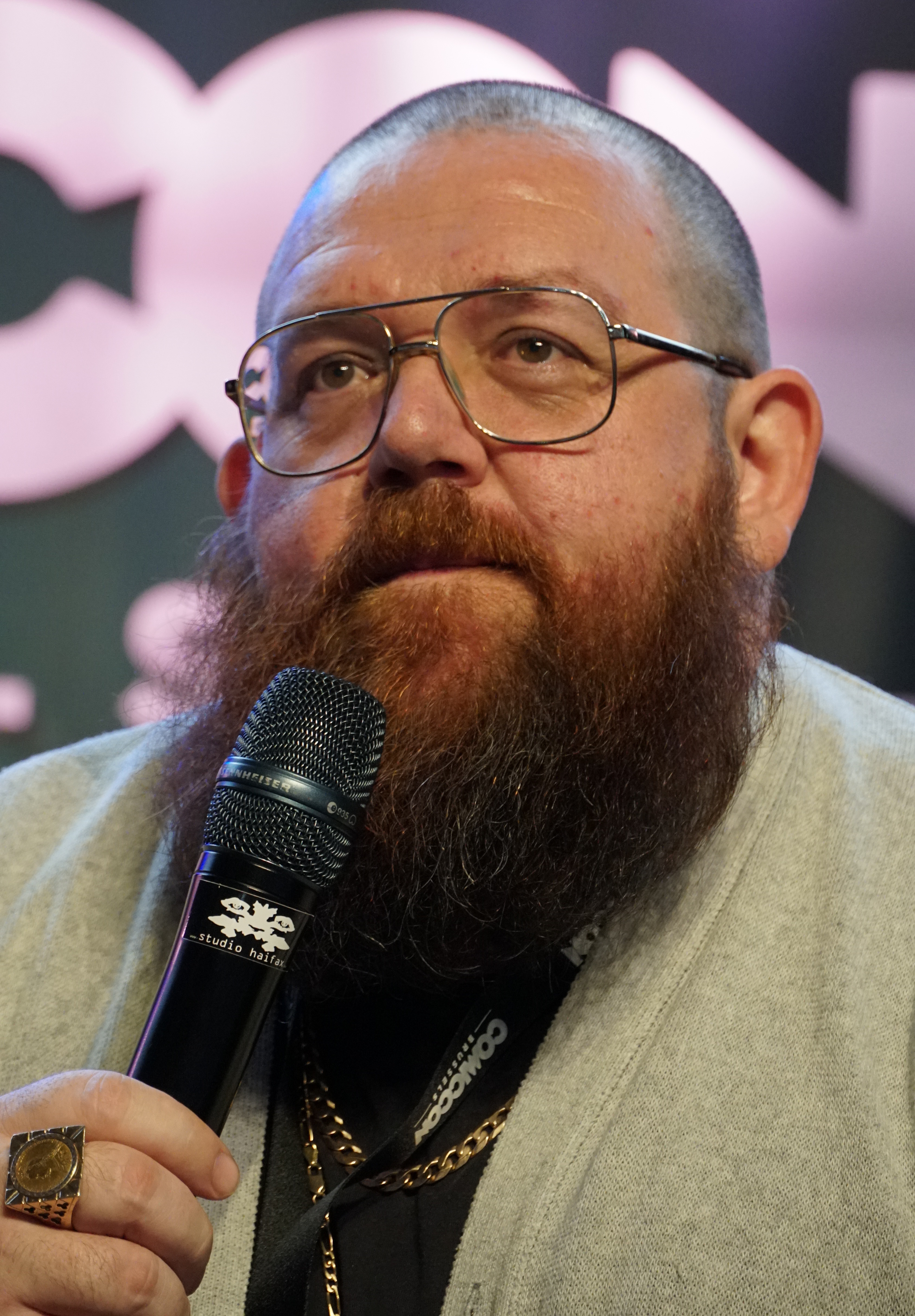
Get Away was Nick Frost's first solo writing effort.

In June 2019, Orion Pictures acquired the pitch for the horror film Svalta from the production company Stolen Picture led by Simon Pegg, Nick Frost and Miles Ketley, with the three producing for Orion and Frost writing the screenplay with Stolen Picture creative directors James Serafinowicz and Nat Saunders. In August 2021, former Orion Pictures CEO John Hegeman founded Wayward Entertainment, with the company's first project set to be Svalta. In September 2022, Frost and Lena Headey were cast in lead roles, marking their second film together after Fighting with My Family (2019). The film was to be directed by filmmaking duo Steffen Haars and Flip van der Kuil, with producers from Wayward Entertainment, Resolute Films, Film Service Finland, and XYZ Films. In November 2023, the film wrapped production in Tampere, Finland. Aisling Bea replaced Headey due to a scheduling conflict and Haars directed alone. Post-production was completed in the United Kingdom.

== Release ==
In August 2024, the film was retitled Get Away and acquired by IFC Films and Shudder (both divisions of AMC Networks), with a theatrical release in the United States and Canada on 6 December 2024. It premiered at Fantastic Fest on 20 September 2024 before streaming on Shudder in 2025. In the United Kingdom, the film was released on the subscription service Sky Cinema on 10 January 2025.

It was featured in the Limelight section of the 54th International Film Festival Rotterdam that screened in February 2025.

== Reception ==
On the review aggregator website Rotten Tomatoes, 76% of 51 critics' reviews are positive. The website's consensus reads: "Drawing blood and yucks from its literal tourist trap setting, Get Away is uneven as comedy and horror but makes for a highly unique blending of the two genres." Metacritic, which uses a weighted average, assigned the film a score of 58 out of 100, based on 10 critics, indicating "mixed or average" reviews.

Matt Donato of Collider described the film as "a deceptive blast that properly exploits vacationer stereotypes to conceal vastly more wicked intentions." He complimented the performances and humor but noted the story's length in reaching the climactic "pay-off". Bloody Disgusting's Trace Thurman was more mixed, concluding that it "gets by on the charms of its cast and an overall sense of demented glee, but it never aspires to be anything other than a frequently amusing diversion." Cath Clarke in The Guardian gave the film two stars but said that it was rescued by the "almighty twist and a demented finale".
