= Indian Summers =

British drama television series (2015–2016)

- Series title card
- Genre: Period drama
- Created by: Paul Rutman
- Starring: Henry Lloyd-Hughes; Nikesh Patel; Julie Walters; Patrick Malahide; Jemima West; Roshan Seth; Lillete Dubey; Aysha Kala
- Composer: Stephen Warbeck
- Country of origin: United Kingdom
- Original language: English
- No. of series: 2
- No. of episodes: 20

Production
- Executive producers: Charles Pattinson; Elaine Pyke; Paul Rutman; Simon Curtis; Rebecca Eaton
- Producer: Dan McCulloch
- Production locations: Penang, Malaysia
- Running time: 60 minutes
- Production companies: New Pictures; Little Island Productions; Masterpiece; Biscuit Films

Original release
- Network: Channel 4 PBS
- Release: 15 February 2015 – 15 May 2016

Indian Summers is a British drama television series that began airing on Channel 4 on 15 February 2015. The show details the events of summers spent at Simla (the summer capital of British India), in the foothills of the Himalayas, by a group of the British governing and trading community at the time of the British Raj. The first series is set in 1932. It was broadcast in several countries subsequently.

The show was renewed for a second and final series on 1 March 2015. The second and final series is set in 1935 and began airing on 13 March 2016. Although initially planned by producers for five series, on 25 April 2016 it was announced that the show would not be renewed for a third series due to poor ratings and strong competition in its timeslot.

== Cast ==
- Henry Lloyd-Hughes as Ralph Whelan
- Nikesh Patel as Aafrin Dalal
- Julie Walters as Cynthia Coffin
- Patrick Malahide as Lord Willingdon
- Jemima West as Alice Whelan
- Roshan Seth as Darius Dalal
- Lillete Dubey as Roshana Dalal
- Aysha Kala as Sooni Dalal
- Alexander Cobb as Ian McLeod
- Fiona Glascott as Sarah Raworth
- Craig Parkinson as Dougie Raworth
- Olivia Grant as Madeleine Mathers
- Amber Rose Revah as Leena Prasad
- Rick Warden as Ronnie Keane
- Tanmay Dhanania as Naseem Ali Khan
- Ashna Rabheru as Shamshad Dalal
- Indi Nadarajah as Kaiser
- Ash Nair as Bhupinder

=== Series 1 ===
- Ellora Torchia as Sita
- Edward Hogg as Eugene Mathers
- Alyy Khan as Ramu Sood
- Daniel Skitch as Shopkeeper
- Anthony Theil as The Coroner

=== Series 2 ===
- Art Malik as The Maharajah of Amritpur
- Rachel Griffiths as Sirene/Phyllis
- Sugandha Garg as Kaira Das
- Arjun Mathur as Naresh Banerjee
- Blake Ritson as Charlie Havistock

== Production ==
The series was filmed in Penang, Malaysia, as a stand-in for Simla. Simla was not chosen due to the large number of modern buildings and a monsoon season that would have interfered with filming. Shooting locations included Penang Hill and historic buildings in and around George Town, which share a similar British colonial architectural lineage.

== Episodes ==
=== Series 1 (2015) ===
No. overall	No. in season	Title	Directed by	Written by	Original release date	U.K. viewers (millions)
1	1	"Episode 1"	Anand Tucker	Paul Rutman	15 February 2015	4.82
Ralph Whelan and the rest of the Indian Civil Service begin the annual move to Simla, while doyenne of the social scene Cynthia Coffin prepares the exclusively white Royal Simla Club for the start of the summer season. The train to Simla is delayed, however, when a boy is found collapsed on the railway tracks, while a mysterious assassin makes his way to the city.
2	2	"Episode 2"	Anand Tucker	Paul Rutman	22 February 2015	3.40
The fallout from the shooting reverberates around Simla and a curfew is imposed to deal with the supposed terrorist threat, and the arrival of a journalist causes trouble for Ralph when he tries to uncover the truth behind the assassination attempt. Ian is shocked to learn of his uncle's financial difficulties, while Eugene and Cynthia conspire to push Madeleine and Ralph closer together. Sarah becomes suspicious of Alice's past and turns detective to find out why she really moved to India.
3	3	"Episode 3"	Anand Tucker	Nicole Taylor	1 March 2015	2.72
It's the Sipi Fair in Simla, the only time of the year the Indian community is allowed onto the grounds of the British Club. With the inquest looming, Ralph conspires to get Aafrin onside by granting him a highly sought-after promotion, while Cynthia's attempts to coerce Alice lead to further tension. Sooni finds herself in serious trouble when she's arrested at a pro-independence rally. Sarah decides to take control of her marriage by confronting Leena, while Armitage's attempts to ignore his growing debt crisis finally come to a head.
4	4	"Episode 4"	Anand Tucker	Paul Rutman	8 March 2015	2.23
There's much excitement in Simla as the Viceroy arrives for the first of his summer visits. Ralph is troubled when he discovers the only piece of evidence that linked Chandru Mohan to the Congress Party has gone missing. Aafrin finds himself in danger when he learns there will be a search of the properties of all those who had access to the stolen item. Ian is forced to grow up quickly when he receives sad news about his uncle, while Eugene threatens to return to Chicago with Madeleine. Sarah receives information from England that sheds light on Alice's mysterious past.
5	5	"Episode 5"	Jamie Payne	Paul Rutman	15 March 2015	2.11
Ralph tries to take advantage of divisions among the Indian communities. Cynthia is shocked by Eugene’s revelation about his finances. Sarah places Alice in a very difficult position.
6	6	"Episode 6"	Jamie Payne	Paul Rutman	22 March 2015	1.96
The pressure continues to mount on Ralph as Jaya reveals the real reason for her visit to Simla. A mountaineer saves Alice, Madeleine and Ronnie from a perilous situation.
7	7	"Episode 7"	Jamie Payne	Lisa McGee	29 March 2015	1.98
Simla is buzzing as it prepares for the annual amateur dramatic production, but the play is overshadowed by the news that a murder victim has been found in the river.
8	8	"Episode 8"	David Moore	Anna Symon	5 April 2015	1.84
The British community turn out in force for the murder trial. Ian is wracked with guilt about his part in Ramu's arrest and Leena is torn apart in the witness box.
9	9	"Episode 9"	David Moore	Paul Rutman	12 April 2015	1.59
Madeleine is dealt some devastating news, and Alice is terrified when Sarah threatens to tell everyone that Alice's husband is alive. Tensions between Ralph and Cynthia escalate.
10	10	"Episode 10"	David Moore	Paul Rutman	12 April 2015	1.83
Ramu Sood's fate is left in Ralph's hands, a vote takes place at the club to lift the colour bar, and Alice and Aafrin prepare to go public with their relationship.

=== Series 2 (2016) ===
On 1 March 2015, Channel 4 confirmed that Indian Summers would return for a second and final series in 2016, starring new cast members including Art Malik and Academy Award nominated Rachel Griffiths. The first episode aired on Sunday 13 March 2016. The 10-part series returns to Simla in the summer of 1935, three years after the events of the first series. Paul Rutman, creator and writer of the series, said: "Our story moves forward three years, to a Viceroy’s last summer, a political gamble to stifle Independence and a great reckoning for Ralph, Alice and Aafrin."

No. overall	No. in season	Title	Directed by	Written by	Original release date	U.K. viewers (millions)
11	1	"Indian Man, British Suit"	John Alexander	Paul Rutman	13 March 2016	1.987
The epic drama picks up in 1935. A terrorist attack against the British Viceroy of India puts Aafrin in the frame, while Cynthia urges Ralph to make a play for the top job.
12	2	"Black Kite"	John Alexander	Lisa McGee, Paul Rutman	20 March 2016	1.48
Aafrin's wounded comrade Naresh is convinced someone has betrayed him. As Aafrin struggles to contain him, he discovers the truth is darker and more dangerous than he knew.
13	3	"White Gods"	John Alexander	Paul Rutman	26 March 2016	1.31
Aafrin's troubles deepen as his personal and political worlds collide, while Ralph needs to befriend the slippery but powerful Maharajah of Patiala and his mistress Sirene.
14	4	"The Empty Chair"	Jonathan Teplitzky	Lisa McGee	3 April 2016	1.29
A fashion show at the club ends with a horrifying attack on one of the guests. Ralph plays detective to find the culprit, but the truth is worse than he could have imagined.
15	5	"Hide and Seek"	Jonathan Teplitzky	Paul Rutman	10 April 2016	1.47
Lord Hawthorne orders the police to arrest Adam and Ralph uncovers a shocking family secret. Alice decides to take a stand against her husband, and an earthquake hits Simla.
16	6	"A Gift for the King"	Jonathan Teplitzky	Paul Rutman	17 April 2016	1.38
As Simla gathers to celebrate King George's Silver Jubilee, Aafrin is trapped in a nightmare—the terrorist Naresh Banerjee is plotting a bomb strike at the picnic.
17	7	"The Proposal"	Paul Wilmshurst	Paul Rutman	24 April 2016	1.526
The Whelans' marriage faces its darkest hour as the Maharajah and Sirene return to Simla. Knowing Ralph needs his support, the Maharajah makes him an indecent proposal.
18	8	"The Birthday Party"	Paul Wilmshurst	Anna Symon	1 May 2016	1.34
Alice and Aafrin decide to flee Simla with Cynthia's help, but Charlie comes close to unveiling the truth, while Ian discovers some devastating information about Ramu Sood.
19	9	"Winner Takes All"	Paul Wilmshurst	Paul Rutman	8 May 2016	1.418
Ralph's life spirals out of control. The announcement of the new Viceroy leaves his ambitions in tatters, and he realises those closest have been conspiring behind his back.
20	10	"Leaving Home"	Paul Wilmshurst	Paul Rutman	15 May 2016	1.625
Alice and Charlie prepare to leave India for good. Ralph and Aafrin make momentous decisions about their careers. Cynthia is in a bidding war as Chotipool goes under the hammer.

== Reception ==
The first series of Indian Summers received largely positive reviews, gaining a score of 88% on Rotten Tomatoes. At the time, the first episode was Channel 4's highest rating original UK drama in over 20 years. After the first episode aired, The Times described the series as "A work of subtlety, intelligence and some beauty." The Independent wrote "Indian Summers is a fully immersive experience that plunges its audience headlong into 1930s Simla in British-ruled India." The Daily Express said "The opening did not disappoint." In the United States, the San Francisco Chronicle called the series "exemplary" and stated that Rutman had an "exquisite sense of character".

== International broadcast ==
Indian Summers premiered in the United States on PBS on 27 September 2015. It premiered in Australia on BBC First on 16 May 2015 while in New Zealand, it premiered on TVNZ TV One on 7 June 2015. In Estonia, the show premiered on Kanal 2 on 12 July 2015 and on SVT1 in Sweden on 20 June 2015. On 31 May 2015 it premiered on NRK1 in Norway. In Finland, the show premiered on Yle TV1 on 22 November 2017. In Germany and France, the TV premiere was on German-French Channel arte on 29. September 2016.
