= Stephen Churchett =

British actor (1947–2022)

- Born: Stephen George Churchett; 10 April 1947; Bromley, Kent, England
- Died: 11 January 2022 (aged 74)
- Occupations: Actor, writer
- Years active: 1969–2022
- Television: EastEnders; The Brittas Empire; The House of Eliott

Stephen George Churchett (10 April 1947 – 11 January 2022) was an English actor and writer.

== Life and career ==
One of his most notable roles was as solicitor Marcus Christie in EastEnders, on and off from 1990 to 2004. He reprised the role in 2014 and again in 2015.

He has also appeared in various television programmes, including The Brief, Together, Minder, Campion, Up Pompeii!, Enemy at the Door, Specials, The Professionals, C.A.T.S. Eyes, Lucan, Casualty, Moon and Son, Bugs, The House of Elliot, Peak Practice, Silent Witness, Dangerfield, Pie in the Sky, The Bill, Preston Front, Boon, Monroe, Dalziel and Pascoe and Porkpie. He also appeared in the Doctor Who episode titled Attack of the Cybermen in 1985.

He voiced Wing Commander Belfridge in the 'Allo 'Allo! episode titled "The Sausages in the Trousers". He appeared in various episodes of The Brittas Empire, as Councillor Jack Druggett.

He has written episodes of The Bill, Kavanagh QC, Inspector Morse, Dalziel and Pascoe, Monsignor Renard and Hornblower, as well as writing the screenplay for Lewis, and appeared in four Agatha Christie's Marple television adaptations as the Coroner (The Murder at the Vicarage, The Moving Finger, Murder Is Easy, Endless Night). In 1984, he appeared in Miss Marple as Major Reeve in The Body in the Library. HIs interest in writing about detection was evident from a 1978 letter he wrote to Special Branch enquiring about the conspiracy case against Alice Wheeldon and her family, and their reply. Anecdotally, he visited Derby with a view to writing a play.

Churchett died on 11 January 2022, at the age of 74.

== Partial filmography ==
| Year | Title | Role | Notes |
|---|---|---|---|
| 1971 | Bleak Moments | Remedial Trainee | |
| 1975 | Play for Today | History teacher | Episode: "After The Solo" |
| 1976 | Romeo & Juliet | Soldier of the Guard | Thames Television full-text production directed by Joan Kemp-Welch |
| 1977 | A Bridge Too Far | Soldier | |
| 1977 | A Christmas Carol | John | |
| 1980 | Enemy at the Door | Feldwebel | Episode: "The Raid" |
| 1980 | Play for Today | Dr. Lacey | Episode: "Minor Complications" |
| 1984 | Play for Today | Mr. Jessop | Episode: "Young Shoulders" |
| 1985 | Screen Two | Directorate Official | Episode: "In The Secret State" |
| 1985 | Number One | TV Announcer | Television film |
| 1985 | Florence Nightingale | Dr. Clark | |
| 1986 | Murrow | BBC Technician | |
| 1987 | Still Crazy like a Fox | Sergeant | |
| 1987 | Bellman and True | Commercial Traveller | |
| 1989 | Boon | Billy Hooper | Episode: "Of Meissen Men" |
| 1990–2004, 2014, 2023 | EastEnders | Marcus Christie | 73 episodes |
| 1991 | The Object of Beauty | Mr. Mundy | |
| 1991 | Minder | Head Waiter | Episode: "A Bird in the Hand is Worth Two in Shepherd's Bush" |
| 1992 – 1994 | The House of Eliott | Joseph Wint | |
| 1996 | Secrets & Lies | Men in Suits | |
| 1997 | Photographing Fairies | Mr. Dawson | |
| 1998 | Peak Practice | Mr. Anthony Millington | Episode: "Another Day of Life" |
| 1998 | McCallum | Humphrey Poole | Episodes: "Dead Man's Fingers" and "Running on Empty" |
| 1998 | Silent Witness | Charles | Episode: "Brothers in Arms" |
| 1998 | Dangerfield | Academic | Episode: "Harvest Time" |
| 1999 | Hunting Venus | Antiques Dealer | |
| 1999 | The Mystery of Men | Headmaster Haines | Television film |
| 2000 | Dalziel and Pascoe | DI Larkin | Episode: "Foreign Bodies" |
| 2002 | Before You Go | TV Priest | |
| 2005 | The Brief | Dr. Raeburn | Episode: "Lack of Affect" |
| 2013 | The Great Ghost Rescue | The Head Master | |
| 2013 | Lucan | Albert Hensby | TV mini-series |
| 2013 | Lewis | Professor Richard Seager | Episode: "Intelligent Design" |
| 2015 | Churchill: Winning the War, Losing the Peace | Lord Moran | Television film |

== Screenplays ==
Screenplays written by Stephen Churchett
| Date first broadcast | Title | Director | Cast | Synopsis Awards | Station Series |
|---|---|---|---|---|---|
| 6 August 1991 | The Bill: Getting Involved | Richard Holthouse | Graham Cole, Jeff Stewart and Trudie Goodwin | Stamp talks to a man about paint stripper on his car – the second time in a month. Hollis and Ackland are later called to an industrial estate where a man is damaging the car. | ITV |
| 8 March 1999 | Kavanagh QC: Previous Convictions | Tristram Powell | John Thaw | An RAF Jet Provost trainer crashes into a crowded moto-cross event killing 22 people. One of these is a friend of Kavanagh's son. The RAF Corporal responsible for maintenance commits suicide, pinning the blame on his lover, Charlotte Sinclair (Amanda Ryan). She is tried for theft and conspiracy to murder. Sabotage or human error? Kavanagh has to defend her and uncover documents initially denied to the Court. | ITV |
| 29 March 1999 | Kavanagh QC: End Game | Tristram Powell | John Thaw | In November 1985, a robbery at Turnbrook Services goes wrong and a pregnant teacher and young boy are killed. The following year, three men are sentenced to life imprisonment, with a minimum of between 15 and 23 years in jail. Kavanagh was a Junior for the flawed defence. The firer of the final shot commits suicide in 1992 leaving a note admitting one of the men was innocent. Hunger strikes and petitions to Home Secretaries follow. Finally, 12 years after the initial murder, Kavanagh and Miss Miller act for one of the men, Cracken, at his appeal. | ITV |
| 15 November 2000 | Inspector Morse: The Remorseful Day | Jack Gold | John Thaw and Kevin Whately | Yvonne Harrison is murdered in her bed and found by her husband Frank, her body having been left in a sexually compromising position. Morse, after no progress, is taken off the case after two months, and it remains unsolved. A year later an anonymous letter sent to the police suggests Harry Repp, who is to be released from prison, may be the perpetrator. Morse's failing health has Lewis assuming a more active role. | ITV |
| 25 April 2001 | Kavanagh QC: The End of Law | Jack Gold | John Thaw | Kavanagh is sitting as a Recorder at Southwark Crown Court. Lord Cranston (Nicholas Le Prevost) pops in for a conversation during a trial for shoplifting. Would he like to become a Judge? He asks Foxcott and his daughter for advice. Elsewhere, Aldermarten is prosecuting Harry Hatton (Robert Pickavance) for the murder of Katya Zimanyi (Rachel Woolrich), a Hungarian escort in the Mortimer Hotel. The defendant is served by Miss Swithen (Samantha Bond), a Solicitor Advocate. After losing the trial she asks Kavanagh for help with the appeal, but passes out after a diabetic attack. But Lord Cranston asks him not to get too involved – so of course he takes on the appeal. Soon a miscarriage of justice starts to look like a state cover-up involving the intelligence community. Kavanagh is given the alternatives of the appeal or being sworn in as a Judge. | ITV |
| 7 October 2002 | Dalziel and Pascoe: Mens Sana | Juliet May | Warren Clarke and Colin Buchanan | 73-year-old Mrs. Vannstone is found dead in a seaweed bath at a local spa. With Dalziel on a month's sick leave following his heart attack, it's left to Pascoe to deal with the case. Things look pretty straight forward, until the nurse who found the body supposedly commits suicide. Deciding it is time to return to work, Dalziel books himself a week at the spa in an attempt to find out the real goings on. And when another grisly murder occurs, he realises that certain people claim to be somebody they aren't – and the truth begins to unravel in more than one horrific way for Pascoe, as his latest floozy turns out to the prime suspect. And when all of the events are connected to the death of a man at the spa two years ago, Dalziel is forced to step in and take charge of the situation. Is Pascoe naïve enough to let the prime suspect get away just to have a little bit of fun, or will his head rule his heart? | BBC1 |
| 29 January 2006 | Lewis: Reputation | Bill Anderson | Kevin Whately and Laurence Fox | First episode, from a story by Russell Lewis. DI Lewis returns to Oxford after two years' secondment to the British Virgin Islands to recover from his wife's death, and is reluctantly assigned by his new boss, DCS Innocent, to the murder of an Oxford mathematics student who is shot while participating in a sleep study. | ITV |
| 22 March 2009 | Lewis: Allegory of Love | Bill Anderson | Kevin Whately and Laurence Fox | From a story by David Pirie. Lewis and Hathaway discover that the bizarre murder of a Czech barmaid with an antique Persian mirror parallels a similar killing found in a newly published fantasy novel, by the young Oxford author Dorian Crane. The life of another young woman is threatened, leading Lewis to suspect that the murdered girl is a victim of mistaken identity. | ITV |
| 9 May 2010 | Lewis: Dark Matter | Bille Eltringham | Kevin Whately and Laurence Fox | Lewis and Hathaway investigate the killing in suspicious circumstances of Professor Andrew Crompton, amateur astronomer and Master of Gresham College. Crompton is found dead at the university observatory after making a strange confession to a priest. His widow suspected that he had been having an affair, but Lewis and Hathaway discover that the dead man had a curious obsession. | ITV |
| 10 April 2011 | Lewis: Wild Justice | Hettie Macdonald | Kevin Whately and Laurence Fox | A bishop visiting St Gerard's College is found dead after drinking poisoned wine; Lewis and Hathaway suspect that she has been killed because of her progressive views. When another two killings occur, both mirroring macabre murders from a Jacobean revenge tragedy, it appears the murderer is targeting candidates for the post of vice-regent of the college. However, after learning that one of the suspects harbors a dark secret, Lewis and Hathaway realise the motive is much more twisted and that the murderer is avenging perceived slights from over twenty years before. | ITV |
| 24 April 2011 | Lewis: The Gift of Promise | Metin Hüseyin | Kevin Whately and Laurence Fox | (co-author with Dusty Hughes) Lewis and Hathaway investigate the murder of a businesswoman who had apparently been blackmailing the father of her protégé. The memoirs of a former head of MI5 provide Lewis with a vital clue, one which furthers the investigation that has ties with old romantic passions and the Irish Republican Army (IRA). | ITV |
| 4 February 2013 | Lewis: Intelligent Design | Tim Fywell | Kevin Whately and Laurence Fox | (Story, screenplay by Helen Jenkins) After seven years of ducking the question, Lewis and Hobson are embarking on a relationship, though the detective has a new puzzle to solve. An elderly don, Richard Seager, is struck by a car on the night of his release from prison; before dying, however, he mysteriously scratches the number '500' into the paintwork. Lewis must contend with Seager's wife, convinced that the sister of her husband's victim is the guilty party. | ITV |
