= The Wharf Studios =

British film and television studio

- Interactive map of the The Wharf Studios area

General information
- Location: 8 River Rd., Barking, England, IG 110JE
- Coordinates: 51.5269°N 0.0940°E
- Current tenants: MBS Equipment Company
- Opened: 2022
- Owner: Hackman Capital Partners (HCP)

Technical details
- Floor area: 200,000 square feet
- Grounds: 10 acres

Website
- The Wharf Studios

The Wharf Studios is a film and television studio located in the London Borough of Barking and Dagenham, East London. Developed by Hackman Capital Partners and operated by MBS Equipment Company, the complex opened in 2022.

== History ==
The development of The Wharf Studios is tied to a wider regeneration effort by the London Borough of Barking and Dagenham to establish the area as a global media and film hub, transforming the area's economic identity "from Ford to film."

In March 2021, Hackman Capital Partners (HCP), a major Los Angeles-based real estate firm specialising in studio properties, signed a deal with the local council to lease and convert the two warehouses into The Wharf Studios. This move was made to quickly boost the borough's stage capacity ahead of the completion of the larger, new-build Eastbrook Studios complex nearby. The total investment by HCP in the two studio sites was estimated at £350 million.

The Wharf Studios opened its doors in 2022, and its operations are managed by The MBS Group, a global leader in studio management and technical equipment.

== Facilities ==
The Wharf Studios is a private 10-acre riverside campus that offers over 104,000 square feet of soundstage space. It was established through the conversion of two existing large warehouses, complementing its larger sister site, Eastbrook Studios, which is also located in the borough and developed by the same partners.

=== Sound Stages ===
The complex features six purpose-built, acoustically treated sound stages, which vary in size and ceiling height, allowing for a range of production scales and formats.

Stage	Size	Ceiling Height
1	21,797 sq ft	46 ft (14 m)
2	21,937 sq ft	46 ft (14 m)
3	16,576 sq ft	34 ft (10.3 m)
4	16,770 sq ft	34 ft (10.3 m)
5	21,850 sq ft	33 ft (10 m)
6	7,276 sq ft	26 ft (8 m)

=== Other facilities ===
Supporting the main stages is over 94,000 square feet of ancillary space, including: 62,000 square feet of production offices and 32,000 square feet of workshop space and a cafe catering to cast and crew working in the studios.

== Productions ==
=== Film ===
- The Amateur (2025)

=== Television series ===
- Squid Game: The Challenge (2023)
- Hijack (2026)
- Criminal Record (TBA)
- Bad Sisters (Season 2) (2026)

== Wider initiatives ==
The studios is also involved in wider initiatives within the London borough to promote film, such as the Make It Here program by Film Barking & Dagenham. This included a visit from the Duke of Edinburgh.

In 2023, Eastbrook and The Wharf studios become the sponsor for the north terrace of Victoria Road, the home of Dagenham & Redbridge Football Club.
