= Cush Jumbo =

British actress and writer (born 1985)

Cush Jumbo OBE
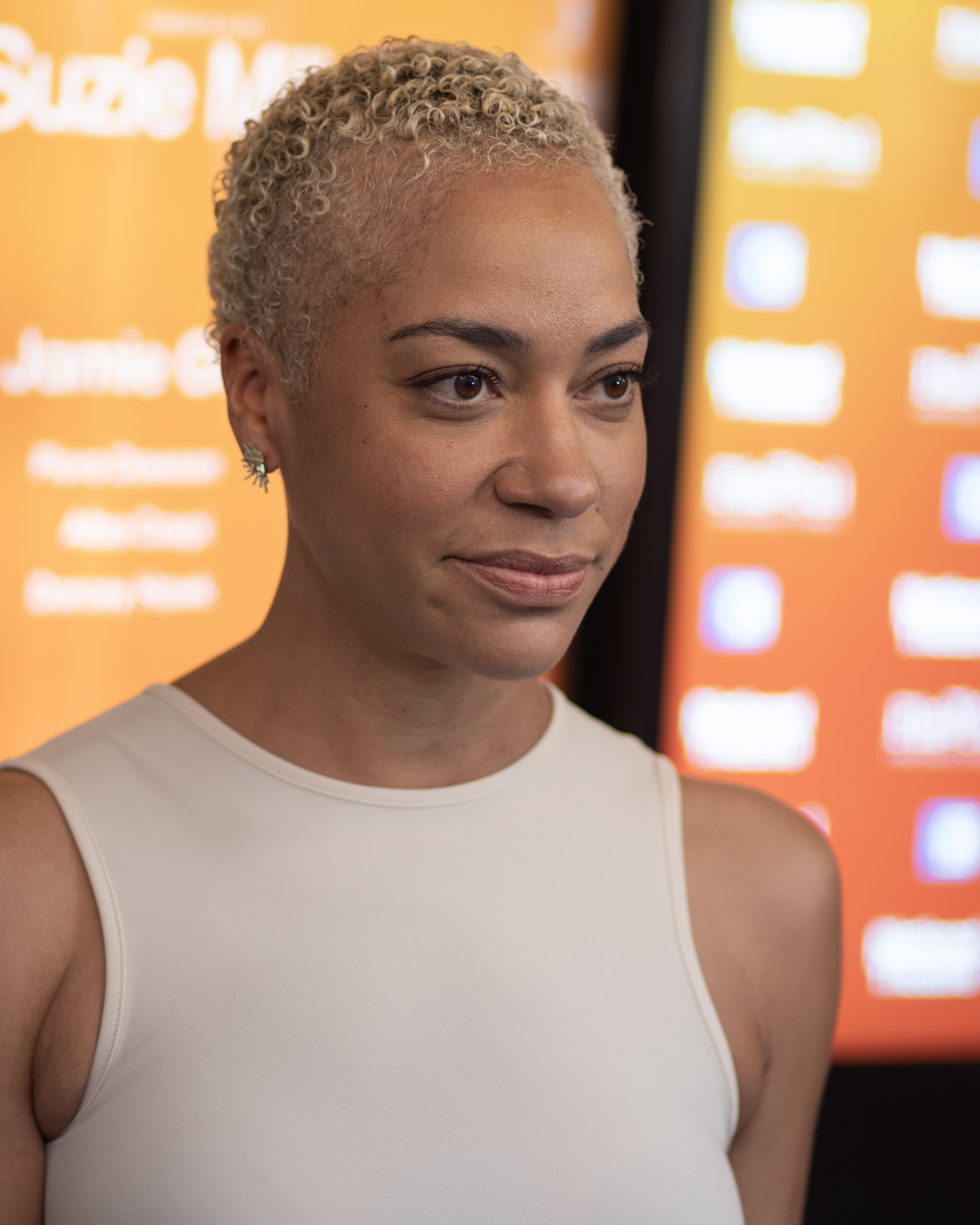
- Jumbo in 2026
- Born: 23 September 1985 (age 41); Denmark Hill, London, England
- Education: Royal Central School of Speech and Drama
- Occupations: Actress, writer, executive producer
- Years active: 2006–present
- Spouse: Sean Griffin (m. 2014; div. 2023)
- Children: 1
- Awards: Evening Standard Theatre Award

Cush Jumbo OBE (born 23 September 1985) is a British actress and writer. She is best known for her role as attorney Lucca Quinn in the CBS drama series The Good Wife (2015–2016) and its Paramount Plus spin-off series The Good Fight (2017–2021), Megan Pierce / Cassie Morris in Harlan Coben's Netflix miniseries Stay Close (2021), and most recently June Lenker in the Apple TV+ series Criminal Record (2024–).

Jumbo starred as DC Bethany Whelan in the ITV crime drama series Vera (2012, 2015–16) and as Lois Habiba in the third series of Doctor Who spin-off Torchwood in 2009.

In theatre, Jumbo received a Laurence Olivier Award nomination for playing Mark Antony in Julius Caesar in 2013, and also wrote and performed in the play Josephine and I. She was awarded an Evening Standard Theatre Award for her one-woman show, and reprised her performance Off-Broadway in 2015. Jumbo made her Broadway debut in Jez Butterworth's The River in 2014, and received her second Olivier nomination upon her 2021 return to the London stage as Hamlet.

== Early life and education ==
Cush Jumbo was born in King's College Hospital in Camberwell London to parents Angela (née Hall) and Marx Jumbo. Her mother is British and her father is Nigerian. The second of six children, she grew up in Lewisham and Southwark. She began dance classes at the age of three.

As a child, she attended Adamsrill Primary School in Sydenham. During this time she trained at Glenlyn Stage School (now Glenlyn Academy). From the age of 11 to 15, she trained at the Francis Cooper School of Dance whilst attending Cator Park School for Girls, but at 14 she left Cator Park to pursue acting more seriously at the BRIT School in Croydon. She graduated with a first from the BA (Hons) Acting course at Central School of Speech and Drama before starting her career. She considered undertaking teacher training in London before finally settling on a career as an actress.

== Career ==
Jumbo's theatre credits include portraying Nehushta in Brixton Stories at the Lyric Theatre, Hammersmith (2006), Natalie in Liquid Gold at the Almeida, and Maria Love's Labour's Lost at Shakespeare's Globe (2007). She has also appeared in productions of The Cherry Orchard, The Crucible, The Caucasian Chalk Circle, Richard III and Pygmalion at the Royal Exchange Theatre in Manchester for which she received MEN and Ian Charleson Award nominations. In 2012 she won the Ian Charleson Award for her performance as Rosalind in William Shakespeare's As You Like It at the Royal Exchange Theatre, Manchester. Clare Brennan of The Guardian wrote of Jumbo's performance in As You Like It: "If these performances truly reflect her talent, Jumbo looks set to become one of the best actresses of her generation." Jumbo played Constance Neville in She Stoops to Conquer at the National Theatre in 2012 and Mark Antony in an all female production of Julius Caesar at the Donmar Warehouse for which she received a nomination for an Olivier Award. She took part again in the production when it was revived in New York in October 2013. In May 2013, she played the role of Nora in A Doll's House at the Royal Exchange Theatre. In October 2013, she won a UK Theatre Award for this performance.

In July and August 2013, Jumbo performed in her own debut play Josephine and I, a one-woman play about jazz singer Josephine Baker, which premiered at the Bush Theatre, London. This performance won Jumbo an Emerging Talent Award at the London Evening Standard Theatre Awards in November 2013. The show was developed for transfer and began previews on 27 February 2015 at The Public Theater in New York.

She made her Broadway debut in the autumn of 2014 when she appeared in the transfer of the Royal Court Theatre production of The River by Jez Butterworth, alongside Laura Donnelly and Hugh Jackman.

Jumbo also co-wrote the musical Rebels and Retail, a shortlisted entrant in the Perfect Pitch West End Showcase 2008.

Jumbo is the co-author of 101 Dance Ideas for 5–11 yr Olds, which is published by A & C Black.

On television, Jumbo has appeared in My Family, Harley Street, as receptionist Hannah Fellows, as Lois Habiba in all five episodes of Torchwood: Children of Earth, as Becky on BBC Three's drama series Lip Service, Casualty and as Nurse Damaris in Getting On Series 2 and 3, written by Jo Brand, Jo Scanlon and Vicki Pepperdine in which Jumbo was directed by fellow Torchwood actor Peter Capaldi. She appeared as DC Bethany Whelan in series 2 of ITV's Vera, starring Brenda Blethyn, and returned to the show for series 5, broadcast in 2015, and for episode 1 of series 6 in 2016. She has also appeared several times on BBC Radio 4 in dramas and as a guest on the panel show Dilemma. She became a regular cast member in the 2015–2016 season of the CBS series The Good Wife until the series ended in 2016. She reprised her role in the series' spin-off The Good Fight. On 29 May 2020, Jumbo announced that she was departing the series after four seasons.

In October 2021, Jumbo played the title role in a production of Hamlet at the Young Vic Theatre in London, directed by Greg Hersof. The Guardian's Arifa Akbar praised her interpretation of the character as a "clear-eyed son" in a performance of "shining clarity". In 2022, she received an Olivier Award nomination for Best Actress and Critics' Circle Theatre Award for Best Shakespearean Performance.

Starting on 8 December 2023, Jumbo played the role of Lady Macbeth opposite David Tennant, in Donmar Warehouse's production of Macbeth, directed by Max Webster. She played the role until the show's closing on 10 February 2024.

In August 2025, it was announced that Jumbo would be voicing the narrator in Harry Potter: The Full-Cast Audio Editions, a production of Audible and J.K. Rowling's Pottermore.

== Personal life ==
Jumbo married Sean Griffin in 2014 and they have a son, born in 2018. They divorced in 2023.

== Filmography ==
=== Film ===
Year(s)	Title	Role	Notes
2011	The Inbetweeners Movie	Check In Woman	
2012	National Theatre Live: She Stoops to Conquer	Miss Neville	
2015	Remainder	Catherine	
2016	City of Tiny Lights	Melody Chase/Laura	
2020	The Postcard Killings	Dessie Lombard	
2024	Balestra	Joanna	
TBA	The Young People		Post-production

=== Television ===
Year(s)	Title	Role	Notes
2007	My Family	Girlfriend	Episode: "Dutch Art and Dutch Courage"
2008	Harley Street	Hannah Fellows	6 episodes
2009	Torchwood	Lois Habiba	Main cast (series 3: Children of Earth)
2009	Casualty	Zara Finchley	Episode: "Every Breath You Take"
2010	Lip Service	Becky Love	6 episodes
2010	Getting On	Damaris Clarke	5 episodes
2012, 2015–2016	Vera	DC Bethany Whelan	Main cast (series 2, 5–6)
2015–2016	The Good Wife	Lucca Quinn	Main cast (season 7)
2017–2021	The Good Fight	Lucca Quinn	Main cast (season 1-4), Guest (Season 5)
2020	Deadwater Fell	Jess Milner	TV miniseries
2020	Trying	Jane	2 episodes
2021	The Beast Must Die	Frances Cairnes	TV miniseries
2021	Stay Close	Megan Pierce / Cassie Morris	TV miniseries
2023	Derren Brown: Showman	Herself	She is selected from the audience, apparently at random, and participates in a series of tricks following off stage training.
2023	RuPaul's Drag Race UK	Herself	Guest judge (Series 5)
2024	Criminal Record	Detective Sgt. June Lenker	Main role, executive producer

=== Audio ===
Year(s)	Title	Role	Notes
2025 - 2026	Harry Potter: The Full-Cast Audio Editions	Narrator	Audible Exclusive

== Awards and honours ==
Jumbo was appointed Officer of the Order of the British Empire (OBE) in the 2019 Birthday Honours for services to drama.

Year	Award	Category	Work	Result
2011	Ian Charleson Award	Best Performance in a Play	As You Like It	Won
2013	Laurence Olivier Award	Best Actress in a Supporting Role	Julius Caesar	Nominated
2013	Evening Standard Theatre Award	Emerging Talent	Josephine and I	Won
2013	UK Theatre Award	Best Performance in a Play	A Doll's House	Won
2014	Laurence Olivier Awards	Outstanding Achievement in an Affiliate Theatre	Josephine and I	Nominated
2018	Critics' Choice Television Award	Best Supporting Actress in a Drama Series	The Good Fight	Nominated
2022	Laurence Olivier Award	Best Actress	Hamlet	Nominated
2022	Critics' Circle Theatre Award	Best Shakespearean Performance	Hamlet	Won
