= Finnish science fiction fandom =

Finnish science fiction fandom started getting organized in Finland when the first science fiction club (the Turku Science Fiction Society) was founded in Turku in 1976. The first fan conventions were in 1982 and 1985. The Finnish national convention, Finncon, was established in 1986. One of the main actors to start an active fan culture in Finland was Tom Ölander.

Biggest semiprozines in Finland are Portti, edited by Raimo Nikkonen, and Tähtivaeltaja, edited by Toni Jerrman.
