= Niko Nirvi =

Finnish video game critic

Niko Nirvi (born 16 February 1961 in Jokioinen, Finland), pen name Nnirvi, is a long-term major icon in the Finnish gaming world. He is well known for writing computer game reviews since the 1980s in MikroBitti, C=Lehti and the computer game yearbooks that were predecessors of the Pelit magazine. He has worked for the latter since its founding in 1992, and holds a column in addition to making reviews and other reports.

Nirvi began his career as a game reviewer in 1986 on pages of MikroBitti. He had made a bet with his friend that he could get his review published in the magazine. He sent in two reviews, for Zoids and Uridium, and the former was published (they already had one Uridium review). Nirvi wrote reviews and a regular column about new games for Mikrobitti and became the "game editor" of the magazine. He also wrote reviews for C=Lehti. When Pelit, that concentrated solely on gaming, was founded by the same publisher, Nirvi joined its ranks as an editor, and has written a regular column for each issue.

Nirvi's trademarks include signing with "Nnirvi" or a variation, and never showing his face in the magazine. Photos of him are always either covered or edited in a way that the face is unrecognizable. His personal picture in his articles is usually a gaming or movie character whose face is blurred (for example Master Chief) while the rest of the crew's articles feature their real faces. Wallu's drawings of Nirvi depict him as a bearded man with Spock's Vulcan ears. According to Nirvi, his avoidance of publicity started in 1988, when a MikroBitti reader asked for a photograph of him, which Nirvi instantly declined, and this avoidance has strengthened ever since. "I replied no, and then it started feeling like a good idea. Everyone can imagine what I look like on their own", Nirvi said in an interview in Suomen Kuvalehti in 2021. Nirvi does not even allow verbal descriptions of his appearance. However, he has sometimes been described as "a large, dark-haired man" and his colleague Jukka O. Kauppinen has described him as "hairy".

In 2012, Nirvi was chosen as Game Journalist of the Year at the FIGMA audience awards. Avoiding any publicity, Nirvi did not arrive to collect his award.

Nirvi's style is typically humorous and sometimes unorthodox. Some of Nirvi's most unconventional reviews were published in C=Lehti. The review of Domark's motorboat game Hydra was written as a nursery rhyme from the beginning to the end. The review of Battle Island contained just two words: "Paska Commando-klooni" ("shitty Commando clone").
