= Spellcross =

1997 video game

Spellcross: The Last Battle
- Developer: Cauldron HQ
- Publisher: Sales Curve Interactive
- Platform: MS-DOS
- Release: 1997
- Genre: Turn-based strategy
- Mode: Single-player

Helicopters against dragons and tanks against golems

Spellcross: The Last Battle (Spellcross: Poslední bitva in Czech; Spellcross: Ostatnia bitwa in Polish) is a turn-based strategy game for MS-DOS developed by the Slovak company Cauldron HQ and published by Sales Curve Interactive in 1997/1998. In Spellcross, a contemporary Earth military fights for survival against an extradimensional invasion of orcs, undead, harpies and other fantasy creatures.

== Gameplay ==
The single-player game is split into tactical battles and a strategic planning mode.

=== Strategic phase ===
In the strategic phase the player oversees a military campaign of the human forces, represented by conquering sectors on a map from the forces of darkness. One sector is the site of a final battle; when it's taken, the player progresses to the next campaign. Sectors provide limited amounts of resource points, which the player allocates between performing research, and acquiring, upgrading, and replacing the losses of military units. Reviewer Niko Nirvi observed in his article for Pelit that Spellcross was distinguished from its contemporaries by how the enemy would launch its own attempts to conquer ground - a feature, he went on to write, with strategic depth to it, as a player could find themselves hit while vulnerable instead of being allowed to get their ducks in a row. He remarked on Spellcross' resemblance to the XCOM series for having a research mechanic about studying the enemy in order to gain new equipment and plot information.

In what Nirvi noted to be a system similar to Panzer General, the player's core units persist from mission to mission, retaining their experience and equipment. They lose experience when their dead are replaced, though this can be mitigated by paying for more expensive reinforcements.

=== Tactical phase ===
In combat each unit has action points, which can be used to commit actions such as attack or move, or reserved for opportunity fire or movement.

== Plot ==
The story line pits the alliance against the forces of darkness, the game begins with Alexander(you) a colonel in the alliance forces who has become trapped behind enemy lines with a few squads of men, fighting your way through the forces of darkness you meet with the rest of the alliance and are brought to your first mission. The computer plays against you as the gate keepers or under lords who have unleashed a terrible onslaught on the earth torturing and killing many of the population they have conquered in sacrificial magic experiments. The story unfolds that they are attempting to awaken a sleeping titan within the Earth's core.

The forces of darkness use portals and gates to different dimensions to bring hordes of demonic creatures into the world.

== Release ==
The newer English version differs from the older Czech version. Some graphics and animations have been improved, the mission design has been tweaked and some of them joined. The English version includes a tutorial and cheat codes. The English version has only two difficulty settings, while the Czech version has three.

== Reception ==
Pelit gave the game a score of 85%. In his review, Niko Nirvi lamented a lack of interest on the part of the press and the publisher in what he called an "excellent" game, though one he wished had gone even further with the premise.

The Slovakian Riki Multimedia Magazine gave the game an overall rating of 89%.

Petr Poláček, marketing director of THQ Nordic's in-house Bratislava studio Nine Rocks Games, former Head of Marketing of Bohemia Interactive and LeveL editor, called Spellcross the most significant video game from Slovakia in a phone interview quoted in a blog post.
