= Jyrki Kasvi =

Finnish politician (1964–2021)

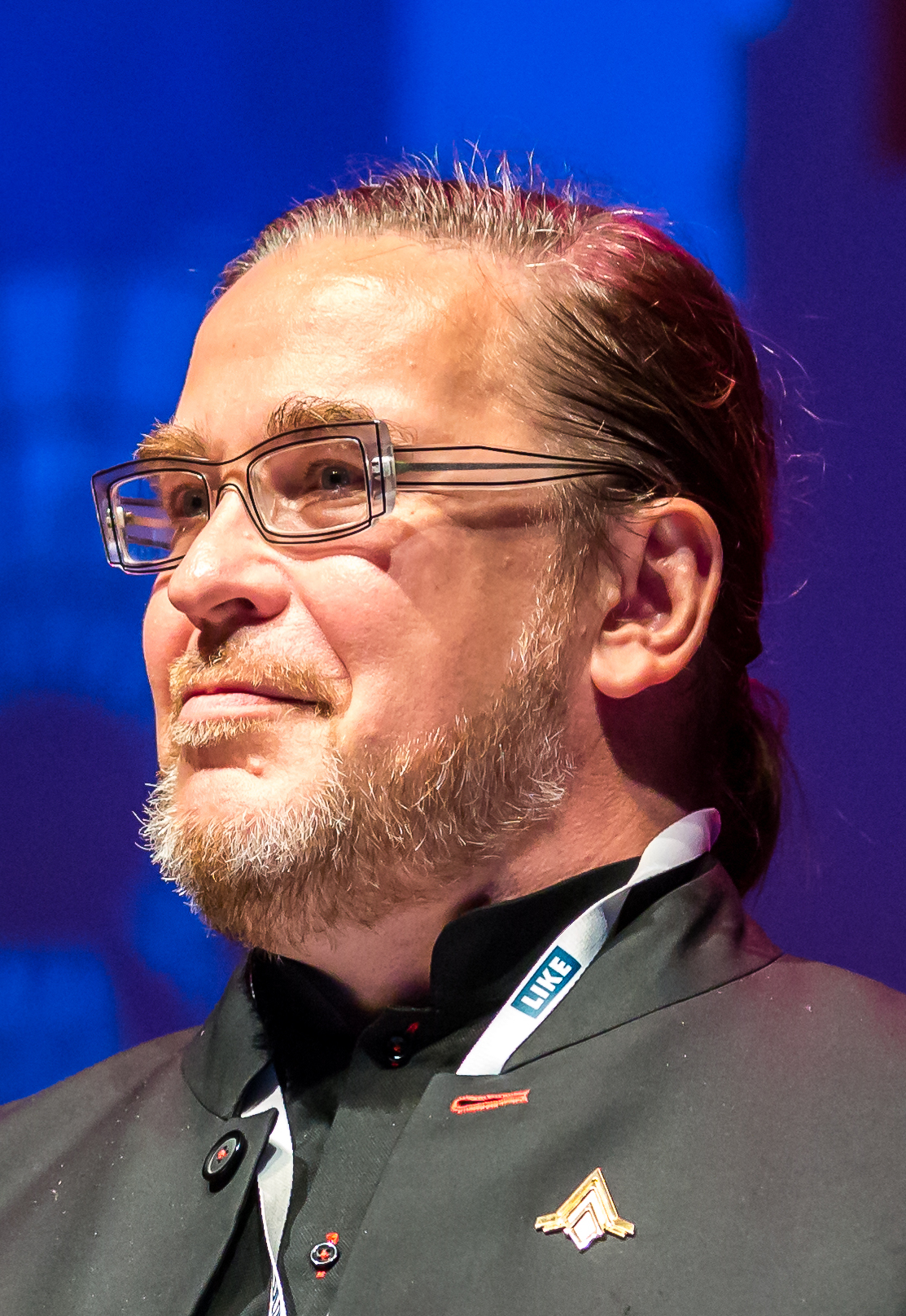
- Jyrki Kasvi in 2017
- Born: 6 January 1964; Pyhtää, Finland
- Died: 16 November 2021 (aged 57)
- Occupation: Finnish MP representing the Green League

Jyrki Jouko Juhani Kasvi (6 January 1964 – 16 November 2021) was a Finnish politician, and a member of the Finnish Parliament, representing the Green League.

== Biography ==
Kasvi held a Ph.D. in Engineering from the Helsinki University of Technology. He wrote several books about computers and information society. Kasvi was married, and the couple had a son (b. 1994). Kasvi was previously the editor in chief of Kosmoskynä, the magazine of Finnish Science Fiction Writer's Association, a games reviewer in the computer magazine MikroBitti, and a columnist in the computer games magazine Pelit under the pseudonym Wexteen the Wizard. A fan of Star Trek, he added a Klingon version to his campaign re-election website in 2007.

In Parliament, he was most active in the Committee for the Future, relating to technology assessment, which he represented in the European Parliamentary Technology Assessment network (EPTA). He was first elected to the Parliament in 2003, re-elected for a second term in 2007, and lost his seat in the election of 2011. He was again elected in 2015 but lost his seat in the 2019 elections. He was also a member of the city council of Espoo from 1997, and the second vice-president of the International Parliamentarians' Association for Information Technology (IPAIT) from 2004.

Kasvi was diagnosed with bladder cancer in 2003. In the course of his treatments, his bladder, spleen, and both kidneys were removed. In January 2021, Kasvi wrote in his blog that the cancer had spread to his liver, his treatments had been stopped, and that he had been moved to end-of-life care. He died in November 2021.

== Bibliography ==
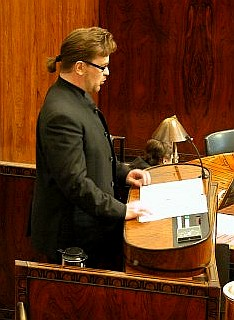
Kasvi representing the Green League speaking in the Plenum Hall of the Finnish Parliament.

- Kasvi J.J.J. (2003) Knowledge Support in Learning Operative Organisations. HUT Industrial Management and Work and Organisational Psychology Dissertation Series No 2.
- Kasvi J.J.J. (2001) Tekstarimania (Text message mania), Otava.
- Kasvi J.J.J. (2000) Nollia ja ykkösiä - Tarinoita tietokoneista, tietoyhteiskunnasta ja meistä ihmisistä (Zeros and Ones - Stories about Computers, Information Society and us People), Otava.
- Kasvi J.J.J. & Vartiainen M. (eds.) (2000), Organisation muisti - Tieto työn tukena (Memory of the Organisation - Knowledge Supporting Work), Edita.
- Kasvi J.J.J. (1992) PC:n käytön perusteet (Basics of PC use), Sanomaprint, Erikoislehdet.
- Kasvi J.J.J. (1989) Amiga 2, AmigaBasic, Erikoislehdet Oy, Tecnopress.
- Kasvi J.J.J. (1988) Amiga 1, AmigaDOS, Tecnopress Oy.
- Kasvi J.J.J. (1988) Huvia ja hyötyä MSX (Benefit and Fun MSX), Tecnopress Oy.
- Kasvi J.J.J. (1986) Huvia ja hyötyä Commodore 64 (Benefit and Fun Commodore 64), Tecnopress Oy.

Science fiction short stories:

- Ihan eri ihminen (Verkon Silmässä 2005)
- Palava taivas (Aikakone 1/1993) (Ranked 2nd best sf&f Finnish short story of the year 1993 by the Atorox Award committee)
- Pikkusisko (Aikakone 1/1991)
- Vihersiipi (Tähtivaeltaja 4/1990)
- Voihan rotta (Aikakone 3/1987)

== List of public offices ==
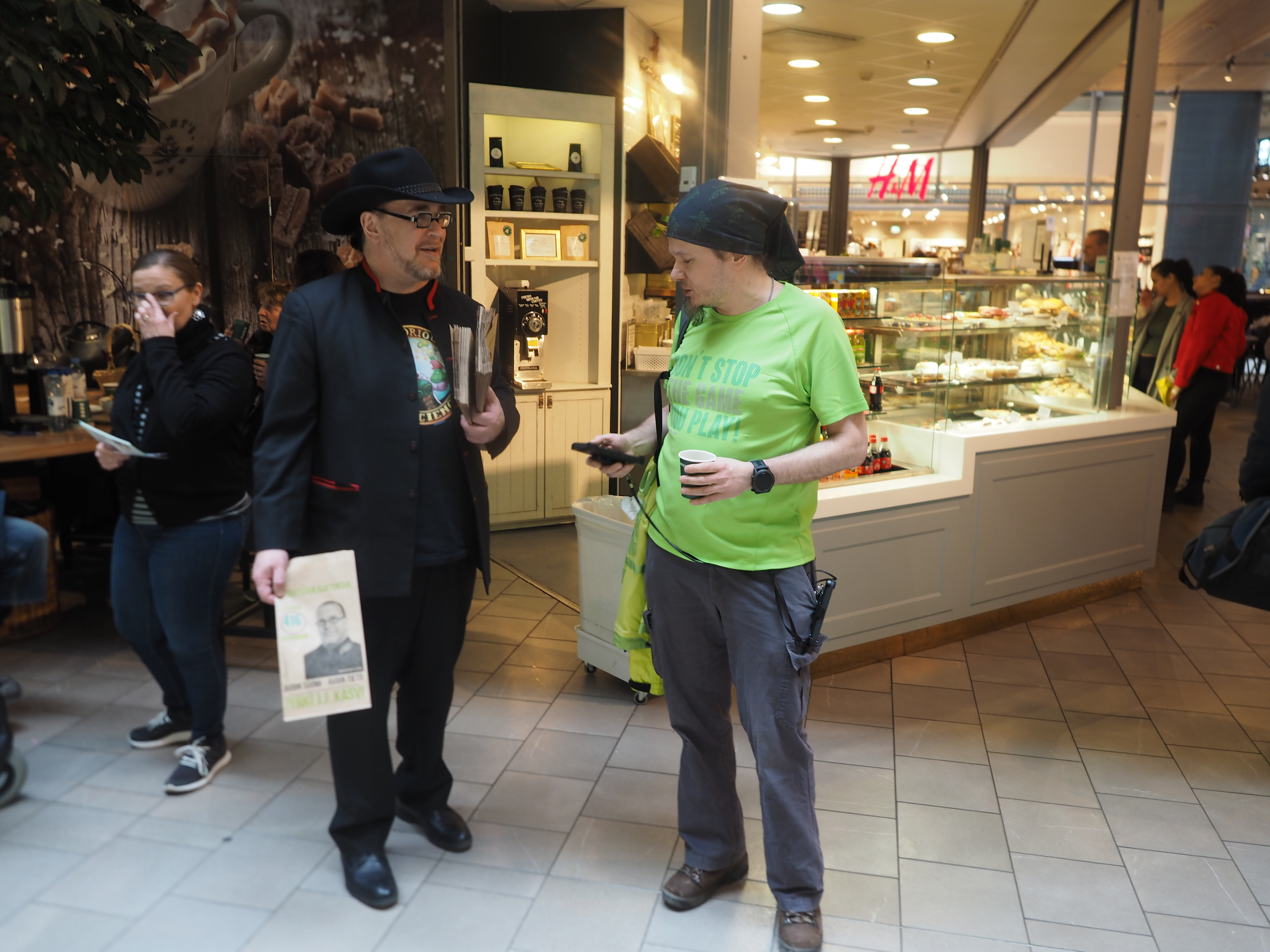
Kasvi (left, wearing hat) as a candidate for the Finnish parliamentary election in 2019.

- Member of parliament (2003–2011; 2015–2019)
- Member of Committee for the Future (2003–2011)
- Member of Espoo city council (1997–).
- Chairperson of the Committee for Technical Services of Espoo (2001–2003)
- Chairperson of the Green League city council group of the Espoo city council (2002)
- Member of the Espoo city board (1997–2000)
