= Mikrokivikausi =

Finnish comic strip

Mikrokivikausi (Finnish for "Micro Stone Age") is a Finnish comic strip drawn by Harri "Wallu" Vaalio.

Mikrokivikausi is a humorous comic set in an undistinguished period of prehistory. Although named after the Stone Age, it has included dinosaurs and other animals that were extinct long before the Stone Age.

The central characters in the comic are cavemen, one of which (the main character) has invented the computer. (How he managed to do this before the invention of electricity is not addressed.) The principal topic of the comic is computers, concerning mainly computer games, but also including some slightly more technical themes.

A notable character in the comic is Helka, the main character's matriarchal wife. Besides being the only recurring female character, she is also the only named character. A competition was held in the magazine MikroBitti, where the comic originated, to name the main character. It resulted in the name Hannu, but it was never adopted to mainstream use, and remains largely unknown. The main character is often called Guru instead.

Mikrokivikausi has been published by MikroBitti magazine since 1985 except for a period in 2014–2015 when it was published by Skrolli magazine.
