= Risto Hieta =

- Born: 1956 (age 69–70); Mänttä, Finland
- Occupation: Game designer

Risto J. Hieta (born 1956), also known by the pseudonym Nordic or Nordic the Incurable, is a Finn connected with the role playing and computer game culture.

== Early life and career ==
Hieta was born in 1956 in Mänttä in Finland.

Hieta has designed several role-playing games himself, and he is also known by columns written in game-related magazines. Hieta published his first Finnish-language role playing game, Miekka ja magia, in 1987. Other games by Hieta include Elhendi and Astra. He has made the largest number of games produced by Arctic Ranger Production. Hieta has said that he originally found role playing games via a computer game set in the Dungeons & Dragons world. According to Nordic, his designation "the incurable" refers to his feelings about dragons.

Hieta became famous by the name "Nordic" as the writer of the "Peliluola" ("The Gaming Den") column in MikroBitti. Hieta had originally contacted the magazine claiming to write better reviews than the magazine had at the time. The contact led to him becoming an assistant in the magazine. Nordic had a very personal touch in his column, and he often wrote very freely about his own and his friends' activities with computer and role playing games. "Peliluola" published gameplay hints, viewers' high scores and short reviews. Letters sent by readers played an important part in the column. The column usually started with a story about Nordic's current adventures in his role playing games. The best known figure in the stories was Petrell, a games character created by Pete, a friend of Nordic. Nordic's long-time favourite computer game in the 1980s was Boulder Dash. The first "Peliluola" column was published in MikroBitti issue 3/1985 and the last in 1998. Especially at the early times of the column, when very little was written about gaming in Finnish magazines, "Peliluola" was an important resource to Finnish computer and role playing games culture. Afterwards, Nordic wrote columns for the Pelit magazine.

Hieta worked at a Fantasiapelit games shop in Tampere until retirement in 2022.

== Publications ==
- Miekka ja magia (role playing game), 1987
- Astra (role playing game, together with Aki Tukiainen), ACE-pelit, 1991
- Elhendi (role playing game), ACE-pelit, 1993
- Roolipeliopas, Tehokopiointi ky, Tampere, 1994
- Kalmo
