= Turku Science Fiction Society =

Turku Science Fiction Society (Finnish: Turun Science Fiction Seura ry), or TSFS, is the oldest science fiction society in Finland. It was founded in 1976. The society publishes its own semiprozine, called Spin, also the oldest in Finland. It maintains a club room at the University of Turku with several related societies.

the TSFS has been the main organiser of Finncon three times, in 1999, 2003 and 2011. The 2003 event was also Eurocon and Baltcon.

Since 1983, the TSFS awards the annual Atorox Award for the best Finnish science fiction short story.
