= Animecon =

Animecon is the name of several different anime conventions:

- AnimeCon (Brazil) in Brazil
- Animecon (Finland) in Finland
- Animecon (Slovakia) in Slovakia
- AnimeCon in San Jose, California in 1991
- AnimeCon Louisville in Louisville, Kentucky
- AnimeCon UK in Liverpool in 2001
