= Skrolli =

Finnish computer magazine

- Editor: Ville-Matias Heikkilä 2012–2016; Mikko Heinonen (Exec.) 2017– Tapio Berschewsky 2017–2019; Janne Sirén 2019–2024
- Categories: Computer magazines
- Frequency: Quarterly
- Circulation: 5300 (2021)
- Founded: 2012; 13 years ago
- Company: Skrolli ry
- Country: Finland
- Language: Finnish
- Website: skrolli.fi
- ISSN: 2323-8992

Skrolli is a Finnish computer magazine. It was founded in September 2012 and a sample issue was released shortly afterwards. The magazine has been issued quarterly since March 2013. In December 2015 a crowdfunding campaign for an international English language edition was launched; this Skrolli International Edition shipped in April 2016.

While most famous in its native Finland, Skrolli has received international attention. For example in 2018, LucasArts alumni, game designer David Fox used a Skrolli magazine article about Rescue on Fractalus! as basis of a memoir thread on Twitter. In 2019, game designer Jeff Minter gave two presentations on Skrolli's stage at the Assembly demoparty.

In 2014–2015 the Finnish language Skrolli featured Mikrokivikausi comic strips by Harri "Wallu" Vaalio. The virtual cover disk of the first Skrolli International Edition included a playable demo of the game Illuminatus, which originated as a popular April fool's joke by MikroBitti magazine.

== Concept ==
The magazine's origins lie in an Internet meme image depicting how the cover of a 1980s computer magazine might look if it dealt with contemporary topics in computing. The editorial staff of the magazine consists of around ten active members of the Skrolli community.

The topics covered by Skrolli are mainly those that the commercial tech media tends to overlook. The magazine claims to emphasize a do-it-yourself attitude, a deep expertise in the issues covered, and "slow journalism", which aims to produce articles that remain relevant for extended time periods.

The editorial staff say that they want to offer a magazine which readers want to own as a physical product and save for years. Despite this, the issues (except the latest ones) can be freely downloaded in PDF format from the magazine's website.

== Skrolli International Edition ==
Skrolli International Edition is an English language printed computer culture magazine which has been issued since April 2016. It is a sister magazine of the Finnish computer magazine Skrolli that has been running since 2013. The first Skrolli International Edition issue was crowdfunded in an Indiegogo campaign in early 2016.
