= Hiltunen =

Hiltunen is a Finnish surname. Notable people with the surname include:

- Eila Hiltunen (1922–2003), Finnish sculptor
- Onni Hiltunen (1895–1971), Finnish politician
- Päivi Hiltunen-Toivio (born 1952), Finnish lawyer and diplomat
- Petri Hiltunen (born 1967), Finnish cartoonist and illustrator
- Pia Hiltunen (born 1991), Finnish politician
