= Liisa Rantalaiho =

Finnish sociologist, professor, editor, critic

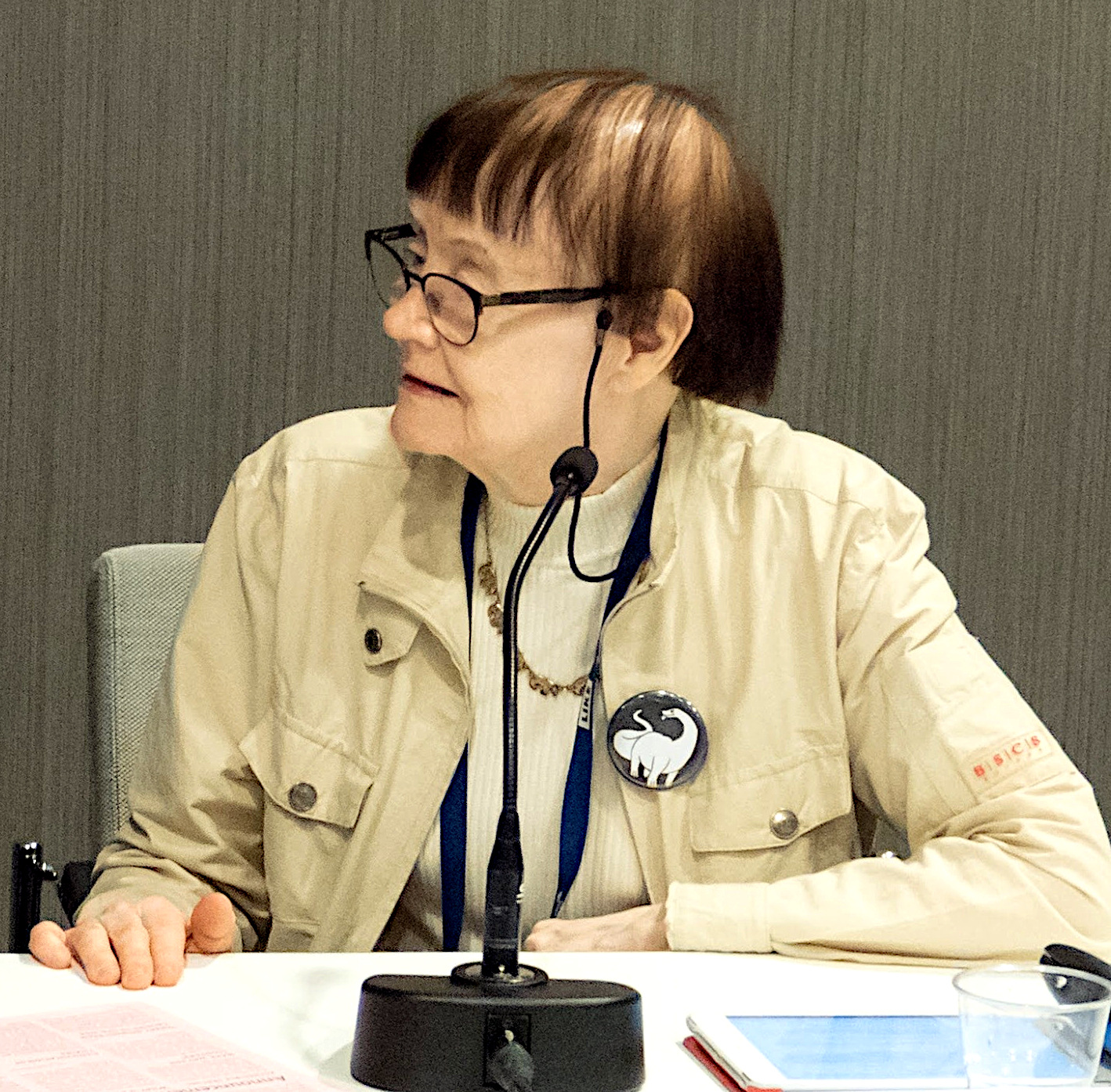
Liisa Rantalaiho at Worldcon 75 in Helsinki (2017)

Liisa Rantalaiho (born 25 January 1933) is a Finnish sociologist, fandom activist, and professor emerita in the fields of sociology of health and gender studies. She writes and performs filk songs.

== Early life and education ==
Liisa Rantalaiho was born on 25 January 1933 in Kuorevesi. She defended her Ph.D. thesis in social science in 1968.

== Research and career ==
Rantalaiho served as professor of sociology at the University of Lapland in 1988–1989, and in public health science at the University of Tampere in 1990–1998. A pioneer of women's studies in Finland, she has mainly focused on women's research, gender equality, and changes in working life. Together with Raija Julkunen, she led a research project on the Finnish welfare society and gender roles, which was funded by the Academy of Finland. Rantalaiho, alone or with others, has published a large number of articles in women's research, work life issues, and occupational psychology. She has also edited the research report Hyvinvointivaltion sukupuolijärjestelmä (1989) and has served as editor-in-chief of the journal Naistutkimus-Kvinnoforskning.

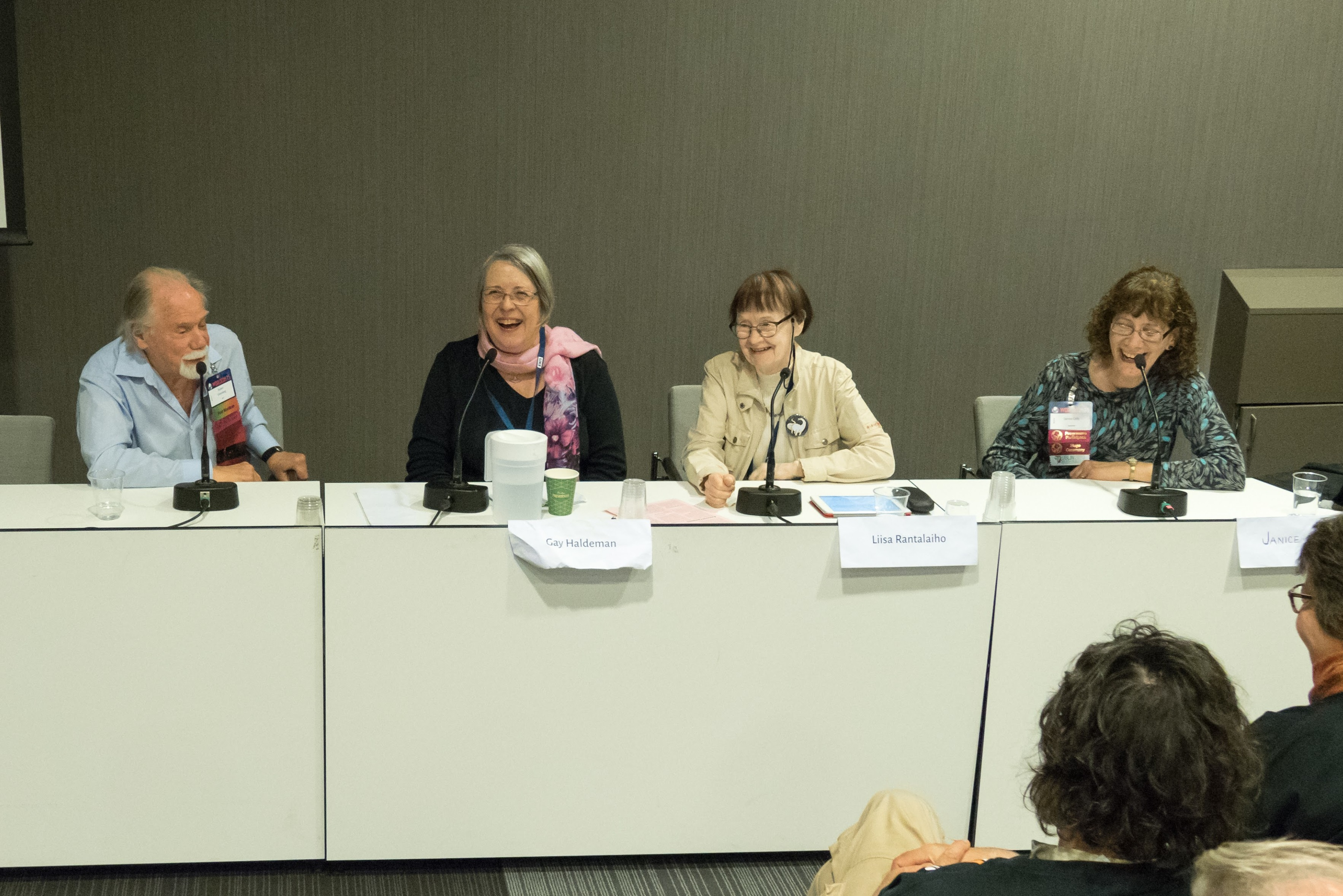
Robert Silverberg, Gay Haldeman, Liisa Rantalaiho and Janice Gelb at Worldcon 75 in Helsinki

Rantalaiho also serves on the editorial board of the Nordic Journal of Science Fiction and Fantasy Research, and was the guest of honor at the 2010 Finncon.

She was a founding member of the science fiction society, Spektre, has served as a judge of the "Portti" short story competition, and is a book reviewer for Portti magazine. The Finnish Science Fiction Writers Association awarded her with the Cosmos Pen Award in 2006 for her groundbreaking work as an advocate of Finnish science fiction literature.

== Awards and honors ==
- 1999, honorary doctorate, University of Lapland

== Selected works ==
- Naisen historiallisuus: yhteiskunta, yksilö, sukupuoli: seminaariraportti (University of Tampere, 1981) ISBN 951-44-1745-3
- Toimistoautomaatio ja toimistotyö (Tampereen yliopisto, 1984) ISBN 951-44-1593-0
- Miesten tiede, naisten puuhat: yhteiskuntatieteen kritiikkiä naisten työn näkökulmasta (Vastapaino, 1986) ISBN 951-9066-19-5
- Naistutkimuksen tieteidenvälisiä ongelmia: seminaariraportti (Tampereen yliopisto, 1987) ISBN 951-44-2114-0
