= Punaniska =

Finnish comic strip

Punaniska (Finnish for "redneck") was a Finnish western comics comic strip drawn by Harri "Wallu" Vaalio and written by Rauli "Rallu" Nordberg between 1990 and 1993.

== Concept ==
Punaniska was set in the Wild West, much like Belgian comic Lucky Luke, but even less serious. While Lucky Luke revisited factual events in Wild West history, Punaniska mostly had completely fictional stories, most of which were absurdly humorous.

Despite depicting a unilingually English culture, the comic was unilingually Finnish. A great deal of its humour depended on Finnish puns that were difficult, if not impossible, to translate into foreign languages. Still, one album was published in Germany in 1993.

The comic began in the Finnish newspaper Helsingin Sanomat, replacing an earlier Finnish comic strip called Taneli, a comic about a kindergarten-aged boy. It quickly rose in popularity and spawned fifteen comic book albums, which featured Punaniska comics drawn also by other Finnish artists (and some others, too, like Hunt Emerson from Birmingham, England), and articles about the American Wild West.

In 2003 it started again, now in a small Finnish golf magazine called "Gaddie-magazine". This new comic strip is called Viheriöiden Punaniska "Redneck on the Green" and here Punaniska plays the old Western style golf.

== Characters ==
- Punaniska : The main character. Modelled after Rauli Nordberg, writer of this comic strip, Punaniska was a stereotypical "rough and tough" cowboy. He had a taste for whiskey and women, and an itchy trigger finger. His most notable characteristic was his poor personal hygiene.
- Dolly : A beautiful woman whom Punaniska lusted after. The relation was mostly (but not entirely) one-directional, as Dolly didn't care much for Punaniska. Dolly's profession was apparently a singer at a saloon.
- Calamity Jane : In the comic, Calamity Jane was an ugly old woman who lusted after Punaniska. Because of her appearance, Punaniska despised her, and did everything he could to get away from her. However, like the real Calamity Jane, the character was good with a shotgun and had ways of getting her man.
- Billy the Kid : Like Lucky Luke, the comic emphasised "the Kid" aspect, carrying it even further. Where the Billy the Kid in Lucky Luke was a pre-teenaged brat, the Billy the Kid in Punaniska was an infant, who hadn't even learned to walk yet. He talked in baby-talk, pronouncing "R" as "L" (which led to some untranslatable Finnish puns), and was sometimes overruled by his mother.
- Törttö-Bill : A wannabe cowboy, with good intentions, but had a serious lack of intelligence. He wore a raccoon hat.
- Psycos-Bill : An outlaw, famous for the duels he had fought. At one time he showed his revolver gun, whose handle had dwindled to almost nothing due to all the notches he had carved.
