= Aarne Haapakoski =

Finnish writer

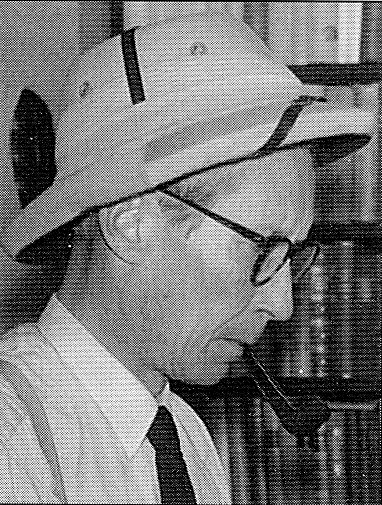
Aarne Haapakoski

Aarne Haapakoski (1904–1961) was a Finnish pulp writer. He is known for a detective fiction series about architect/detective Klaus Karma and a science fiction series about a robot named Atorox. Both series were written under the pseudonym Outsider. The Atorox Award for Finnish science fiction is named after Atorox, the robot character created by him.

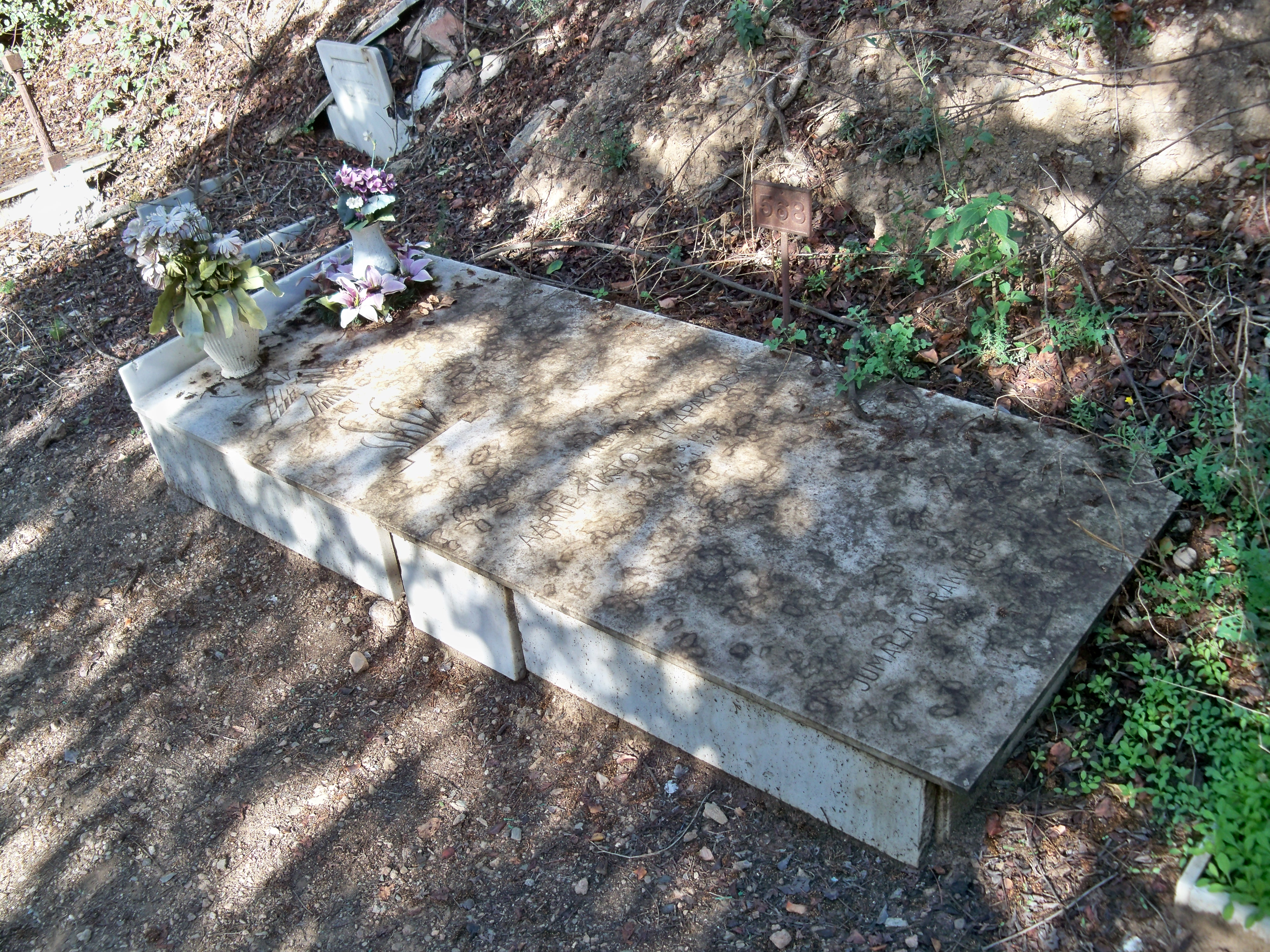
Haapakoski's grave
