= C-lehti =

Finnish computer magazine (1987–1992)

- January 1991 cover
- Frequency: Bimonthly
- Publisher: Erikoislehdet Oy Tecnopress
- First issue: 1987
- Final issue Number: 1992; 29
- Country: Finland
- Language: Finnish
- ISSN: 0783-8921
- OCLC: 477184986

C-lehti (sometimes written as C=lehti) ('C-magazine') was a Finnish computer magazine targeted specifically at Commodore computers. It was in circulation between 1987 and 1992.

== History and profile ==
C-lehti was started in 1987 as a spin-off of MikroBitti and was published six times per year. It was Finland's first ever computer magazine to only cover one specific family of computers. Originally, it covered the Commodore 64 (and to a lesser extent, its "bigger brother" Commodore 128) and the Amiga computers, but later it became more and more Amiga-centric, as the 64 and 128 were rapidly becoming obsolete. The magazine was part of Sanoma.

Later, as the Amiga started to lose market share to the PC computers and games consoles, C-lehti was discontinued and Pelit was established in 1992 as its successor, focused on PC and Amiga gaming. There were 29 magazine issues in total.

A character in C-lehti was the Guru, drawn by Harri "Wallu" Vaalio. The Guru, a bald man with a bushy beard and a shiny scalp, was the symbol for the magazine's hints and tips column. For hints & tips in computer games, he was called the Peliguru ("game guru") and had a joystick on top of his head. The Guru was never used again after the magazine was discontinued.
