= Tähtivaeltaja =

Finnish quarterly science fiction magazine

Cover of Tähtivaeltaja (March 2005) by Kimmo Isokoski.

Tähtivaeltaja (lit. 'Stellar wanderer') is a Finnish quarterly science fiction magazine published in Finland.

== History and profile ==
Tähtivaeltaja was started in 1982. The magazine is published by Helsingin science fiction -seura. Toni Jerrman has been the editor of the magazine throughout its twenty-year history. Contributors to the magazine have included Johanna Sinisalo, Jyrki Kasvi, Petri Hiltunen and Jyrki 69, among others.

== See also ==
Cover of Tähtivaeltaja 2/2005 by Kari Sihvonen

- Tähtivaeltaja Award
- Tähtifantasia Award
