= Finncon =

Finnish national science fiction convention

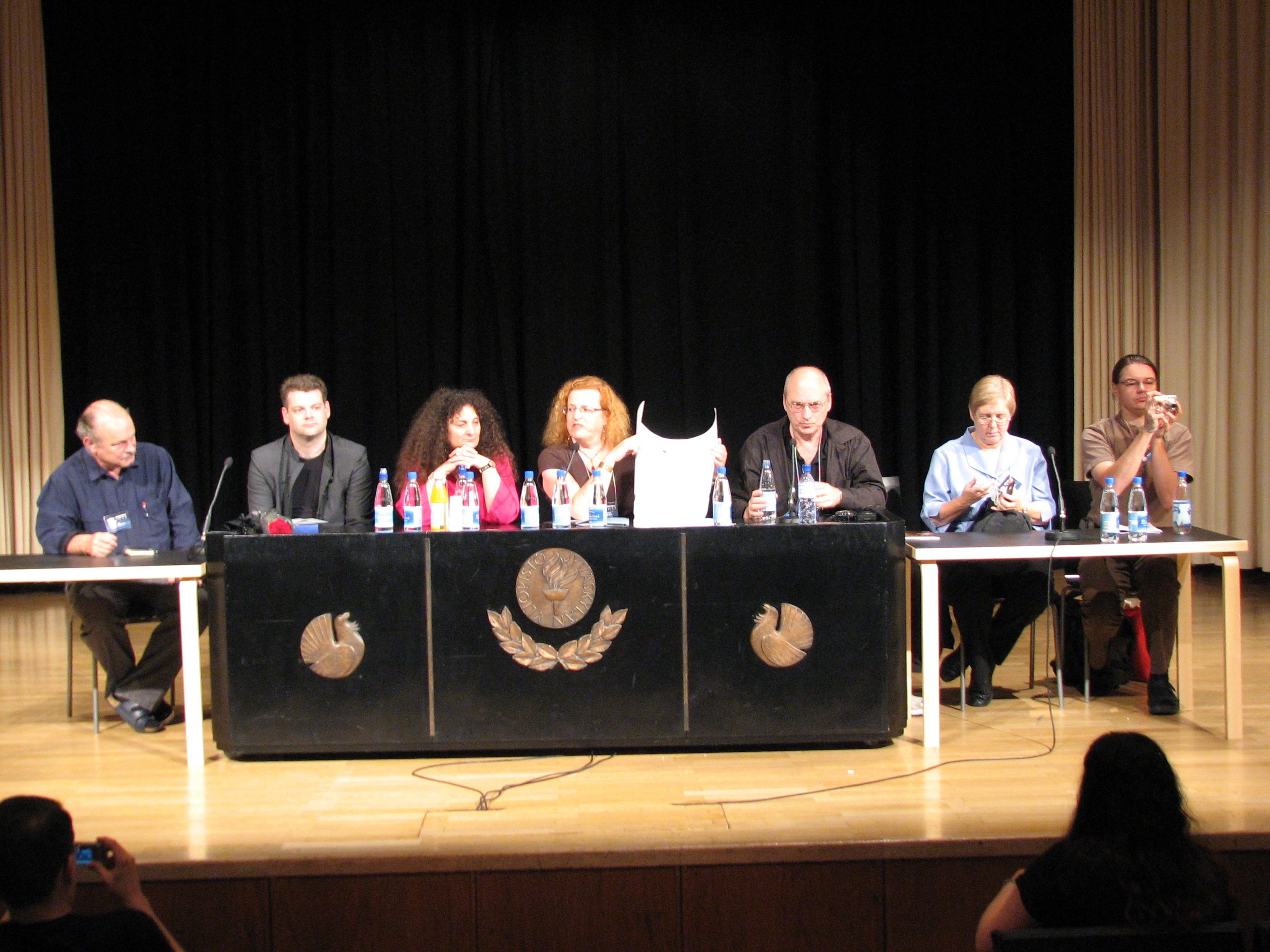
- The Guests of Honour of Finncon 2007.
- Genre: Speculative fiction
- Locations: varies between Helsinki, Turku, Jyväskylä and Tampere
- Country: Finland
- Inaugurated: 1986
- Attendance: 3000–15000
- Organizer: Finncon-yhdistys ry
- Website: http://www.finncon.org/

Finncon is the largest science fiction convention in Finland and, with up to 15,000 participants, one of the largest SF conventions in Europe. Finncon is unique among SF conventions because it has no ticket/membership fee, and is funded primarily on various cultural grants as well as income from traders. The event is organised annually in different cities in Finland.

From 2003 to 2009 and in 2011 the convention included the anime convention Animecon, which boosted the convention's attendance and public visibility significantly. Since then the conventions have separated, and the future of the Finnish Animecon is currently uncertain beyond the 2011 combined Finncon-Animecon.

Finncon 2021 was cancelled due to logistical difficulties of conducting a large scale event during the COVID-19 pandemic while adhering to the event's ethos and criteria of being open to international communities.

Finncon alternates between different cities in Finland without a formal rota. Recently the event has been held almost every year, but occasionally a year is skipped if no city is found to host the event that year.

== Finncons ==
ordinal number	year	dates	city	guests of honour	notes
1	1986		Helsinki	Brian Aldiss	
2	1989		Helsinki	John Brunner, Tom Ölander	
3	1991		Helsinki	Iain Banks	
4	1993		Helsinki	Terry Pratchett, Bryan Talbot	
5	1995	17–18 June	Jyväskylä	Bruce Sterling, Vonda McIntyre, Storm Constantine	
6	1997	16–17 August	Helsinki	Norman Spinrad, Ian McDonald	
7	1999	14–15 August	Turku	Connie Willis, Philip Pullman, Ahrvid Engholm	
8	2000	18–20 August	Helsinki	Neil Gaiman, Stephen Baxter, Ken MacLeod	
9	2001	14–15 July	Jyväskylä	Jonathan Carroll, David Langford, Stelarc, Richard Stallman, Johanna Sinisalo	also the year's Baltcon
10	2003	1–3 August	Turku	Michael Swanwick, Jonathan Clements, Steve Sansweet, Karolina Bjällerstedt Mickos, Bjørn Tore Sund, Boris Hurtta	also the year's Eurocon, Baltcon, and Animecon
11	2004	10–11 July	Jyväskylä	Robin Hobb, Gwyneth Jones, John Clute, Cheryl Morgan, Toni Jerrman	also the year's Animecon
12	2006	18–20 August	Helsinki	Jeff VanderMeer, Risto Isomäki, Justina Robson, Rickard Berghorn	also the year's Animecon
13	2007	14–15 July	Jyväskylä	Ellen Datlow, Joe Haldeman, Gay Haldeman, Elizabeth Hand, Cheryl Morgan, Ben Roimola. Jonathan Clements, John Clute, Judith Clute	also the year's Animecon, 7000 visitors
14	2008	26–27 July	Tampere	Petri Hiltunen, Charles Vess, Farah Mendlesohn, M. John Harrison, Johanna Koljonen and Nina von Rudiger as the duo Ms.Mandu	also the year's Animecon
15	2009	10–12 July	Helsinki	George R. R. Martin, Alastair Reynolds, Adam Roberts, Jari Lehtinen	also the year's Animecon, Irmelin Sandman Lilius was originally slated to be a guest of honour, however she cancelled for family reasons.
16	2010	16–18 July	Jyväskylä	Ellen Kushner, Pat Cadigan, Sari Peltoniemi, Liisa Rantalaiho	
17	2011	15–17 July	Turku	Nalo Hopkinson, Richard Morgan, Himeka, Yukihiro Notsu	also the year's Animecon
18	2012	20–22 July	Tampere	Lois McMaster Bujold, Liz Williams, Irma Hirsjärvi	
19	2013	5–7 July	Helsinki	Aliette de Bodard, J. Pekka Mäkelä, Peter Watts, Stefan Ekman	
20	2014	11–13 July	Jyväskylä	Elizabeth Bear, Hannu Rajaniemi, Jukka Halme	
21	2016	1–3 July	Tampere	Jasper Fforde, Anne Leinonen, Catherynne M. Valente, Eeva-Liisa Tenhunen	
22	2018	14–15 July	Turku	Lauren Beukes, Maria Turtschaninoff, Merja Polvinen	
23	2019	5–7 July	Jyväskylä	Charles Stross, Kersti Juva, Raine Koskimaa, Cheryl Morgan	
24	2020	10–12 July	Tampere (virtual)	Mike Carey, Helena Waris, Diane Duane, Vesa Sisättö, Bodhisattva Chattopadhyay	
25	2022	8–10 July	Espoo	Marianna Leikomaa, Malka Older, Magdalena Hai, Marko Hautala	
26	2023	7–9 July	Tampere	Diane Duane, Helena Waris, Vesa Sisättö, Marek Oziewicz	
27	2024	5–7 July	Jyväskylä	Ursula Vernon, Tiina Raevaara, Tero Ykspetäjä, Jyrki Korpua	
