= The Core of the Sun =

Finnish novel

First edition (publ. Teos)

The Core of the Sun is a "Finnish weird" novel by Johanna Sinisalo, originally published in 2013 with the title Auringon ydin. It was translated into English by Lola Rogers in 2016.

It follows a young, misunderstood woman in the Eusistocratic Republic of Finland, seeking her missing sister, Manna, and her next fix of illegal chiles—by any means necessary.

The novel's structure is unique, switching between the perspective of Vanna and another character, Jare, as well as Vanna's letters to her sister, and various definitions, acts of legislation, and other background information.

The Core of the Sun won the 2017 Prometheus award for Best Novel.

== Plot summary ==
The Eusistocratic Republic of Finland holds their citizens' health above all else, even to an extreme measure. Men and women deemed unfit ("minus men" and "neuterwomen", or "morlocks"; as opposed to the acceptable "mascos" and "femiwomen", or "eloi") are not allowed to reproduce or participate fully in society. The novel follows Vera, renamed Vanna by the government, a morlock that has been raised by her grandmother, Aulikki, as an eloi to provide her more opportunities in life. This disguised morlock combats her oppression and the pain of losing her missing sister, Mira/Manna, by ingesting illegal chili peppers that she obtains with the help of her partner, Jare.

Mira, renamed Manna by the government of Finland, is a true eloi and serves as a model for Vanna's behaviors. She goes missing after marrying Harri Nissila and moving back to her childhood home of Neulapää. Harri is found guilty of her murder after her hair and blood are found in the trunk of his car, but Manna's body is never found. This leaves Vanna with a sense of unrest, which leads to her chili pepper addiction.

Jare, a former farmhand at Vanna and Manna's childhood home of Neulapää, becomes Vanna's partner in crime after discovering her true nature. He loves Vanna, and helps her obtain the chili peppers she desires, maintain her image as an innocent eloi, and tries to help find Manna after her mysterious disappearance—putting himself in danger at every juncture. As the government begins to crack down and chili pepper suppliers run dry, Jare discovers a drug ring fronting as a religious group—the Gaians.

The Gaians consist of three members: Mirko, Valtteri, Terhi. After their business takes off, Vanna and Jare get married and move back to the farm at Neulapää. The Gaians conclude that their profits would be maximized by moving their business to Neulapää to grow their own chili peppers. Although it appears the Gaians are interested in lucrative gain, their true intentions are to create a hybrid chili pepper that allows the capso to transcend their physical body, similar to shamanism. This is achieved when Vanna ingests a pepper named "The Core of the Sun". She has an out-of-body experience where she momentarily becomes one with the world. While Vanna is transcending, Jare is out making a drug deal with a man who responded to his advertisement in the paper. The man, however, pulls a fast one on Jare, physically assaults him, and steals the pepper. Jare leaves the deal in a hurry, suspecting the man was a part of the Finnish government. He rushes back to the farm and orders everyone to leave. Upon departure, the Gaians leave Neulapää, and give Vanna one last dose of The Core of the Sun.

The story culminates when Harri is released from prison and seeks out Jare and Vanna to exact revenge for leading the authorities to him. This happens after Vanna has already ingested her last dose of The Core of the Sun, allowing her to invade Harri's thoughts and prevail against him as well as find out where her sister is. Vanna is then able to find Manna, releasing her from her physical body to join Vanna in her mind where they become Mira and Vera, together as one.

== Characters ==
- Vanna/Vera – A disguised morlock and capsaicin addict, the main character
- Manna/Mira – Vanna's sister that has disappeared, a picture-perfect eloi
- Jare – Vanna's partner in crime, childhood friend, and wannabe lover; a main character
- Harri – Manna's mysterious husband
- Aulikki – Vanna and Manna's grandmother and caretaker
- Mirko – Leader of the Gaians (a chili-pepper religious sect)
- Terhi – A morlock that works with the Gaians, someone Vanna relates to
- Valtteri – Another devoted member of the Gaians, a chili-pepper expert

== Influences ==
=== Chili peppers ===
Although the nature of chili peppers in The Core of the Sun largely differs from how they are viewed in reality, much of the information about chili peppers found in the novel is accurate. In the Afterword of the novel, Johanna Sinisalo thanks Jukka "Fatalii" Kilpinen for enhancing her knowledge of chili peppers by extending an invitation to his farm. There, she sampled and grew an assortment of peppers. Working with chili peppers allowed Sinisalo to understand factors such as the Scoville rating which is determined by capsaicinoids. The Scoville scale measures the spiciness (heat) of the pepper. One can explore the Scoville ratings, health benefits, and growing techniques of peppers on Kilpinen's website.

In The Core of the Sun's Afterword, Sinisalo describes the Transcendental Capsaicinophilic Society as "a real, though somewhat tongue-in-cheek, group that can be found on the Internet". A Google search reveals a certifiable, chili-pepper cult. Under the "Chants and Rituals" tab, one can find the "Litany Against Pain" which is referenced several times throughout the novel in a prayer-like manner. Vanna recites this poem to herself as she suffers from chili pepper withdrawals:

Teach me, chile, and I shall Learn.
Teach me, chile, and I shall Escape.
Focus my eyes, chile, and I shall See.
Consume more chiles.
I feel no pain, for the chile is my teacher.
I feel no pain, for the chile takes me beyond myself.
I feel no pain, for the chile gives me sight.

=== Eugenics ===
Sinisalo incorporates informational blurbs and definitions as part of the narrative to provide background information about the setting of the Eusistocratic Republic of Finland. In one excerpt, she draws from a fictitious book called A Short History of the Domestication of Women in which Sinisalo summarizes and explains the research of Dmitry Belyayev on the domestication of foxes as a basis for the Eusistocratic Republic of Finland's domestication of women. Belyayev's experiments actually took place beginning in 1959, and involved breeding foxes with the goal of "recreating the evolution of wolves into dogs". Over several generations of foxes, Belyayev's team only allowed those that exhibited favorable reactions towards humans to reproduce. Arguably the most remarkable observation made of these experiments was how short an amount of time it took to reduce and eradicate what were considered unfavorable traits in the foxes. Another observation was the physical change between the generations, with foxes taking on certain characteristics of dogs. Sinisalo uses these observations as foundation for the laws that the Eusistocratic Republic of Finland enforces to ensure the "positive racial hygiene" of its citizens. According to the Afterword of the novel, her research into Belyayev was done through Tiina Raevaara's book Koiraksi ihmiselle (On Dogs and Humans, Teos, 2001) as well as a National Geographic article.

== Feminist themes ==
The Core of the Sun, despite being a hybrid of several genres and portraying several different themes, can undoubtedly be labelled as a feminist novel.

=== Vanna vs. Manna ===
Manna represents society's expectations of femiwomen/elois in the Eusistocratic Republic of Finland. She, and other elois, are restricted by the government, and are forced to act, feel, look and talk a certain way. Education for elois is centered on appearance, being a good wife, and raising children. Manna's husband takes advantage of her naiveté by confining her to their house through abuse and objectifies her by selling her into sex trafficking. Elois are already harshly oppressed, but Sinisalo takes it even further by making Manna's husband an amalgamation of the worst kinds of men. Sex trafficking and domestic abuse are issues that women may face in today's society.

Vanna's character is complex in the way that she is more intelligent than the stereotypical eloi, but recognizes that success for a woman is determined by femininity. She chooses to pretend to be an eloi, avoiding the exclusion from society that obvious morlocks experience, despite resenting the expectations placed on eloi to dress and act a certain way. Because Vanna is able to recognize the constraints of gender roles and sexism, she uses her femininity to her advantage, tricking men into believing she is less intelligent and helpless, while actually being clever and self-educated. She represents women who recognize sexism and use it to their advantage.

Vanna wishes nothing but happiness for her sister, but Manna is plagued by jealousy when her first crush, Jare, appears to show interest in Vanna. In contrast to Vanna, Manna is a true eloi, and believes that having all the desirable qualities eloi are expected to have will bring her love and happiness. Vanna tries her best to let her sister shine, but her subtlety wins her the attention Manna wishes to have. After leaving home, Manna rushes into a marriage after to prove her superiority over Vanna. This marriage eventually leads to her demise, leaving Vanna feeling guilty for being the cause of Manna's jealousy. Vanna has only love for her sister, but the societal expectations placed on the sisters leads to a one-sided sibling rivalry. This is significant because it shows how women are pitted against each other not because of their instinctual feelings, but due to outside sources influencing the way they feel about each other.

=== Diction ===
Sinisalo uses terms to differentiate between the types of women and men, dictated by the Eusistocratic Republic of Finland. These terms are used to oppress their female citizens by confining them to two groups: elois and morlocks, neither of which allow for any kind of individuality or autonomy. While men are also split between mascos and minus-men, these definitions are not explored as deeply as the female categorizations since the female characters are the focus of the novel. Definitions such as elois and morlock are inspired by H. G. Wells' The Time Machine.

==== Eloi ====
Sinisalo defines an eloi as the slang word for a "femiwoman", which refers to the "sub-race of females who are active on the reproductive market and are distinguished by their dedication to the overall advancement of the male sex". Elois are the more feminine of the two categorizations of female, and are forced to wear corsets, makeup, and are defined by their sexuality. The sole purpose of an eloi's life is to take care of and reproduce with men. Their education consists only of skills to make them the best wives possible; they learn only things that help them to cook, clean, and provide comfort for their future husbands. Elois are representative of the most sexist, traditionalist view of women: domestic, submissive, and ultra-feminine.

==== Morlock ====
In The Core of the Sun, morlocks are defined as a slang term for a "neuterwoman", which refers to the "sub-race of females who, owing to physical limitations (infertility, etc.), are excluded from the mating market...a disposable segment of society whose use is limited mainly to serving as a reserve labor force for routine tasks". This definition is very blunt in its dismissal of morlocks as disposable and serves as a clear explanation as to why Vanna has gone to so much trouble to pass as an eloi. While the definition seems to claim that morlocks are naturally sterile, Sinisalo later introduces a character named Terhi that was raised as a morlock and sterilized by the government. Terhi and morlocks in general represent an extreme characterization of women that don’t fit the ideals of femininity in society are dismissed and considered lesser than women seen as traditionally feminine.
