= Not Before Sundown =

2000 novel by Johanna Sinisalo

Not before sundown
- Author: Johanna Sinisalo
- Original title: Ennen päivänlaskua ei voi
- Cover artist: Jyrki Loukkaanhuhta
- Language: Finnish
- Genre: Fantasy
- Publisher: Tammi
- Publication date: 2000
- Publication place: Finland
- Media type: Print (hardback)
- Pages: 268
- ISBN: 951-31-1886-X
- OCLC: 47287296
- LC Class: MLCS 2002/01080 (P)

Not Before Sundown (orig. fin. Ennen päivänlaskua ei voi, United States: Troll – a love story) is a novel by Finnish writer Johanna Sinisalo published in 2000. In the same year it won a Finlandia Prize for literature, and later the James Tiptree, Jr. Award in 2004 for works of science fiction or fantasy that expand or explore understanding of gender.

== Plot ==
The story is about a homosexual photographer Mikael, who finds a young and injured troll from his home yard and takes it to his home. This troll is inspired by Finnish folklore and is an intelligent, almost human-like animal that in appearance resembles a cat and a monkey. In the world of the novel trolls are existing animals instead of mythical creatures, although quite rare.

The book has multiple narrative levels, and each chapter is broken into short segments that alternate between viewpoints of different characters. Interspersed between the story are newspaper articles, old stories, novel segments, jokes and other slightly altered history that illustrates the long relationship between humans and trolls in the world of the novel. By concentrating on gay characters the story explores power structures in interpersonal relationships without the need to consider how gender roles affect them.

== Name ==
The name of the book as well as the names of its chapters are taken from a Finnish song Päivänsäde ja Menninkäinen by Tapio Rautavaara and Reino Helismaa, which says "Kas, menninkäinen ennen päivänlaskua ei voi milloinkaan olla päällä maan" (translated "A troll cannot ever stay above the ground before sundown").

== Translations ==
The novel has been translated into the following languages:

- Sweden: Bara sedan solen sjunkit, publisher Wahlström & Widstrand, Stockholm, 2002, translator Ann-Christine Relander.
- Latvia: Pirms saulrieta nav lauts, publisher Atena, Riga, 2002, translator Maima Grinberga.
- Lithuania: Trolis, Vaga Publishers, Vilnius, 2011, translator Danutė Sirijos Giraitė.
- Japan: Tenshi wa mori e kieta, publisher Sunmark Publishing, Tokyo, 2002, translator Mei Yumi.
- UK: Not Before Sundown, publisher Peter Owen Publishers, London, 2003, translator Herbert Lomas.
- France: Jamais avant le coucher du soleil, publisher Actes Sud, Arles, 2003, translator Anne Colin du Terrail.
- Czech: Ne před slunce západem, publisher One Woman Press, Prague, 2003, translator Viola Parente-Capková.
- United States (edited from the British version): Troll – A Love Story; publisher Grove/Atlantic, translator Herbert Lomas, 2004.
- Germany: Troll - Eine Liebesgeschichte, Tropen, 2005 (other information missing).
- Poland: Nie przed zachodem słońca, publisher slowo/obraz terytoria, 2005, translator Sebastian Musielak.
- Spain: Angel y el troll "Una fábula sólo para adultos", publisher Ediciones Poliedro 2006, translator Bengt Oldenburg.
- Russia: Troll, publisher Amphora, Moscow, 2006, translators E. Ioffe, L. Virolainen
