= Kalmo =

Tabletop horror role-playing game

- 1st edition of Kalmo, 1999
- Designers: Risto Hieta
- Publishers: Arctic Ranger Productions
- Publication: 1999
- Genres: Zombie horror
- Systems: unknown

Zombieroolipeli Kalmo (The Dead: The Zombie Role-Playing Game) is a Finnish role-playing game written by Risto "Nordic" Hieta and published by Arctic Ranger Productions in 1999 in which players take on the roles of zombies.

== Description ==
Kalmo is a light-hearted role-playing game where the players control characters who are newly created zombies. Because zombies are universally hated and feared, players try to integrate their zombies into normal society, hoping that no one will notice and destroy them.

== Publication history ==
Risto Hietal created a series of small role-playing games in the early 2000s that were published by Arctic Ranger Production, one of these being Kalmo. In the Finnish magazine Skrolli, Hieta explained, "Over the decades I have often tried to come up with something at least slightly new and original. Sometimes it has been realized with good sales, sometimes with slightly less success. In my opinion, a rather successful example of diversity is Rapier, which is still one of the few role-playing games in the world that focuses on elves. Kalmo also belongs to this group; there still aren't that many RPGs where every player takes on the role of a zombie."

Hieto also developed Elokalmo, a live action role-playing game version of Kalmo.
