= Praedor =

Tabletop role-playing game

Fantasiaroolipeli Jaconian seikkailijoista
- Praedor rulebook cover
- Designers: Petri Hiltunen; Ville Vuorela
- Publishers: Burger Games
- Genres: Fantasy
- Systems: Custom

Praedor is a popular Finnish role-playing game published by Burger Games in 2000 that was adapted from a fictional world created by artist Petri Hiltunen

== History ==
In the mid-1990s, Finnish book illustrator and comic book artist Petri Hiltunen created a post-apocalyptic fantasy world he called Jaconia, a pseudo-medieval world built on the ruins of an ancient high-technology society.

Hiltunen used his new world as the setting for a series of short comics titled Praedor, published in the Finnish role-playing game magazine Magus. He called the comics' protagonists "praedors" — adventurers who explore the old ruins in search of magical artifacts. Hiltunen also used the same setting for a graphic novel, Kuninkaan lapset (Children of the King), in 1998. In 2022 a Praedor omnibus of all Hiltunen's Praedor comics was published.

In 2000, Burger Games published Praedor: Roolipeli Jaconian seikkailijoista (Praedor: The Role-Playing Game of the Adventurers of Jaconia), a 258-page collaboration between Hiltunen, who provided the illustrations, and Finnish writer Ville Vuorela. The book is split into three parts: player information, gamemaster information, and a description of the setting. The latter includes a comic book overview of the lands penned by Hiltunen. Players take on the role of praedors.

The book proved popular and went through two print runs to satisfy demand. In 2007, Hiltunen and Vuorela collaborated again to produce Praedor 1.1, an expanded and updated edition. In 2020 a new version of the RPG came out, split into Pelinjohtajan kirja (Game Master's Book) and Seikkailijan kirja (Adventurer's Book)

The next year, Hiltunen followed up with another graphic novel based on the Jaconia setting, Kuolleen jumalan palvelija (Servant of the Dead God), and Vuorela wrote a Jaconia novel, Vanha koira (Old Hound) in 2004. Praedor went on to become the pre-eminent role-playing game in Finland. The Finnish Museum of Games describes Praedor as "an international sales success and one of the milestones of Finnish RPG publishing."

Sixteen years after the publication of the original Praedor, Vuorela wrote a series of expansions:

- Salaisuuksien kirja (Book of Secrets), 2016.
- Kirottu kirja (The Cursed book), 2017.
- Varjojen kirja (Book of Shadows), 2018.
- A fourth sourcebook, Kielletyn rakkauden kirja (Book of the Forbidden love), was written by Kristel Nyberg
- Tarinoiden kirja (Book of Tales), 2022.
- Kavala kirja (Book of Intrigue), 2023.

A series of novels by various authors including Vuorela was also published from 2014–2023.

== Description ==
=== Setting ===
Jaconia is a circular land roughly 2000 km in diameter, populated by a medieval society with a strict caste system. It is surrounded by the "cursed" land of Borvaria, in reality the ruins of a huge city, all that remains of a highly advanced society that was destroyed in the distant past. Some Jaconians, driven by greed, need or curiosity, shake off the societal bonds to become "praedors", outcasts who comb the ancient Borvarian ruins for pieces of ancient technology that are now called "magic".

=== Game mechanics ===
Like many fantasy role-playing games, Praedor uses a system of attributes (Strength, Constitution, etc.) to define a character's abilities. However, there are no "classes" or defined occupations. Instead, the character is defined by skills that the player chooses. The game uses primarily six-sided dice, often rolled as multiple dice versus a target or a skill check.

== Reception ==
Writing a retrospective review in 2016 for the Finnish game review site PlayLab, Jukka Särkijärvi called the 16-year-old game system "elegant and simple [...] the system is fast to learn and use, and intuitive to understand." He did note that "Combat encounters tend to be brutal [...] it is perfectly possible to win the fight and die on the sickbed." However, Särkijärvi concluded that the old game still held up, saying, "Praedor is beginner-friendly and still rewarding to the veteran. Its clever mechanics and strong atmosphere make it an enduring classic."
