= Tom Ölander =

Finnish actor

Tom Ölander (17 August 1945 - 26 August 2002) was one of the main actors to kick-start an active fannish culture in Finland. He was the prime mover for the second Finnish sf convention King Con in 1989, with the assistance of a boat load of Swedish imports, and regularized the tradition of convention holding by working to institute the biannual Finncon tradition. For these efforts he is domestically known as the "father of Finnish Fandom", and internationally as "Finland's Mr. Science Fiction". In recognition of his significant role in the Finnish science fiction fandom, Ölander was a Guest of Honor of Finncon 1989.

In addition to his local activities, he often worked behind the scenes and focused on building connections between geographically dispersed international fan communities.

Together with Jari Koponen, Olavi Markkanen and Jyrki Ijäs, he formed the editorial board of the first Finnish nationwide science fiction magazine, Aikakone, started in 1981.
