= Pelit =

Finnish video game magazine

- Cover for issue 6-7/2006
- Editor: Tuukka Grönholm
- Categories: Video game magazine
- Frequency: Monthly
- Circulation: 21,469 (2013)
- Founded: 1992
- Company: Fokus Media Finland
- Country: Finland
- Based in: Helsinki
- Language: Finnish
- Website: pelit.fi
- ISSN: 1235-1199

Pelit ("Games") is a Finnish video games magazine published in Helsinki, Finland.

== History ==
Pelit dates back to 1987, as an annual extra games-only issue of MikroBitti and C-lehti. Another annual issue was published in 1988, and in 1989 it became semi-annual (two times per year). In 1992, the staff of the semi-annual computer game book launched Pelit as a fully-fledged magazine.

Its layout and contents have occasionally been revised over the years. Game walkthroughs were dropped as the adventure and old-fashioned role-playing games fell out of fashion. A comic, KyöPelit, was started in 1993. While the magazine started with four computer platforms, coverage of the Amiga, Commodore 64 and Atari ST was reduced as the market share for those platforms diminished. The most notable changes to the magazine format were the 1998 founding of its sister publication, the PlayStation-focused Peliasema, and the later merging of the two due to the growth of the console market and the weakening of the PC games market.

The magazine was published 11 times a year by Sanoma Magazines, a division of the Sanoma Group. The group sold the magazine to Fokus Media Finland on 1 September 2014.

Pelit's editor-in-chief was Tuija Lindén. Its staff include Niko Nirvi and the cartoonist Wallu. Jyrki Kasvi spent several years as a game reviewer and columnist under the pseudonym Wexteen the Wizard, before entering politics and becoming a member of the Finnish Parliament between 2003–2011. Pelit's review scores are listed on Metacritic.

The 2011 circulation of the monthly was 26,245 copies. The magazine had a circulation of 21,469 copies in 2013.

== See also ==
- List of magazines in Finland
