= Atorox Award =

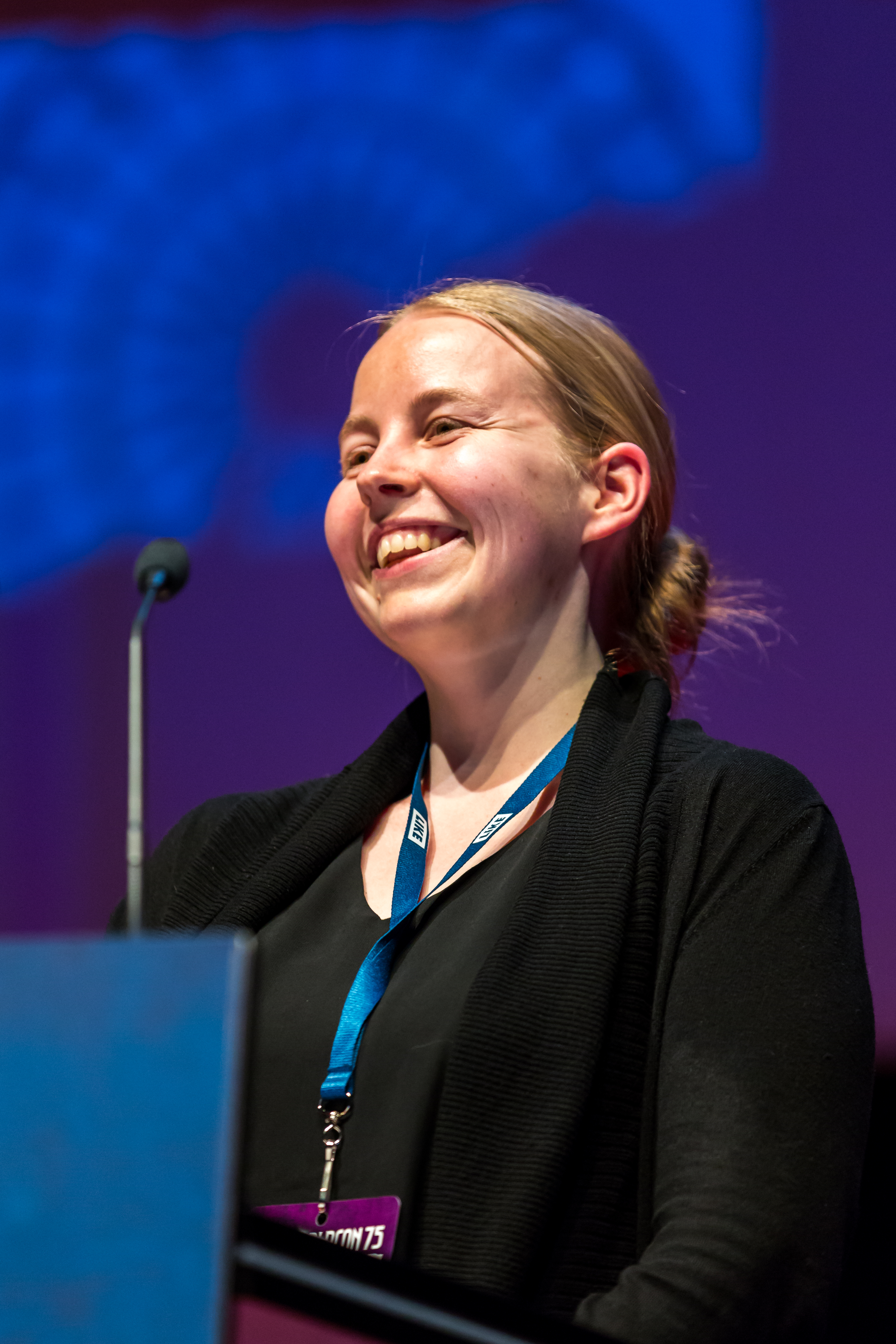
Maiju Ihalainen accepting the award at Worldcon in Helsinki 2017.

The Atorox Award (Finnish: Atorox-palkinto, Swedish: Atoroxpriset) is the oldest science fiction literature award in Finland. It is given annually to the best science fiction short story. The name "Atorox" comes from the works of Aarne Haapakoski (1904–1961), who was one of the first science fiction writers in Finland. The award is given by the Turku Science Fiction Society but the winner is selected by representatives of the entire Finnish fandom. It has been awarded annually since 1983. Johanna Sinisalo has been given the Atorox Award seven times, more times than any other writer.

== Winners ==
- 1983 Antti Oikarinen, "Jumalten vuori"
- 1984 Eija Elo, "Napoleonin vaihtoviikot"
- 1985 Pekka Virtanen, "Perinne",
- 1986 Johanna Sinisalo, "Suklaalaput"
- 1987 Kimmo Saneri, "Ollin oppivuodet, Aapelin alkuasetelmat"
- 1988 S. Albert Kivinen, "Keskiyön mato Ikaalisissa"
- 1989 Johanna Sinisalo, "Hanna"
- 1990 Ari Tervonen, "Matkalla nurinkäännettyyn avaruuteen"
- 1991 Johanna Sinisalo, "Punatähti"
- 1992 Risto Isomäki, "Puu"
- 1993 Johanna Sinisalo, "Kharonin lautta"
- 1994 Johanna Sinisalo, "Me vakuutamme sinut"
- 1995 Atro Lahtela, "Poimu (2 piste 2 viiva 2 piste 8)"
- 1996 Eeva-Liisa Tenhunen, "Ursa Amanda"
- 1997 Johanna Sinisalo, "Tango merellä"
- 1998 Pasi Jääskeläinen, "Missä junat kääntyvät"
- 1999 Pasi Jääskeläinen, "Pinnan alla Toiseus piilee"
- 2000 Pasi Jääskeläinen, "Oi niitä aikoja: elämäni kirjastonhoitajattaren kanssa"
- 2001 Johanna Sinisalo, "Lentävä hollantilainen"
- 2002 A.C. Ross, "Sokeat näkevät unia"
- 2003 Tero Niemi and Anne Salminen, "Ja jumala kutoi mattoja omista hiuksistaan"
- 2004 Anne Leinonen, "Valkeita lankoja"
- 2005 Tero Niemi and Anne Salminen, "Matka Reformaan"
- 2006 Jenny Kangasvuo, "Kaikessa lihassa on tahto"
- 2007 Anne Leinonen, "Toisinkainen"
- 2008 Susi Vaasjoki, "Taruntekijä"
- 2009 Mari Saario, "Kenkänaula"
- 2010 Heikki Nevala, "Koneesta sinä olet syntyvä"
- 2011 Anne Leinonen, "Nahat"
- 2012 Pasi Ilmari Jääskeläinen, "Kirje Lethelle"
- 2013 Anni Nupponen, "Joka ratasta pyörittää"
- 2014 Jussi Katajala, "Mare Nostrum"
- 2015 Maiju Ihalainen, "Terrakotta"
- 2016 Magdalena Hai, "Kaunis Ululian"
- 2017 Maiju Ihalainen, "Itkevän taivaan temppeli"
- 2018 Jenny Kangasvuo, "Musta otsa"
- 2019 Janos Honkonen, "Sadan vuoden huuto"
- 2020 Reetta Vuokko-Syrjänen, "Emma Halmin vaihtoehdot kuolemalle"
- 2021 Reetta Vuokko-Syrjänen, "Neljäs porsas"
- 2022 Maarit Leijon, "Mustarastas"
- 2023 Anssi Vartiainen, "Hyödyttömän tavaran puoti"
- 2024 Reetta Vuokko-Syrjänen, "Mahdottomien kukkien puutarha"
