= Animecon (Finland) =

Anime convention

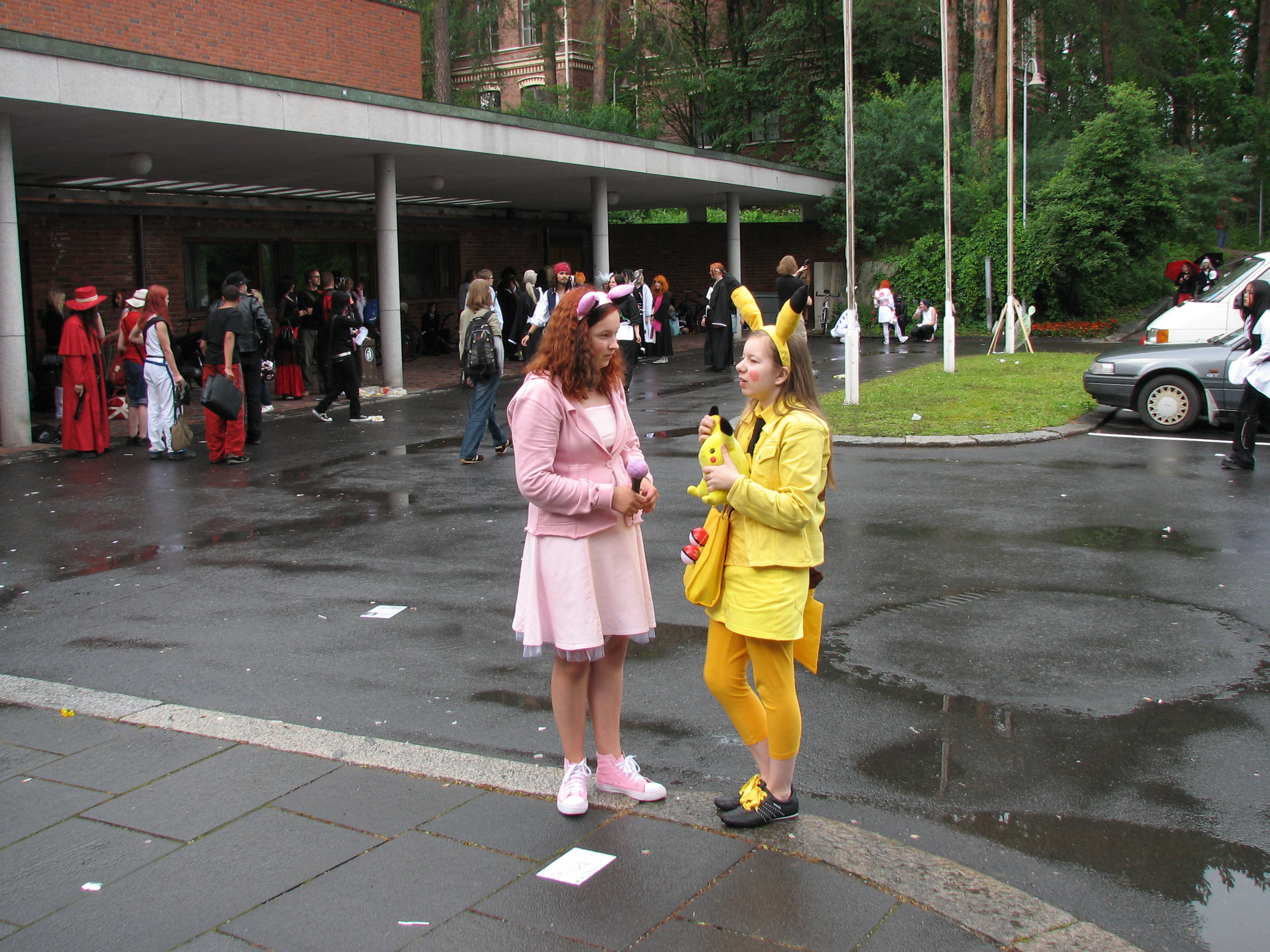
- Two girls cosplaying as anime characters during Animecon 2007
- Status: Active
- Location: Varies
- Country: Finland
- Inaugurated: 1999
- Attendance: approx. 7,000 in 2007, together with Finncon
- Organizer: 1999-2011 Various organizations 2012–2016 KAMY 2017-present Suomen Con-Tapahtumat Oy
- Website: http://www.animecon.fi/ https://www.animecon.eu/

Animecon is anime convention in Finland, held annually over a weekend in varying Finnish cities.

Animecon was organized as a joint project between anime clubs throughout Finland, facilitated by the communications hub Suomen Animeunioni (The Finnish Anime Union). The convention was first established in 1999 as an outgrowth of the science fiction anime fandom of the sci-fi convention Finncon, expanded into a separate event about anime in general. Animecon and Finncon have been held in conjunction, sharing premises but no events; they even often held separate opening ceremonies. In 2012 Animecon was held at the city of Kuopio for a first time and the convention has remained there since then.

The two drew some 5200 visitors in 2004 and 5500 in 2006, peaking at 5000 on Saturday during the three-day event. After the 2007 conventions, an organizer cited the number of visitors as an estimated 7000. Animecon II was the first major cosplay event in Finland, and the practice has been noted for its abundance in later ones.

== History ==
=== Event history ===
| Dates | Location | Atten. | Guests |
|---|---|---|---|
| August 1–3, 2003 | University of Turku; Turku | 4,000 | Jonathan Clements. |
| July 10–11, 2004 | University of Jyväskylä; Jyväskylä | 5,200 | yoshitoshi ABe and Jonathan Clements. |
| August 18–20, 2006 | Helsinki Congress Paasitorni; Helsinki | 9,000 | Paul Gravett. |
| July 14–15, 2007 | University of Jyväskylä; Jyväskylä | 7,000 | Jonathan Clements |
| July 26–27, 2008 | Tampere Hall; Tampere | 9,000 | Ms Mandu |
| July 10–12, 2009 | Kaapelitehdas; Helsinki | | Jari Lehtinen |
| July 16-17, 2011 | Turku | | Himeka, Yukihiro Notsu |
| July 14-15, 2012 | Kuopio Music Centre; Kuopio | | Yoshihiro Takahashi, Team 4 Star, Benzaie |
| July 13-14, 2013 | Kuopio Music Centre; Kuopio | | DJ Sharpnel, Spoony, Benzaie |
| July 12-13, 2014 | Kuopio Music Centre; Kuopio | | Kaoru Mori |
| July 11-12, 2015 | Kuopio Music Centre; Kuopio | | Doug Walker |
| July 9-10, 2016 | Congress Centre Paviljonki; Jyväskylä | | Animenz, Reika |
| July 15-16, 2017 | Kuopio Music Centre; Kuopio | | The Anime Man, Akidearest, Riuchi Manga |
| July 14-15, 2018 | Helsinki Fair Centre; Helsinki | | The Anime Man, Akidearest, Ryukishi07, Kore Yamazaki, Kamui Cosplay |
