= Petri Hiltunen =

Finnish cartoonist and illustrator (born 1967)

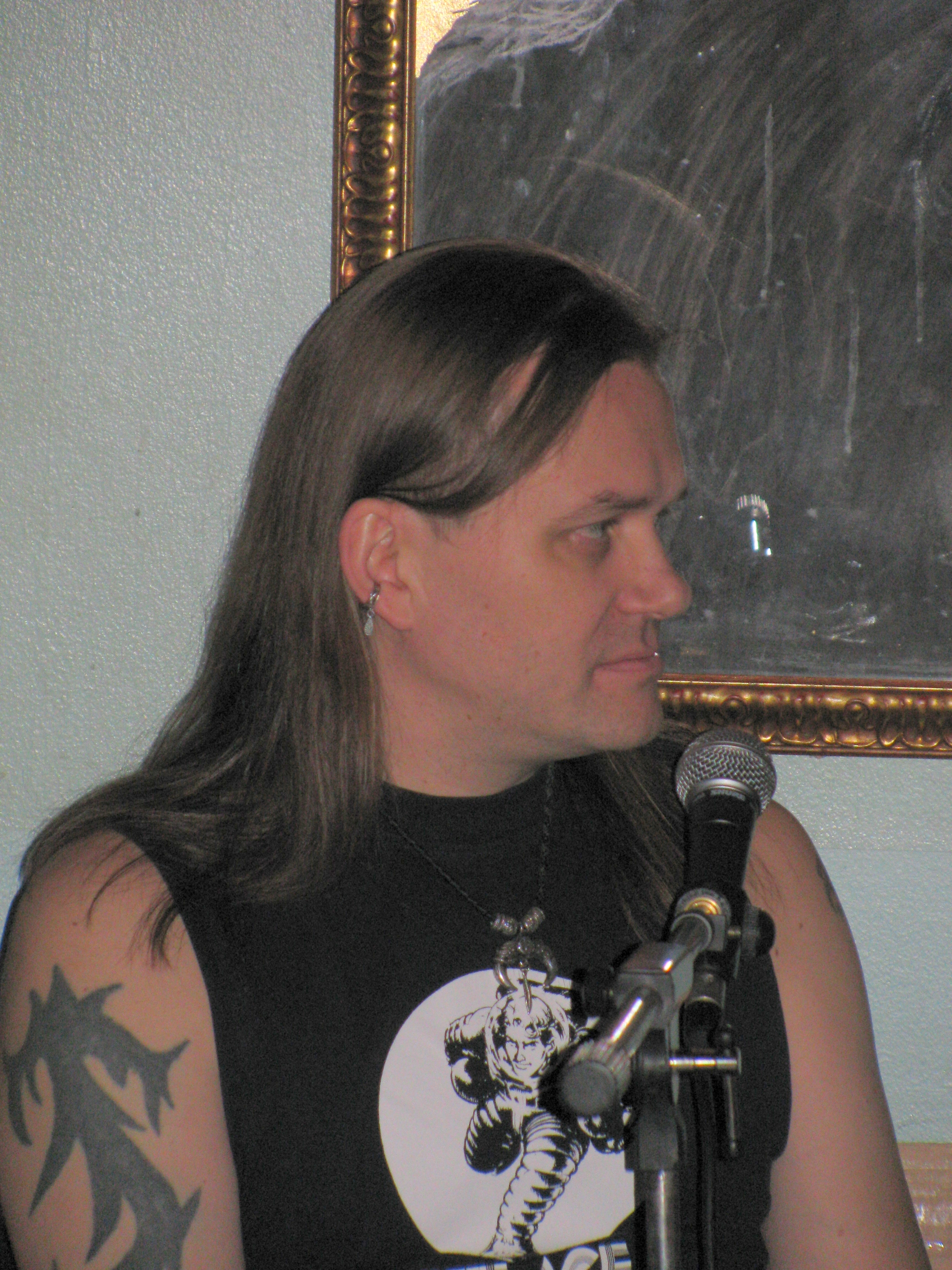
Petri Hiltunen (2008)

Petri Hiltunen (born 13 October 1967) is a Finnish cartoonist and illustrator. Hiltunen has produced work in a variety of genres, but is most notable for his fantasy and horror work. He has won the prestigious Puupäähattu award in 2002, which is regarded as the highest honour for Finnish comic artists. He is also a well-known figure in Finnish science fiction fandom and a regular panelist and guest of honour at conventions, such as Finncon.

His own comic albums include the horror/fantasy tale Laulu yön lapsista ("Song of the children of the night"), exploring the vampire folklore of 1562 Russia during the reign of Ivan the Terrible, and a graphic novel version of Macbeth. The fantasy world of Jaconia, created for his Praedor comics, has been adapted into a role-playing game of the same name. His work has also been featured in the science fiction magazine Tähtivaeltaja, the Finnish Conan magazine and twice in the war comics magazine Korkeajännitys: a western story and one story set in the Finnish War. His drawing style is quite detailed, particularly with his characters, and features heavy lines.

Hiltunen is best known in the Finnish popular consciousness from his much lighter, humorous newspaper comic strip Väinämöisen paluu ("The Return of Väinämöinen"), published in many major newspapers and as comic books. In it, the Eternal Sage of Kalevala ends his self-imposed exile to find that he might have been gone for too long. He must try to adjust to modern Finland (e.g. finding out that these newfangled "potatoes" are now considered a traditional food) as modern Finland must try to adjust to him (e.g. a group of neo-nazis coming to greet him and introducing themselves as indigenous Finns; they are nonplussed when he starts apologizing and it turns out he thought they were Sami.) As the culture shock gradually faded, the strip became a more character-based comedy but eventually faded in turn.
