= Johanna Sinisalo =

Finnish writer (born 1958)

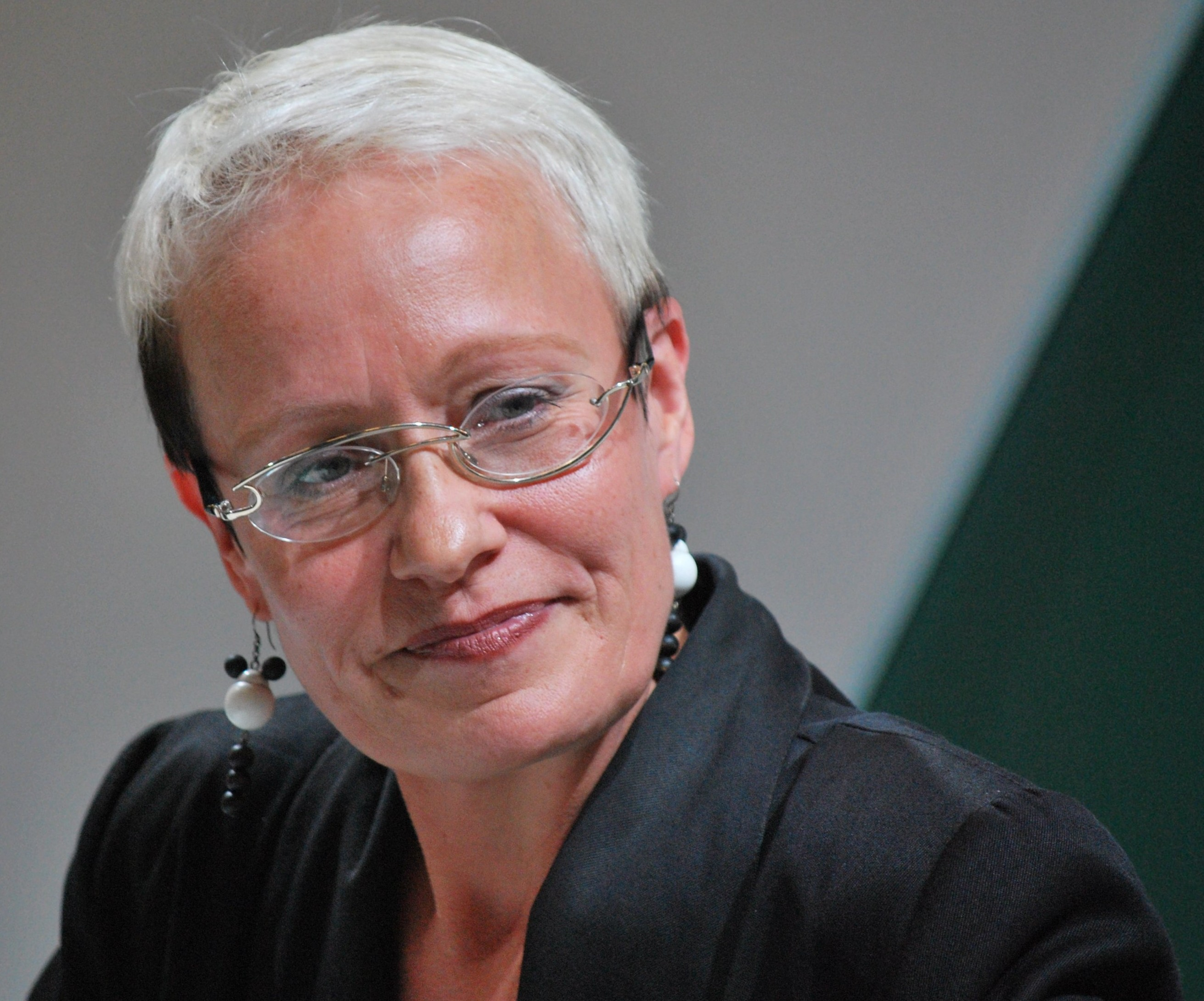
- Johanna Sinisalo in October 2008.
- Born: Aila Johanna Sinisalo; 22 June 1958 (age 68); Sodankylä, Finland
- Occupations: Science fiction and fantasy writer
- Writing career
- Pen name: Johanna Sinisalo
- Genres: Science fiction, fantasy
- Notable awards: Atorox Award, Finlandia Prize, The James Tiptree Jr. award, Prometheus Award

Johanna Sinisalo (born Aila Johanna Sinisalo; June 22, 1958) is a Finnish science fiction and fantasy writer. Since starting her writing career with science fiction and fantasy short stories, she has become a prominent figure in Finnish literature scene, and in 2022 was awarded the Pro Finlandia Medal, a special decoration of The Order of the Lion of Finland, awarded to artists and authors in recognition of outstanding civilian or military merit. Other than for short stories and novels, Sinisalo has written comics, screenplays for TV and radio, and edited anthologies.

== Personal life ==
Sinisalo was born in Sodankylä, Finland. She majored in literature and drama with side studies in journalism and social psychology, at the University of Tampere. Before becoming a full-time writer, she worked as a copywriter and an executive of an advertising agency. Sinisalo has named the 1967 novel Friday, or, The Other Island by French writer Michel Tournier as a major influence on her career.

== Career ==
Sinisalo started her writing career writing science fiction and fantasy short stories. Her first short stories Kilometripylväät and Jäinen kaupunki were published together in the Finnish original anthology Vuosirengas 74 in 1974. She has won several Atorox Awards for her short stories. Her short story Baby Doll was nominated for the Nebula award in 2009.

Sinisalo's first novel, Ennen päivänlaskua ei voi (Not Before Sundown, published in English in 2003) was published in 2000. The book has been translated to several language, and has won the Finlandia Prize, the most prestigious literary award in Finland. The novel also tied the James Tiptree Jr. Award, in 2004. The movie rights to the novel were acquired by Carter Smith in 2006, but the project since fell through and the movie rights have been since been acquired by Tuppence Middleton in 2022.

Since her first novel, Sinisalo has written several novels including Linnunaivot (2008, published in English in 2010 titled Birdbrain), Enkelten verta (2011, published in English in 2014 titled The Blood of the Angels), and Auringon ydin (2013, published in English in 2016 titled The Core of the Sun). Her works have been translated to 20 languages.

Sinisalo has worked as a screenwriter in several Finnish TV and radio productions. She also worked on the screenwriting team of Iron Sky, a 2012 comic-science-fiction. The movie had the biggest budget of any production in Finnish film history at the time of its release.

== Notable awards and honors ==
- Finlandia Prize for literature in 2000, for Not Before Sundown
- James Tiptree Jr. award in 2004 for Not Before Sundown
- Nebula Award nomination in 2009 for Baby Doll
- Atorox Award for best Finnish science fiction short story
  - in 1986 for Suklaalaput
  - in 1989 for Hanna
  - in 1993 for Punatähti
  - in 1994 for Kharonin lautta
  - in 1997 for Me vakuutamme sinut
  - in 2001 for Tango Merellä
- Prometheus Award for Best Novel for The Core of the Sun
- Pro Finlandia Medal, Order of the Lion of Finland in 2022

== Bibliography ==
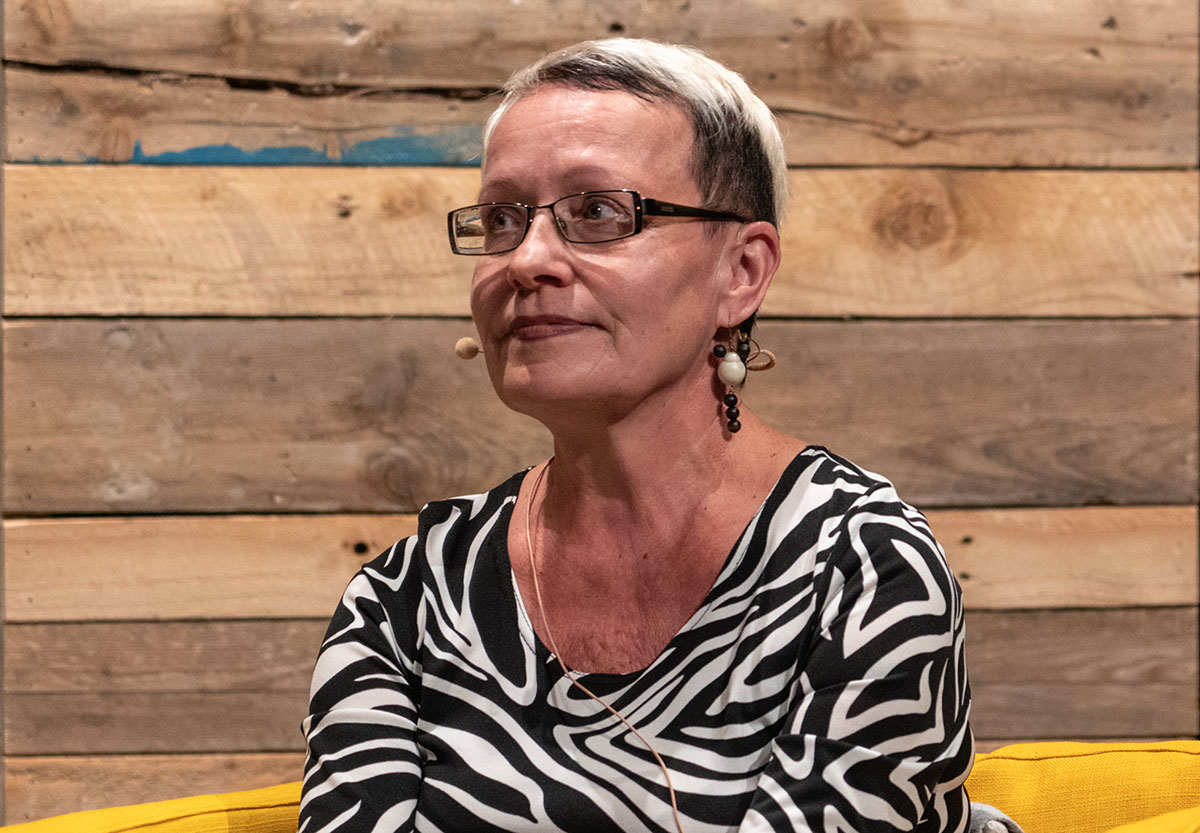
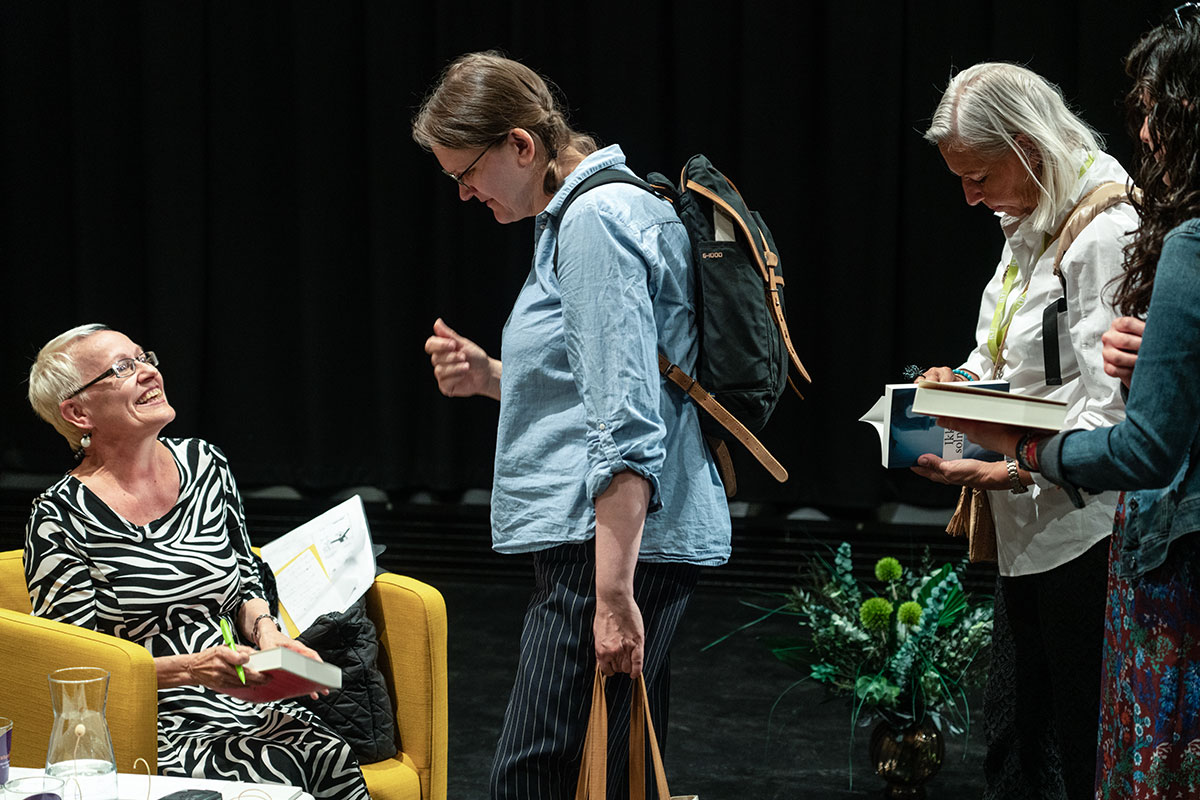
LiteratureXcange Festival in Aarhus (Denmark 2023)

=== Novels ===
- Ennen päivänlaskua ei voi (2000), translated as Not Before Sundown, 2003 (American edition Troll — A Love Story, 2004)
- Sankarit (2003)
- Lasisilmä (2006)
- Linnunaivot (2008), translated as Birdbrain (2011)
- Möbiuksen maa (2010)
- Enkelten verta (2011), translated as The Blood of Angels (2014; ISBN 978-0-7206-1004-8)
- Salattuja voimia (2012)
- Auringon ydin (2013), translated as The Core of the Sun (2016, ISBN 978-0-8021-2464-7).
- Iron Sky - Renaten tarina (2018)
- Vieraat (2020)
- Ukkoshuilu (2021)

=== Short fiction ===
==== Short story collections ====
Kädettömät kuninkaat ja muita häiritseviä tarinoita (2005)

==== Anthologies, multiple authors ====
- Vuosirengas 74 (1974)
  - short stories Kilometripylväät and Jäinen kaupunki
- Jäinen vaeltaja (1986)
  - short stories Tarina kuolleesta metsästä and Sorsapuisto
- Atoroxin perilliset (1988)
  - short stories Hanna, Yövesi and Suklaalaput
- Ensimmäinen yhteys (1988)
  - short story Transit
- Illan tähti yksinäinen (1991) edited by Raija Hämäläinen
  - short story Illan tähti yksinäinen
- Kultainen naamio (1993)
  - short story Me vakuutamme sinut
- Onnellinen kuolema (1996)
  - mini novel Tango merellä
- Linnées boreales (2001)
  - short story (French) Le Transit
- Kärlek på finska (2002)
  - short story (Swedish) Låset
- Intohimosta rikokseen (2002)
  - short story Baby Doll
- Utopiae 2005 (2005)
  - short story (French) Baby Doll

=== Editor ===
- Verkon silmässä (2005; a selection of short stories about the internet from several writers)
- The Dedalus Book of Finnish Fantasy (2005, translated by David Hackston; a selection of Finnish weird fiction)
- Giants at the End of the World: A Showcase of the Finnish Weird (2017, co-edited with Toni Jerrman; a selection of Finnish speculative fiction from the 19th century to the present day)

=== Television ===
- Toinen todellisuus, TV2, 1991
- Maa on litteä, TV2, 1992
- Tulevaisuuden kuvia, TV2, 1995
- Ainoa elämä, TV2, 1997
- Elämän suola, TV 2, 1995
- Samaa sukua, eri maata, MTV3, 1997
- SunRadio, TV1, 1998
- Salatut elämät, MTV3
- Kotikatu, TV1
- Käenpesä, MTV3

=== Comics ===
- Tiskivuoro, art by Hannu Mänttäri
- Muumimamman vaarallinen nuoruus, art by Ilkka Ruohola
- Several Moomin comics, different artists
- Pikku eläinpuoti in Oma Ystävä magazine, art by Hannu Mänttäri
- Kimppakämppä in Trendi magazine, art by Johanna Rojola
