= Toni Jerrman =

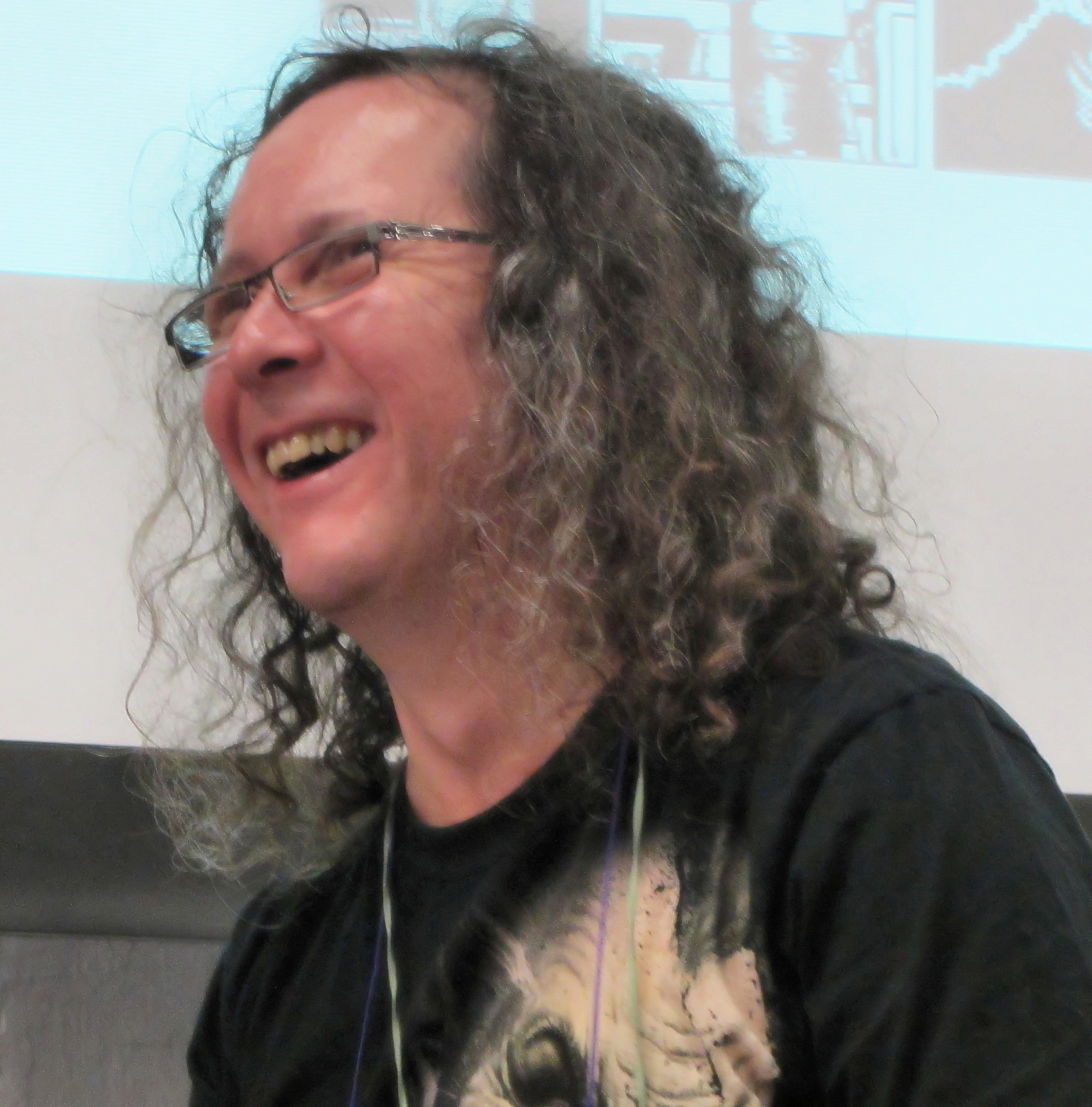
Toni Jerrman

Toni Jerrman (born 1964) is critic and editor of the Finnish sci-fi magazine Tähtivaeltaja. He founded the Tähtivaeltaja and Tähtifantasia Awards.

He has won several awards, including:

- The Arctic Comic Festival's Publication-Lempi for Tähtivaeltaja (1998)
- Dark Fantasy's Golden Chainsaw for the best horror print (short story anthology Himon anatomia, edited by Jerrman) (1998)
- The Finnish Science Fiction Writers Association's Cosmos Pen reward for promoting Finnish sci-fi literature (1992)
- European Science Fiction Society's European Science Fiction Award: Best chief editor (1988)

== See also ==
- Fanzine
- Science fiction fandom
