= MikroBitti =

Finnish computer magazine

Mikrobitti
- Editor: Harri Junttila 2020–
- Categories: Computer magazines
- Frequency: Monthly
- Circulation: Readers 74 000 / 198 000 (paper/+digital) (2022)
- Founded: 1984; 42 years ago
- Company: Alma Talent 2016–
- Country: Finland
- Based in: Helsinki
- Language: Finnish
- Website: www.mikrobitti.fi
- ISSN: 0781-2078

Mikrobitti (formerly called MB, MikroBitti and MikroBITTI) is a monthly Finnish computer magazine published in Helsinki, Finland.

== History and profile ==
MikroBITTI was first published in May 1984. The original publisher was Tecnopress. Later it was published by Helsinki Media Company. Then the magazine was published monthly by Sanoma Magazines. The publishers were divisions of the Sanoma Group, since Sanoma purchased Tecnopress in 1984. MikroBitti is aimed mainly at beginner to mid-level computer users.

The computer platform coverage in MikroBitti has shifted according to the market and public interest over the years. Originally, in the mid-1980s, the magazine covered 8-bit home computers such as the Commodore 64, the MSX line and the ZX Spectrum. In the late 1980s and early 1990s, the focus shifted to 16- and 32-bit home computers such as the Amiga and the Atari ST.

In the 8-bit era, MikroBitti was very hobby-oriented, presenting type-in programs for home computers and home electronics projects. Some columns, like the famous Peliluola by Nordic the Incurable, were written in a subculture insider style, and obscure in-jokes such as exploding hamsters were occasionally used. Many of the staff were fans of Star Trek: The Original Series and sometimes even wrote entire articles about the show, which had little or nothing to do with home computers.

In the 2000s, the magazine was renamed to MB and mainly covered PCs and games consoles. It also reviewed other hardware, such as digital cameras.

In 2015, Sanoma sold MB to Talentum, which had also acquired Sanoma's other computer magazine Tietokone in 2013. In the process, the magazine was renamed to Mikrobitti. In September 2015 Alma Media Corporation acquired Talentum.

Risto Hieta became famous by the name Nordic the Incurable as the writer of the Peliluola ("The Gaming Den") column in MikroBitti.

== Circulation ==
In 2003 MikroBitti had the largest circulation figures of computer magazines published in the Nordic countries. The 2011 circulation of the monthly was 71,429 copies. The circulation was 42,866 copies in 2013 and 35,293 in 2016. In 2022, current readership calculation methods estimate the number of Mikrobitti readers at 74 000 (paper) and 198 000 (paper and digital).

== Summer camp ==
In the 1980s, the MikroBitti staff used to hold an annual summer camp in Lautsia, a small village in the Kanta-Häme region in southern Finland. The camp was open to all MikroBitti readers, with a registration fee, and lasted about a week. Each day consisted of computer programming classes taught by the magazine staff. In the beginning, the class used various 8-bit computers such as the Commodore 64 and the MSX, but these were later replaced with Amiga computers. In the evening, the camp offered common summer camp outdoor activities, although attendees generally spent most of their free time playing computer games. The last summer camp was held in 1991. Jyrki Kasvi, a longtime contributor to MikroBitti, has mentioned having found many summer camp attendees at executive positions in Finnish IT companies.

== Illuminatus ==
In 1989, MikroBitti reviewed a fictional German space-themed computer game Illuminatus, designed by one "Jürgen Sternreise" (which loosely translates to John Star Trek), as an April fools' joke. Illuminatus supposedly starts out as a single-player spaceflight simulator and then expands into a massive multi-player strategy game. It was hailed as the greatest game ever. The magazine staff had made up the entire story, including convincing screenshots. It was basically just a wish list of gaming greatness, but few readers seemed to realize this. Instead Illuminatus became a local phenomenon. Its name quickly appeared in Finnish mail order advertisements and even foreign distributors called the magazine to express interest in the game. Later there have been a couple of attempts to implement the fictional game, including one by Future Crew, which was not finished. Skrolli magazine independently implemented a playable demo of Illuminatus, based on recreated graphics from the 1989 MikroBitti article, and published it on the virtual cover disk of the first Skrolli International Edition in 2016.

== Mainstream shift ==
Later, when the magazine grew more popular, its orientation and style became more mainstream. In the mid-2000s the magazine branded itself more as a technology than a computer magazine. One of the latest moves was the complete removal of the games section, and putting the remaining few game reviews and news among other hardware tests and news sections. For gamers this was unfortunate, because MikroBitti had always offered significant support to unusual games and independent publishers. The game section returned in the December issue, but the number of games reviewed was significantly lower than before. All these changes were related to the merger of HIFI and MikroBitti magazines.

When Talentum bought the magazine in 2015, the new publisher changed the focus back to computers. In his first editorial, editor-in-chief Mikko Torikka promised that the newly relaunched Mikrobitti would not write about lawnmowers and razors unless somebody programmed one to play Rick Astley's "Never Gonna Give You Up". (Soon one of the readers really made a shaver to play the song.)

== Spin-offs ==
MikroBitti also produced spin-off magazines: C-lehti, Tietokonepelien vuosikirja, Pelit and Peliasema.

== See also ==
List of magazines in Finland
