= Wallu =

Finnish cartoonist

Harri Sakari Vaalio (born 1956 in Järvelä, Kärkölä, Finland), also known by his artist name Wallu, is a Finnish cartoonist. He is known for his strip Punaniska (Finnish for "redneck") comic albums and his strips in Finnish magazines such as the Mikrokivikausi (Finnish for "Micro Stone Age") strip in the computer magazine MikroBitti. He has also written and drawn 12 Winnie the Pooh stories for the Finnish Winnie the Pooh magazine in 1986–1988. His other comics includes Hessu-kissa (1985–), Armas, also known as Lämsänperäläiset (1977–), and KyöPelit (1993–). In the early 1980s he was a teacher in the local elementary school, now known as Vuokkoharjun ala-aste.
