= List of Alvar Aalto's works =

Alvar Aalto (1898–1976) was a Finnish architect, and one of the key figures of modernist architecture during the twentieth century. In addition to architecture, his oeuvre includes furniture, textiles and glassware. A full annotated encyclopedia of his entire works was compiled by his biographer Göran Schildt, Alvar Aalto, A Life's work: Architecture, Design and Art (1994).

== Buildings ==
=== 1917-1919 ===
Year	Name	Location	Country	Notes
1917	Park café			Exercise while at the Helsinki University of Technology
1918	House	Alajärvi	Finland	For his parents
1918–1919 (Note: Some sources give 1921 as the date for this project.)	Church and belfry	Kauhajärvi, Lapua	Finland	Two separate plans were created with the first being the belfry alone and the second the entire church. The second was not utilized.
1919	Shop renovation	Alajärvi	Finland	Since demolished
1919	Hoisko shop renovation	Alajärvi	Finland	Not carried out
1919	Soldiers' Memorial	Alajärvi, Töysä, and Kemi	Finland	Alajärvi was the only chosen design. (Note: Aalto enlarged the site in 1955.)
1919	Youth Association Building	Alajärvi	Finland	Was damaged by fire in the 1970s, but has since been restored. (Note: Has changed named from the Youth Association Building to the Defence Corps Building, to the present Club Building.)
1919	Municipal granary			Training assignment while at the Helsinki University of Technology

=== 1920-1929 ===
Year	Name	Location	Country	Notes
1920	Grand Hotel Adalmina	Helsinki	Finland	Another university exercise
1920	Soldiers' Memorial	Oulu	Finland	No drawings survive
1920?	Town hall	Jyväskylä	Finland	Training assignment while at the Helsinki University of Technology
1920?	Town hall	Iisalmi	Finland	Competition piece with no surviving drawings (Note: Did not win the competition.)
1920's	Sick ward for retirement home	Jyväskylä	Finland	Sketches (Note: Never completed)
1920's	Sauna	Töysä	Finland	Built for Terho Manner (mother's cousin). (Note: The building has since been destroyed.)
1920–1921	Vicarage	Töysä	Finland	Drawings are lost
1920–1923	Elementary school	Kauhajärvi and Lappajärvi	Finland	Renovation
1921	Screen for the Old Student House	Helsinki	Finland	Never completed
1921	Theater	Helsinki	Finland	Kansan Näyttämö Theater
1921–1922 (Note: Some sources give dates of 1924–1929 and refer to it as the Seinäjoki Defence Corps Building.)	Association of Patriots Building	Seinäjoki	Finland	
1922	Industrial Exposition	Tampere	Finland	
1922–1923	2-family house	Jyväskylä	Finland	
1923	Church	Toivakka	Finland	Restoration
1923 (Note: Some sources give an end date of 1924.)	Finnish Parliament House and restaurant	Helsinki	Finland	Competition project
1923	Gate and fence of the garrison	Kouvola	Finland	Plans lost (Note: Gate still standing.)
1923	Siting for the Finnish Parliament House	Helsinki	Finland	Anonymous entry presumed to be Aalto's.
1923–1924	Library wing	Helsinki	Finland	Part of the Parliament House plan
1923–1924	Apartment building	Jyväskylä	Finland	
1923–1924?	Gravestones			Sketches of 20+ tombs and some with pen. Unknown if any were used.
1923–1925 (Note: Some sources say that 1924 was the year of this project and it is referred to as the Workers' Club.)	Trade Union Houses and Theater	Jyväskylä	Finland	Has been restored (Note: Has evolved from The Workers' Club to a Worker's Theater to a City Theater, along with first a cafe then a restaurant, and now a meeting hall and restaurant.)
1924	Bandstand	Seinäjoki	Finland	Separate building behind the Defence Corps Building
1924	Petrol station	Jyväskylä	Finland	
1924	Song Festival	Jyväskylä	Finland	Archways, fountains, and a concert stand in Lounaispuisto Park
1924	Church	Äänekoski	Finland	Remodel of the church and furniture for the parish cafeteria. (Note: The church was destroyed by fire in 1968 and the plans were misplaced; therefore there are no surviving examples of this particular project.)
1924	Church	Pertunmaa	Finland	Renovation
1924	Simunamkoski Fishery	Laukaa	Finland	Never completed
1924–1928	Municipal Hospital	Alajärvi	Finland	Original plan overhauled by building office chief.
1924–1929 (Note: Some sources give dates of 1926–1929 or 1927–1929 and some also refer to it as the Association of Patriots Building.)	Jyväskylä Defence Corps Building	Jyväskylä	Finland	
1925	Seurahuone Café	Jyväskylä	Finland	Conversion of portion of the Defence Corps building into Café
1925	Café	Jyväskylä	Finland	Renovation of cafè into three shops
1925	Church	Pertunmaa	Finland	Same church as above; however these plans called for an entirely new church to be built.
1925?	Church			located in the drawings for the Defence Corps Building.
1925	Church	Jämsä	Finland	Competition project
1925	Church	Viitasaari	Finland	Remodel
1925	Public restroom	Jyväskylä	Finland	Lounaipuisto Park
1925 (Note: Some sources say 1924, while others give a range from 1924–1926.)	Church	Anttola	Finland	Restoration
1925	Retirement home	Säynäätsalo	Finland	Two separate sketches
1925–1927	Taulumäki Church	Jyväskylä	Finland	Unbidden before the contest in 1927, Aalto submitted this plan .
1925–1930	Funeral chapel	Jyväskylä	Finland	Two separate plans.
1926	Villa Flora	Alajärvi	Finland	Aino Aalto
1926	2 kiosks	Jyväskylä	Finland	Demolished since
1926	Rauhanyhdistys (Peace Society Building)	Jyväskylä	Finland	
1926	Vicarage	Jyväskylä	Finland	Four different entries in the competition
1926	Jyväskylä Savings Bank	Jyväskylä	Finland	Several proposals
1926	Power plant	Imatra	Finland	Never completed
1926	Casa Väinö Aalto	Alajärvi	Finland	
1926	Church	Tampere	Finland	Remodel
1926	Union Bank	Helsinki	Finland	Competition piece<group=nb name=nw/>
1926	Town plan	Keuruu	Finland	Plans no longer in existence
1926–1927	Town plan	Jämsä	Finland	Sammallahti industrial estate
1926–1927	League of Nations (Palais des Nations)	Geneva	Switzerland	Sketches for a competition only
1926–1927	Korpilahti Church	Korpilahti	Finland	Majority of Aalto's work was not completed
1926–1928 (Note: Some sources state that the project was either 1927 or 1926.)	Church and Bell-Tower	Pylkönmäki	Finland	Restoration of church and construction of bell tower
1927?	Health spa	Pärnu	Estonia	Competition piece that only some early sketches are all that survived.
1927	Service station and newsstand	Jyväskylä	Finland	No longer in existence
1927	Renovation of retirement home	Pihlajavesi?	Finland	Unfinished pencil sketches only
1927	Church	Ristiina	Finland	Plans did not survive.
1927	Meat inspection building	Jyväskylä	Finland	
1927	Kinkomaa Sanatorium	Kinkomaa, Muurame	Finland	Competition entry
1927	Office block	Vaasa	Finland	Competition project with Erik Bryggman
1927	Church	Töölö	Finland	Competition project
1927	Vicarage	Töölö	Finland	Competition project
1927	Church	Viinikka, Tampere	Finland	Competition project
1927	Vicarage	Viinikka, Tampere	Finland	Competition project
1927	Taulumäki Church	Jyväskylä	Finland	Competition project (Note: Aalto submitted two separate plans for this project.)
1927	Parish center	Jyväskylä	Finland	Competition
1927	Kangas Paper Mill office	Jyväskylä	Finland	Renovations only
1927–1928 (Note: Some sources state that the project began in 1926.)	Southwestern Agricultural Cooperative Building	Turku	Finland	Competition winner which also contained a theater, hotel, bank, shops, offices, and flats.
1927–1929 (Note: Some sources state that this project began in 1926.)	Muurame church	Muurame	Finland	
1927–1929	Block of apartments	Turku	Finland	
1927–1935 (Note: Some sources give the date for the project as 1933–1935.) (Note: Some sources break this project into two separate as the first plans from 1927 were essentially completely redone for the final work from 1933 which was used to build in 1935.)	Municipal Library	Vyborg	Russia	Competition piece (Note: Some sources state that the library was destroyed during the Second World War; however it was only severely damaged.)
1928	Summer houses			Aitta magazine competition
1928	Independence monument	Tähtitorninmäki Hill, Helsinki	Finland	Competition piece
1928	Two separate service station	Jyväskylä	Finland	Both have since been replaced
1928	Perniö Museum	Perniö	Finland	Competition piece
1928	Suomen Biografi Cinema	Turku	Finland	Never built
1928 (Note: Some sources give the date of 1929, while others give a range of 1926–1929.)	Church	Kemijärvi	Finland	Restoration with Erik Bryggman (Note: Destroyed during the war in 1945.)
1929	Exposition Building	Turku	Finland	Seventh centenary, with Erik Bryggman.
1929	Choir platform	Turku	Finland	A portion of the 700 year celebration plan
1929 (Note: Some sources give a start date of 1928.)	Columbus Lighthouse	Santo Domingo Este	Dominican Republic	Competition project
1929	Church	Vallila, Helsinki	Finland	Competition project
1929	Parish center	Vallila, Helsinki	Finland	Competition project
1929	Nordic Union Bank	Helsinki	Finland	Summary sketches only
1929	Tuberculosis Sanatorium	Kälviä	Finland	Competition piece.
1929	Office Building	Turku	Finland	
1929	Parish center	Tehtanpuisto Parish Center, Helsinki	Finland	Competition piece
1929–1930	G.A. Serlachius building	Mänttä	Finland	Competition piece
1929–1933 (Note: Some sources state 1929 as the date of significance, where others give an end date of 1932.)	Tuberculosis Sanatorium	Paimio	Finland	Competition piece

=== 1930-1939 ===
Year	Name	Location	Country	Notes
Early 1930s	Telephone booth	Jyväskylä	Finland	Never built
1930	Institute for Physical Education	Vierumäki	Finland	Competition project
1930	Parish center	Pöytyä	Finland	
1930	Tehtanpuisto Church	Helsinki	Finland	Competition project commemorating Mikael Agricola
1930	Technical museum	Mänttä	Finland	Part of the G.A. Serlachius headquarters
1930	Water tower	Turku	Finland	Competition piece
1930	Stadium and sports center	Helsinki	Finland	Competition project for the placement of the stadium.
c. 1930 (Note: Some sources state a year for this project of 1931.)	Furniture building	Turku	Finland	Annex to Huonekalu-ja Rakennustyötehdas Oy company's building
1930 (Note: Some sources state that designing started in 1923 or 1928 while others give only 1927 as the year of work.)	Turun-Sanomat Building	Turku	Finland	Competition piece
1930–1931 (Note: Some sources give an end date of 1933.)	Toppila Pulp Mill	Oulu	Finland	
1931	Offices at Toppila Pulp Mill	Oulu	Finland	3 separate plans for new buildings and the chosen plan, which was for renovations
1931 (Note: Some sources give a date of 1928.)	Tomb	Helsinki	Finland	Professor Usko Nystro
1931 (Note: Some sources state 1930, or 1930–1931 as the dates.)	Central University Hospital	Zagreb	Croatia	Competition piece
1931	University of Helsinki	Helsinki	Finland	Competition for enlargement.
1931–1932	Crichton-Vulcan shipyard	Turku	Finland	Unknown assignment
1932 (Note: Some sources give dates of 1932–1933.)	Villa Tammekann	Tartu	Estonia	Residence of Estonian geographer August Tammekann.
1932	Defence Corps Building	Kemi	Finland	Never built
1932	Prefabricated one-family house			Competition project
1932	Prototype weekend cabin design			Competition project for Enso-Gutzeit
1932	Sauna	Paimio	Finland	For the Tuberculosis Sanatorium's chief physician
1932	Tehtanpuisto Church	Helsinki	Finland	Second competition for the church. (Note: Aalto never finished the work beyond preliminary sketches.)
1932–1933	Employee housing	Paimio	Finland	for the Sanatorium
1933	Redevelopment plan	Norrmalm, Stockholm	Sweden	Competition project
1933	Helsinki Stadium	Helsinki	Finland	Competition for the first round, where he did not win but was invited to try in the final round.
1933	Helsinki Stadium	Helsinki	Finland	Competition for the final round.
1933	Parish café	Loimaa	Finland	
1933	Railroad station	Helsinki	Finland	Competition project
1934	Graveyard	Malmi, Helsinki	Finland	Competition piece
1934 (Note: Some sources state that the dates were 1934–1935, with additional plans being produced in 1938.)	Stenius housing development	Munkkiniemi, Helsinki	Finland	Competition piece
1934	Project for the Railroad Station	Tampere	Finland	Competition piece
1934	National Exhibition Hall	Helsinki	Finland	Competition project
1934	Main post office	Helsinki	Finland	Competition piece
1934	Corso Theater, Restaurant	Zürich	Switzerland	
1935	Alppiharju open-air theater	Lenininpuisto (Lenin Park), Helsinki	Finland	Probably completed
1935 (Note: Some sources are unclear on the dates involved, as they state that Ahto died in 1926 and the monument was erected in 1937.)	Tomb	Hietaniemi cemetery, Helsinki	Finland	Architect Ahto Virtanen
1935	Kalastajatorppa Restaurant	Helsinki	Finland	M.G. Stenius
1935	Alphyddan Restaurant renovation	Helsinki	Finland	Later destroyed in fire
1935	Finnish Legation Building	Moscow	Russia	Competition piece
1935–1936	Central warehouse and factory	Kyläsaari, Helsinki	Finland	Competition piece for the state alcohol company
1935–1936 (Note: Some sources give dates of 1934–1935.)	House	Munkkiniemi, Helsinki	Finland	Aalto's House at Munkkiniemi
1936 (Note: Some sources give an end date of 1937 and refer to this as both workmen's houses, but more importantly the first heating plant, with fire house.)	Workmen's Houses	Kotka	Finland	For the Sunila Factory
1936	Association and Club houses	Oulu	Finland	Toppila Company
1936	Traffic system			Patent office refused to give patent
1936–1937	Bus station	Sunila, Kotka	Finland	Since replaced
1936–1937 (Note: Some sources state 1937 only as the year the work was done.)	The Savoy Restaurant	Helsinki	Finland	Renovation and furnishing
1936–1937 (Note: Some sources state that the end date was 1945.)	City Plan	Varkaus	Finland	Collaboration
1936–1939 (Note: Some sources give 1936 as the date for this portion of the project; and others give 1936–1937 or 1936–1938.)	Cellulose Factory	Sunila, Kotka	Finland	Ahlstrom Company
1936–1953	Master plan	Sunila, Kotka	Finland	Plan for the entire industrial community
1937	Garage for workshop	Inkeroinen	Finland	Tampella
1937 (Note: Some sources give the date as 1934.)	Project for Museum of Art	Tallinn	Estonia	Competition piece
1937	Beach facilities	Lillaholmen Island, near Mariehamn, Åland	Finland	Never built
1937	Beach café	Mariehamm, Åland	Finland	Part of the beach facilities
1937	Sauna	Kotka	Finland	For the works manager along with a boathouse that was not built.
1937	Sauna	Kotka	Finland	For the engineers
1937	Pirtti Cultural Center	Kotka	Finland	Renovation for Sunila
1937 (Note: Some sources give an end date of 1938.)	Nordic Union Bank	Karhula	Finland	
1937	Finnish Pavilion at the International Exposition	Paris	France	Competition piece
1937	Sauna complex	Varkaus	Finland	Main complex of the Ahlström Company
1937–1938	Sauna	Kotka	Finland	Main sauna complex
1937–1938	Director's house	Kotka	Finland	
1937–1945	Master plan	Karhula	Finland	Town plan also (Note: Major portions of the plan were never built.)
1937–1950	Master plan	Anjalankoski	Finland	Requested by Tampella industrial group.
1938	Sauna	Kotka	Finland	For the housing area of the heating plant.
1938	Defence Corps Building	Jalasjärvi, Härmä	Finland	Never completed
1938	Master plan	Kauttua, Eura	Finland	Ahlström corporation
1938	Forestry pavilion for the Agricultural Fair	Lapua	Finland	
1938	Heating plant	Sunila, Kotka	Finland	Second phase of the heating plants along with a public sauna
1938	Blomberg Film Studio	Westend	Finland	Competition project
1938	Tampella office building	Inkeroinen	Finland	
1938	Storehouse	Inkeroinen	Finland	Pasila Manor
1938 (Note: Some sources give a start of 1937, as there was two separate competitions, neither of which Aalto won.)	University of Helsinki library extension	Helsinki	Finland	Competition project
1938–1939 (Note: Some sources give 1937–1938 as the dates, and refer to the project as 2-story houses and 2-story terrace housing.)	Dwellings	Southern Kymi	Finland	
1938–1939 (Note: Some sources state that the dates involved are 1938–1941.)	Villa Mairea	Noormarkku	Finland	Gullichsen House
1938–1939	Ahlström works	Kotka	Finland	
1938–1939 (Note: Some sources give 1938 as the year, while other sources say 1937–1938.)	Anjala Paper Mill	Inkeroinen	Finland	
1938–1939 (Note: Some sources give 1938 as the only date for this project.)	Elementary school	Inkeroinen	Finland	
1938–1939	Workmen apartments and engineer housing	Inkeroinen	Finland	
1938–1940 (Note: Some sources state that this project started in 1937.)	Terrace housing	Kauttua, Eura	Finland	
1938–1941	3-story terrace housing	Kotka	Finland	
1939	Sauna	Karhula	Finland	Anders Kramer's retreat.
1939 (Note: Some sources state that work began in 1938.)	Finnish Pavilion at World's Fair	New York City	United States	Competition piece
1939–1945	Employee Housing	Karhula	Finland	
Undated plans	Södra verken plant	Avesta	Sweden	Collaborated with Albin Stark

=== 1940-1949 ===
Year	Name	Location	Country	Notes
1940	Project for an Experimental House			
1940	Sauna	Varkaus	Finland	For the youth summer camp. Unknown if ever built.
1940–1941	Pumping station	Inkeroinen	Finland	Anjala
1941	Sauna and laundry	Inkeroinen	Finland	Tampella company.
1941	Sauna and laundry	Tampere	Finland	Part of the War Veteran's Village
1941	Standard house factory	Varkaus	Finland	Commissioned by Ahlström, but unknown if ever completed as plans have been lost
1941	Head office for Ahlström	Varkaus	Finland	Project was dropped due to the war
1941	Outline plan	Noormarkku	Finland	
1941 (Note: Some sources date this at 1940, and refer to it as both the HAKA housing development and traffic plan and design of Erottaja Square.)	Project for a District	Hakaniemi	Finland	Competition piece
1941 (Note: Some sources state that Aalto started in 1940.)	Plan for an experimental town			Project worked on with MIT students
1942	Garage	Kauttua	Finland	Ahlström
1942	Kindergarten	Noormarkku	Finland	Renovation per Ahlström
1942	Sawmill	Inkeroinen	Finland	Tampella
1942	Warehouse extension	Varkaus	Finland	Plans have been lost
1942–1943 (Note: Some sources give dates of 1940 or 1941–1942.)	Regional Plan for the Valley	Kokemäki, Harjavalta, Nakkila, Noormarkku, Ulvila, Kullaa, and Pori	Finland	For the Ahlström company
1942–1943	Women's dormitory	Kauttua	Finland	
1942–1943	Paper cloth mill	Kauttua	Finland	Ahlström
1942–1943	Bleaching plant	Varkaus	Finland	Ahlström
1942–1943	Restaurant and service buildings	Helsinki	Finland	Commissioned by Strömberg
1942–1945	Master plan	Kymijoki River valley, Kotka	Finland	
1942–1945?	Workshop and storehouse	Varkaus	Finland	Built for Ahlström
1942–1949 (Note: Some sources state that the end date was either between 1944 and 1947.)	Community Plan	Säynätsalo	Finland	
1942–1951 (Note: Some sources give a start date of 1941, with a breakdown as thus: 1941: Original design, 1942: temporary wooden building, 1950–1951: permanent replacement. Also referred to as an entrance only.)	Shopping Center and Public Baths	Helsinki	Finland	Created from the entrance to an underground bomb shelter.
1943?	Area plan	Rieskala and Pihlava districts in Pori	Finland	Commissioned by the Ahlström company
1943?	Sauna	Pihlava, Pori	Finland	Commissioned by Ahlström.
1943	Sawmill	Inkeroinen	Finland	Tampella
1943	Glassworks renovations	Karhula	Finland	Ahlström
1943 (Note: Some sources give a date of 1942.)	Merikoski Power Plant	Oulu	Finland	Competition project, awarded to Bertel Strömmer
1943?	Office building	Kauttua	Finland	Missing plans and unknown if ever completed
1943	Invalids' home	Varkaus	Finland	Hired by Ahlström company. Drawings lost and unknown if ever completed.
1943	Glassworks warehouse	Karhula	Finland	Ahlström
1943–1944	Distillery, pumping station, tanks	Varkaus	Finland	Ahström
1943–1945?	Canal bridge	Oulu	Finland	Part of the River Rapids Center
1943–1945 (Note: Some sources state 1945 only.) (Note: Other sources give a date of only 1943.)	River Rapids Center	Oulu River	Finland	Collaborated with Yrjö Lindegren and Viljo Revell
1943–1947	Master plan	Huutoniemi, Vaasa	Finland	commissioned by Strömberg
1943–1949	Gatehouse and office building	Helsinki	Finland	Strömberg
1944	Master plan	Avesta	Finland	Competition piece (in collaboration with Albin Stark)
1944	Bus station master plan		Sweden	Collaborated with Albin Stark
1944	Town center	Avesta	Finland	Albin Stark collaboration
1944	Storehouse	Inkeroinen	Finland	Anjala
1944	Theater and concert hall	Avesta	Finland	A piece of the preceding town plan
1944	Temporary housing	Kauttua	Finland	Ahlström
1944	Town hall	Avesta	Finland	A piece of the preceding town plan
1944	Villa Tvistbo			Unbuilt project
1944	Kindergarten	Kauttua	Finland	Commissioned by Ahlström
1944	Open-air theater and Avesta Hall auditorium	Avesta	Finland	Part of the Johnson Institute plan
1944	Museum	Avesta	Finland	Part of the Johnson Institute plan (Note: There were in actuality three different projects relating to museums with the Johnson Institute: The Bergslagen Mining Museum, the Seafaring Museum, and a group of ships' figureheads, all of which were not finished.)
Mid 1940s	Sauna	Inkeroinen	Finland	Commissioned by Tampella corporation for the works manager, built with revised plans.
1944–1946	Sauna	Kauttua	Finland	Commissioned by Ahlström
1944–1946	Area plan	Neula area, Pitäjänmäki, Helsinki	Finland	No plans survive
1944–1947	Apartments (Note: Some sources refer to this as both the Strömberg housing development and meter factory and terrace housing.)	Vaasa	Finland	For the Strömberg
1944-1945	Villa Åke Gartz	Siuntio	Finland	Commissioned by Ahlström.
Mid 1940s	Soldiers' Tomb	Kemi	Finland	Little details known.
1945 (Note: Some sources give a date of 1944.)	Tomb	Hietaniemi cemetery, Helsinki	Finland	Architect Uno Ulberg (Note: In 1958 a smaller monument was added for Ullberg's wife Johanna Elisabeth.)
1945	Master plan	Vanaja	Finland	Plan for Yhteissisu industrial and housing complex
1945	Master plan	Iittala community	Finland	Iittala company
1945	Metal workshop	Inkeroinen	Finland	Anjala
1945	Bridge and street lamps	Säynätsalo	Finland	Part of the master plan
1945	Workshop	Jyväskylä	Finland	Commissioned by Kymin Uittoyhdistys
1945	Master plan	Tornio	Finland	Preserved only in sketches.
1945	Town hall	Nynäshamn	Sweden	Part of the overall town plan
1945	Factory buildings	Hedemora	Sweden	Collaborated with Albin Stark and I. Norman
1945–1946 (Note: Some sources give 1944 as the date and refer to this project as a health center.)	Hospital	Noormarkku	Finland	For the Ahlström Company
1945–1946	Cardboard mill expansion	Inkeroinen	Finland	Anjala
1945–1947 (Note: Some sources give 1944–1945 as the year, and refer to the project as an extension to factory, mechanical workshops, engineer housing, and sauna.)	Living Quarters and Factory	Karhula	Finland	Expansion of the Ahlström Factory
1945–1948	Warehouse, packing plant and expansion	Huutoniemi, Vaasa	Finland	Strömberg
1945–1949 (Note: some sources state 1949 as the date.)	Storage Warehouse Project (Note: Plans started as a seven story warehouse, which was subsequently reduced to the current one-story model.)	Karhula	Finland	Glass factory
1945–1949 (Note: Other sources give dates of 1945–1946, or 1944–1945 and only mention the sawmill.)	Sawmill and Director Residence	Varkaus	Finland	Ahlström Company
1945-late 1950s	Town plan	Alby and Huvudsta in Solna	Sweden	Commissioned by the Valvet company.
1946 (Note: Some sources give a date of 1938, with the 1946 date representing a roof replacement.)	Sauna	Noormarkku	Finland	At Villa Mairea
1946	Board shed	Huutoniemi, Vaasa	Finland	Strömberg
1946	Transformer	Huutoniemi, Vaasa	Finland	Strömberg
1946	Two-story office wing	Inkeroinen	Finland	Anjala Paper Factory
1946	Plant expansion	Inkeroinen	Finland	Anjala
1946	Conveyor and entrance hall	Inkeroinen	Finland	Anjala
1946	Debarking plant	Inkeroinen	Finland	Anjala
1946	Foundry	Varkaus	Finland	
1946	Sauna	Varkaus	Finland	Along with a boathouse.
1946 (Note: Some sources state that 1945 was the year for this project.)	Exhibition Pavilion	Hedemora	Sweden	Artek Company
1946 (Note: Some sources state that this project ran from 1943–1946.)	Town plan	Nynäshamn	Sweden	Collaborated with Albin Stark
1946	Heimdal housing development	Nynäshamn	Sweden	Competition project with Albin Stark
1946	House	Pihlava	Finland	
1946–1947	Area plan	Ruotsinpyhtää area	Finland	Commissioned by Ahlström
1946–1948 (Note: Some sources date this project as starting in 1944 and ending in either 1945 or 1946.)	Reconstruction Plan	Rovaniemi	Finland	Competition piece, with Yrjö Lindegren, Saarnio, Tavio, and Simberg
1947 (Note: Some sources give a date of 1944.)	Johnson Institute	Avesta	Sweden	Project
1947	Work shed	Inkeroinen	Finland	Anjala
1947	Church	Brooklyn, New York	United States	Plans did not survive.
1947 (Note: Some sources give dates of 1946–1948.)	Sauna and laundry	Vaasa	Finland	Strömberg
1947	Oil warehouse	Helsinki	Finland	Strömberg
1947	Bus station	Inkeroinen	Finland	Tampella
1947	Bus station with ticket booth	Karhunkangas, Inkeroinen	Finland	Tampella
1947	Transformer	Huutoniemi, Vaasa	Finland	Strömberg
1947	Weighing station	Huutoniemi, Vaasa	Finland	Strömberg
1947	Bicycle shelter	Huutoniemi, Vaasa	Finland	Strömberg
1947	Entrance canopy and tank	Huutoniemi, Vaasa	Finland	Strömberg
1947	Drying plant	Inkeroinen	Finland	Later converted into staff facilities
1947–1949 (Note: Some sources state the project dates of 1947–1948.)	Baker House Dormitory	Cambridge, Massachusetts	United States	MIT
1947–1948	Fire station and garage	Inkeroinen	Finland	Anjala
1947–1948	Workshop expansion	Karhula	Finland	Collaborated with Gunnar Aspelin for Ahlström
1948 (Note: Some sources give an end date of 1952.)	First Project for the Old Age Pension Building (Note: Originally called Forum Redivivum: Cultural and Administrative Center.)	Helsinki	Finland	
1948	Sibelius Concert Hall	Helsinki	Finland	Part of the "First Project for the Old Age Pension Building"
1948	Garage	Helsinki	Finland	for US Embassy
1948	Grave	Jyväskylä	Finland	Sketches specifying how to redo his mother's and aunt's grave. (Sally and Wilhelmina Aalto)
1948	Sauna Annex	Inkeroinen	Finland	Commissioned by Tampella.
1948–1949	Glassworks warehouse	Karhula	Finland	Ahlström
1949 (Note: Some sources give dates of 1949–1955 for the entire project including the tennis courts and stadium from 1950–1951.)	Finnish Technical High School	Otaniemi	Finland	
1949	Helsinki University of Technology	Helsinki	Finland	Competition project
1949	Bus station	Imatra	Finland	Part of the Town center
1949	Passenger terminal	Helsinki	Finland	Competition
1949	Woodberry Poetry Room	Harvard, Cambridge	United States	
1949 (Note: Some sources state 1947 as the year for this project,) (Note: Other sources give a date range of 1947–1953.)	Regional Plan	Imatra	Finland	Never built
1949	Town Hall and Administration Center	Imatra	Finland	Never built
1949	Cultural Center	Imatra	Finland	Never built
1949	Theater	Imatra	Finland	Part of the Imatra Cultural Center
1949	Library	Imatra	Finland	Part of the Imatra Cultural Center
1949	City Plan	Otaniemi	Finland	
1949–1950	Tampella housing	Tampere	Finland	
1949–1952 (Note: Some sources state dates of 1950–1951, or even 1950, and refer to the project as a village or town hall, while other sources give a probable start year of 1947.)	Municipal Buildings and Library	Säynätsalo	Finland	Competition piece
1949–1952 (Note: Some sources state 1952 only as the date and call it the Engineerss Club and restaurant, while others date it at 1948–1953 and refer to it as the Finnish Engineering Society Building)	Clubhouse	Helsinki	Finland	Engineering Society at STS

=== 1950-1959 ===
Year	Name	Location	Country	Notes
1950	Church and parish center	Lahti	Finland	Competition project (Note: Although Aalto's entry won, it was never built as he originally designed it, and in 1970 he was asked to submit a second design which was built, known as Ristinkirkko.)
1950	Transport stand	Säynätsalo	Finland	Never built
1950	Area plan	Viikki	Finland	An extension for the Helsinki University
1950	Kivelä Hospital	Helsinki	Finland	Competition project
1950	Sauna	Otaniemi, Espoo	Finland	For the indoor stadium
1950	Burial Grounds (Note: Some refer to this project as a funeral chapel.)	Malmi	Finland	Winner of Competition
1950	Project for a Theater and Cultural Center	Säynätsalo	Finland	Never built
1950	Groundwood mill expansion	Inkeroinen	Finland	Anjala
1950	Theater	Säynätsalo	Finland	Part of the "Project for a Theater and Cultural Center"
1950	Indoor Stadium	Otaniemi, Espoo	Finland	Used in the 1952 Olympics
1950–1951 (Note: Some sources give dates of 1937–1953, which break down as thus, 1937–1938: original plans, 1950: first expansion, and 1953 final expansion (completed))	Meesapoltino	Kotka	Finland	Addition to the Sunila Factory
1950–1951	Sauna	Inkeroinen	Finland	Commissioned by Tampella
1950–1951	Stadium and Tennis Courts	Otaniemi	Finland	Finnish Technical High School
1950–1951	Paper mill	Chandraghona (Note: This was originally in Pakistan.)	Bangladesh	Aalto only drew small portions of the overall plans.
1950–1952	Project for Shopping Center	Säynätsalo	Finland	Island
1950–1952	Pulp mill	Inkeroinen	Finland	Tampella
1950–1953	Factory expansion	Oulu	Finland	Typpi (Note: This expansion included a spraying tower, filtration and pumping station, rock crusher, warehouse, nitric acid plant, air purification plant, control room, synthesis plant, labs, gas escape tower, regenerator, desulphuration plant, power station, grinding and drying plant, gasification plant, rail loading platform, workshop, garage, ash incinerator, ammonia filling station, acid flasks, cisterns, recuperator, and a weighing station.)
1950–1955 (Note: Some sources give and end date of 1957.)	Regional plan	Kemijarvi, Jattila, Muurola, Rovaniemi, Kittilä, and Pelkosenniemi, Lapland	Finland	
1951	Library wing	Säynätsalo	Finland	Part of the Town Hall plan
1951	Pumping station	Inkeroinen	Finland	Anjala
1951	Entrance Pavilion (Erottaja)	Helsinki	Finland	
1951	Sauna	Helsinki	Finland	For the Enso-Gutzeit Country Club
1951	Sauna	Otaniemi, Espoo	Finland	For the university principal
1951	Storehouse (Note: Some sources call this the washing plant; however it is now used for different purposes.)	Inkeroinen	Finland	Anjala Paper Factory
1951	Warehouse	Inkeroinen	Finland	Tampella
1951	Regional theater	Kuopio	Finland	Competition project
1951	Workers' housing	Inkeroinen	Finland	
1951	Toukola Youth Club	Kotka	Finland	At present it is a kindergarten
1951	House	Oulu	Finland	
1951	Sauna	Oulu	Finland	For the Tyypi Oy engineers
1951	Kotka Paper Factory	Kotka	Finland	Enso-Gutzeit (Note: Some sources refer to this as an annex, and also that he was responsible for a small portion only.)
1951	Glostrup Hospital	Copenhagen	Denmark	Competition piece
1951	Cemetery and funeral chapel (Note: Some sources state just 1952 as the date, while others give a date of 1951–1952.)	Kongens Lyngby, Copenhagen	Denmark	Competition piece (2nd place)
1951	Auditorium	University of Jyväskylä, Jyväskylä	Finland	Also used as a concert hall
1951–1952	Sauna	Oulu	Finland	For the managers of the Typpi Oy Plant
1951–1952	Sauna and heating plant	Oulu	Finland	For the main housing of the Tyypi Oy complex
1951–1952	Kuopio Theater	Kuopio	Finland	Won the competition
1951–1953	Heating plant	Jyväskylä	Finland	University of Jyväskylä
1951–1953 (Note: Some sources state 1952 as the date.) (Note: Other sources give a date range of 1951–1972, with 1951–1953: original plans, 1957: 1st enlargement, and 1970–1972: final expansion.)	Cellulose Factory	Summa	Finland	Enso-Gutzeit plant
1951–1953?	Pumping station	Summa	Finland	Enso-Gutzeit
1951–1953	Sports field	University of Jyväskylä, Jyväskylä	Finland	
1951–1953	Gymnasium	University of Jyväskylä, Jyväskylä	Finland	For the Teacher Training School
1951–1954 (Note: Some sources give an approximate date of the 1950s for this expansion.)	Cellulose Factory	Sunila, Kotka	Finland	Second stage of construction
1951–1954 (Note: Some sources give dates of 1952–1953 and refer to this as predominantly the third heating plant.)	Three-story apartment house	Sunila	Finland	Third group
1951–1957 (Note: Some sources give a single year of 1951, or 1951–1952, and they also refer to it as Nitrogen Works site plan, or the Typpi Oy nitrogen factory, or fertilizer plant.)	Area plan	Oulu	Finland	Typpitehdas Factory inc. houses for workers and engineers
1951–1970	University of Jyväskylä	Jyväskylä	Finland	Overall plans for the entire grounds
1951–1991	Gymnasium	University of Jyväskylä, Jyväskylä	Finland	Main gymnasium. (Note: Original work was finished prior to 1960, with annexes designed 1960–1962 (not built), 1963–1964 (built), Enlargement planned 1965–1966, but built with major revisions 1970–1976, with a final addition designed by Aalto's office 1986–1988 (built 1991).)
1952	Library wing	Helsinki	Finland	Part of the National Pensions Institute Building
1952	Debarking plan	Inkeroinen	Finland	Tampella
1952	Country club	Kallvik	Finland	for Enso-Gutzeit
1952	Association of Finnish Engineers building	Helsinki	Finland	
1952 (Note: Some sources give a date of 1952 or 1953 for this project.)	Sports and congress hall: Vogelweidplatz	Vienna	Austria	Competition piece
1952–1953	Workshop of fine mechanics	Otaniemi, Espoo	Finland	Part of the Technical Research Center
1952–1953	Power plant expansion	Inkeroinen	Finland	Anjala Paper Factory
1952–1953	Laboratory of mechanical wood technology	Otaniemi, Espoo	Finland	Part of the Technical Research Center
1952–1954	Sawmill, storehouse, work-hut	Otaniemi, Espoo	Finland	Part of the Technical Research Center
1952–1954	House	Muuratsalo	Finland	Aalto House
1952–1954	Master plan	Kaskinen	Finland	Aalto was fired in 1954.
1952–1954	Employee Housing	Munkkiniemi, Helsinki	Finland	National Pension Institute
1952–1954	Sports hall	Otaniemi	Finland	
1952–1955	Library	University of Jyväskylä	Finland	Part of his master plan
1952–1956	Theater	Helsinki	Finland	Part of the House of Culture complex
1952–1957	Office Building and Auditorium	Helsinki	Finland	
1952–1957	Church	Imatra	Finland	Vuoksenniska
1952–1957 (Note: Some sources give 1958 as the end year of this project.)	Church	Seinäjoki	Finland	
1953	Paper technology lab	Otaniemi, Espoo	Finland	Part of the Technical Research Center
1953	Acoustics lab	Otaniemi, Espoo	Finland	Part of the Technical Research Center
1953	Lab complex (Note: Contained labs for construction technology, construction economy, and bridge technology, along with an auditorium and some smaller labs.)	Otaniemi, Espoo	Finland	Part of the Technical Research Center
1953	Pumping station	Otaniemi	Finland	Technical Research Center
1953	Imatra center design project	Imatra	Finland	
1953–1954	Sauna	Muuratsalo	Finland	For Aalto's home
1953–1954	Debarking plant and chipping plant	Inkeroinen	Finland	Anjala Paper Factory
1953–1955 (Note: Some sources give dates of 1952–1954 and refer to it as the Iron House, while others give dates of 1951–1957)	Office Building and Rautatalo Stores	Helsinki	Finland	Competition piece
1953–1956 (Note: Some sources state 1952–1956 as the dates and call the project the Pensions Bank, while other sources give the dates of 1950–1957 or 1953–1957.)	Second Project for the Old Age Pension Building	Helsinki	Finland	
1953–1957 (Note: Some sources give 1952 as the start of this project.)	Teacher's University	Jyväskylä	Finland	Competition piece
1953–1967	Helsinki University of Technology	Otaniemi, Espoo	Finland	Main building
1954	Studio R.S.	Como	Italy	
1954	Personal motoboat			Named Nemo Propheta in Patria
1954	Turbine building	Pamilo	Finland	Enso-Gutzeit
1954	Lab buildings	Tikkurila, Vantaa	Finland	Competition for the Agricultural Institute
1954	Grave	Noormarkku	Finland	Harry Gullichsen
1954	Aero housing	Helsinki	Finland	
1954–1956	Plant expansion	Oulu	Finland	Typpi (Note: This phase included compound fertilizer plant, and expansions of the rock crusher, warehouses, bagging plant, nitric acid portions, air purification plant, control room, synthesis plant, desulphuration plant, power station, filling station, gasification plant, and workshops. It added new phosphate warehouse, offices, service building, and a gatehouse.)
1954–1962	Mining laboratory (Note: This contained in addition to the mining lab, also a crushing plant, machinery workshops, offices, conference room, and an auditorium.)	Otaniemi, Espoo	Finland	Part of the Technical Research Center
1955 (Note: Some sources give 1954 as the date of this project.)	Urban design project	Summa	Finland	Commissioned by Enso-Gutzeit
1955 (Note: Some sources state that the year was 1956 and they refer to it as the University of Oulu)	Technical College	Oulu	Finland	Project
1955	Theater and Concert Hall	Oulu	Finland	Project
1955	Experimental house	Otaniemi, Espoo	Finland	Part of the Technical Research Center
1955	Concrete technology lab	Otaniemi, Espoo	Finland	Part of the Technical Research Center
1955 (Note: Some sources give a date of 1956 for the completion, others give a range of 1954–1956.)	Studio house	Munkkiniemi	Finland	Aalto's house (Note: It was enlarged 1962–1963.)
1955	National Bank of Iraq headquarters	Baghdad	Iraq	Competition project
1955–1956	Gyllenberg Gallery	Helsinki	Finland	Never completed
1955–1956	Warehouse and offices	Karhula	Finland	Ahlström
1955–1957	Houses	Berlin	Germany	In the Hansaviertel
1955–1957 (Note: Some sources give an end date of 1960.)	City hall	Gothenburg	Sweden	Competition project
1955–1958 (Note: Some sources give a date of 1958, where other give a range of 1952–1958)	House of Culture	Helsinki	Finland	In 1989 it was declared a National Historic Monument.
1955–1958	Parish facilities	Vuoksenniska, Imatra	Finland	
1955–1960	Lab for oil and peat technology	Otaniemi, Espoo	Finland	Part of the Technical Research Center
1955–1960	Library	Gothenburg	Sweden	Part of the Municipal offices
1955–1961	Lab for heat technology	Otaniemi, Espoo	Finland	Part of the Technical Research Center
1955–1964 (Note: Some sources give the dates of the overall master plan including final revisions as 1949–1960.)	Master plan	Otaniemi, Espoo	Finland	Helsinki University of Technology
1955–1966	Department of Architecture	Otaniemi, Espoo	Finland	Helsinki University of Technology
1956	Lincoln Center	New York City	United States	Worked with Wallace K. Harrison
1956	Pumping station	Otaniemi	Finland	Technical Research Center
1956	Wood shed	Otaniemi	Finland	Technical Research Center
1956	Drottningtorget, main railway station (Note: Some sources itemize this project as the rail station, bu station, air terminal, and traffic system.)	Gothenburg	Sweden	Competition project
1956 (Note: Some sources state that the work started in 1955.)	Finnish Pavilion	Venice	Italy	At the Venice Biennale
1956	Port facility	Gothenburg	Sweden	Project
1956	Central square	Lahti	Finland	Sketched out only with no follow-up
1956	Director's house	Typpi Oy, Oulu	Finland	
1956–1957	Kainula Adult Education Institute	Kajaani	Finland	
1956–1958	Operating room	Paimio	Finland	Paimio Sanatorium
1956–1958 (Note: Some sources state that 1956–1959 are the correct dates, or just 1959.)	Maison Louis Carré	Bazoches	France	
1956–1960	Heating plant	Rovaniemi	Finland	For the Korkalovaara housing
1957 (Note: Some sources give the date as 1956.)	University master plan	Oulu	Finland	
1957	Sauna and garage	Oulu	Finland	For the Tyypi Oy engineers
1957	Kampementsbacken housing development	Stockholm	Sweden	Competition project
1957	Sauna	Torsajärvi, Rautjärvi	Finland	For Ilmari Luostarinen.
1957	Town hall	Marl, Germany	Germany	Competition project
1957	Debarking plant	Karhula	Finland	Ahlström
1957	Town plan	Viitaniemi region, Jyväskylä	Finland	Collaborated with Jorma Järvi, with Aalto's portion not chosen.
1957–1958	Café, kiosk, traffic junction	Uimaharju, Joensuu	Finland	For the Pamilo power plant
1957–1959 (Note: Some sources give dates of 1956–1958, or even 1955–1958.)	Church of the Three Crosses	Vuoksenniska, Imatra	Finland	
1957–1961	Sundh center	Avesta	Sweden	
1958	Art museum	Baghdad	Iraq	Never completed
1958	Garage	Summa	Finland	Enso-Gutzeit
1958	Library wing	Baghdad	Iraq	Part of the Museum plan
1958	Shop buildings and heating plant	Summa	Finland	Enso-Gutzeit
1958	Church	Undisclosed location	Denmark	Competition piece
1958	Sizing plant	Karhula	Finland	Ahlström
1958 (Note: Some sources give a start year of 1957.)	Post and Telegraph Office	Baghdad	Iraq	Never completed
1958	Parish facilities	Unknown Location		Competition for ideas
1958 (Note: Some sources give dates of 1958–1962.)	High rise apartments	Neue Vahr, Bremen	Germany	
1958	Town hall	Kiruna	Sweden	Competition piece
1958 (Note: Some sources give dates of 1957–1961, or 1956–1960.)	Korkalovaara housing community	Rovaniemi	Finland	
1958	Open-air theater	Aalborg	Denmark	Part of the Kunstmuseum (the Art Museum) complex
1958–1959	Munkkiniemi Youth Center	Helsinki	Finland	Never built
1958–1960 (Note: Some sources give 1951 as the start date.)	Cross of the Plains Church, parish facilities, and vicarage	Seinäjoki	Finland	
1958–1963	Plant expansion	Oulu	Finland	Typpi (Note: This expansion repaired damage from an earlier fire to the rock crusher and pumping station, it also expanded the bagging plant, nitric acid plant, calcium nitrate plant, saltpeter plant, air purification plant, synthesis plant, and a workshop. It also added new buildings such as an oil refinery, a warehouse, a paint shop, gas purifier, warehouse tower, service building, oil tank, compressor hall, and a carbon monoxide converter.)
1958–1964 (Note: Some sources give dates of 1959–1988, as Aalto worked on the plans, sometimes with Bauasessor Horst Loy, until his death. It was then constructed predominantly utilizing Aalto's plans from 1981–1988.)	Opera house	Essen	Germany	Winner of competition
1958–1972 (Note: Some sources state that 1958 was the year of this project.)	Kunstmuseum	Aalborg	Denmark	
1959	Bjornholm housing development	Helsinki	Finland	
1959	Town plan	Karhusaari and Hanasaari, Espoo	Finland	
1959	Finnish War Memorial	Suomussalmi	Finland	
1959–1960	Lieksakoski power plant	Lieksakoski River, Lieksa	Finland	Enso-Gutzeit
1959–1960	Garage	Summa	Finland	Enso-Gutzeit
1959–1962 (Note: Some sources give dates of 1957–1990, with the breakdown as follows: 1957–1959: Alvar's original work, 1960: construction, 1974–1976: extension designed that was never built, and 1986–1990: Aalto's office designed a new extension that was built.)	Museum of Central Finland	Jyväskylä	Finland	
1959–1962	Enso-Gutzeit headquarters	Helsinki	Finland	
1959–1962 (Note: While other sources give a date of 1960–1963.)	Stephanuskirche	Wolfsburg	Germany	
1959–1964 (Note: Some sources give the end date of 1981.)	City center project	Helsinki	Finland	Only a portion of the plan was built.
1959–1974	City hall	Seinäjoki	Finland	Original plans: 1959–1965 with 1973–1974 being an annex.
1959–1981	Bus station and traffic arrangements	Helsinki	Finland	

=== 1960-1969 ===
Year	Name	Location	Country	Notes
1960	Grave	Turku	Finland	Erik Bryggman
1960	Cinema and stages	Leverkusen	Germany	Part of his cultural center plan
1960	Library	Leverkusen	Germany	Part of his cultural center plan
1960–1961	Shopping Center	Otaniemi	Finland	
1960–1961	Area plan	Lieksankoski power station, Lieksa	Finland	Plans have been lost. Commissioned by the Enso-Gutzeit Company.
1960–1962	Power plant	North Karelia	Finland	Enso-Gutzeit
1960–1963	Thermo-technical Laboratory	Otaniemi, Espoo	Finland	Helsinki University of Technology
1960–1963 (Note: Some sources give dates of 1958–1962.)	Alvar Aalto Cultural Centre	Wolfsburg	Germany	
1960–1964 (Note: Some sources give dates of this project as 1966–1976.)	Main building remodel	Otaniemi, Espoo	Finland	Helsinki University of Technology
1960–1965	Nordic Union Bank	Helsinki	Finland	Remodel
1961	Central square	Wolfsburg	Germany	Competition piece
1961	Administrative and cultural center	Rovaniemi	Finland	
1961–1962	Housing for nurses	Paimio	Finland	Paimio Sanatorium
1961–1962	Offices and apartments	Rovaniemi	Finland	
1961–1969	Museum rooms	Rovaniemi	Finland	Part of the Library
1961–1985	City hall	Rovaniemi	Finland	Part of the administrative and cultural center (Note: Preliminary plans: 1961 Revised plans: 1963–1966 Aalto's office again revised the plans and construction authorized: 1985)
1962 (Note: Some sources give the years 1961–1965, and other give the larger range of 1958–1968.)	Aalto Centre, Seinäjoki	Seinäjoki	Finland	
1962	Apartments	Tapiola	Finland	
1962	Fennia and Teollisuusvakuutus Buildings	Helsinki	Finland	Competition
1962	Bus station	Paimio	Finland	For the Sanatorium
1962	Traffic arrangements	Katajanokka, Helsinki	Finland	Plan to link Katajanokka Peninsula to the mainland
1962	Enskilda Bank building	Stockholm	Sweden	Competition project
1962 (Note: Some sources give a date of 1960 for this project.)	Cultural center	Leverkusen	Germany	Competition project
1962	Terrace housing	Jakobstad	Finland	
1962	Stockmann department store expansion	Helsinki	Finland	Project
1962–1963	Housing development	Rovaniemi	Finland	
1962–1963 (Note: Some sources give a date range of 1960–1975, including phase 1: 1960–1962, phase 2: 1962–1964, heat accumulator and oil cistern: 1964–1965, and an extension: 1975.)	Heating plant	Otaniemi, Espoo	Finland	Helsinki University of Technology
1962–1964	Scandinavia Bank Administration building	Helsinki	Finland	
1962–1966	Student hostel	Otaniemi	Finland	
1963	Urban center	Rovaniemi	Finland	
1963	Swimming hall extension	Jyväskylä	Finland	
1963 (Note: Some sources give dates of 1961–1965.)	Student union building	Jyväskylä	Finland	1974: plans for enlargement (not done) 1979–1981: Renovation
1963	Master plan for the town of Otaniemi	Otaniemi	Finland	
1963	Urban center	Montreal	Canada	Never completed
1963–1965 (Note: Some sources give a start date of 1960.)	Library	Seinäjoki	Finland	Part of the community center
1963–1965 (Note: Some sources give a start date of 1961.)	Student Association House	Uppsala	Sweden	Västmanland-Dala
1963–1965	Library wing	Uppsala	Sweden	Part of the Västmanland-Dala Student Association House
1963–1965 (Note: Some sources give the dates as 1962–1963.)	Heilig-Geist-Gemeinde Kindergarten	Wolfsburg	Germany	Project
1963–1966 (Note: Some sources give dates of 1951 followed by 1964–1966.)	Parish center	Seinäjoki	Finland	
1963–1967	Shell service station	Otaniemi	Finland	Two plans with the first designed 1963–1964 and the second in 1967
1963–1968	Workshop and office building	Otaniemi	Finland	Technical Research Center
1963–1973	Lab for mechanical wood technology	Otaniemi, Espoo	Finland	Part of the Technical Research Center (Note: Original building was from 1963–1966 with the Annex design occurring from 1969–1973. The annex was never built.)
1963–1978	Lab for fire-fighting technology	Otaniemi, Espoo	Finland	Part of the Technical Research Center (Note: Original building was from 1963–1965 with an annex being added from 1973–1978.)
Mid 1960s	Plant enlargement	Oulu	Finland	Typpi Oy (Note: This expansion included expansions of bagging plant, an office building, lab building. It also included a new test factory, new gatehouse, and a new refuse incinerator.)
1964	BP Administration building	Hamburg	Germany	Competition project
1964	Wood Technical Laboratories	Otaniemi, Espoo	Finland	Helsinki University of Technology
1964	Sabbagh Center	Beirut	Lebanon	Collaboration with Alfred Roth
1964	Pohjola Insurance building	Helsinki	Finland	competition piece
1964	Paimio Sanatorium extension	Paimio	Finland	
1964–1965	One-family house	Rovaniemi	Finland	
1964–1965 (Note: Some sources state that the project started in 1963.)	Kaufmann Conference Center	New York City	United States	Institute of International Education
1964–1966	Master plan	Kivenlahti and Soukka, Espoo	Finland	
1964–1966	Urban design project	Stensvik, Espoo	Finland	
1964–1967	Institute	Beatenberg, Berner Oberland	Switzerland	For the International Designers' and Architects' Foundation
1964–1967 (Note: Some sources give dates as 1964–1986, with 1984–1986 as renovations.)	Ekenäs Savings Bank	Ekenäs	Finland	Completed
1964–1969 (Note: Some sources give the end date of 1970.)	Library	Otaniemi	Finland	Helsinki University of Technology
1964–1982	Theatre, concert hall, and congress center	Jyväskylä	Finland	Part of the cultural center. (Note: Originally designed with the cultural center in 1964–1966. Aalto reworked the plans after the police headquarters went in. Then in 1972, the plans were reworked again, in response to the town hall. Aalto reworked them one more time before he died, which led to Elissa Aalto redoing them between 1977–1982, before the building was constructed.)
1965	Urban center	Castrop-Rauxel	Germany	Competition project
1965	Theater	Castrop-Rauxel	Germany	Part of the urban center plan
1965	Town hall	Castrop-Rauxel	Germany	Part of the urban center plan
1965	Family grave	Alajärvi	Finland	Aalto (Father, brother, sister-in-law, stepmother, and aunt)
1965–1968 (Note: Some sources give 1962 as the start year.)	Scandinavian House	Reykjavík	Iceland	
1965–1968 (Note: Some sources give a start date of 1961.)	Rovaniemi library	Rovaniemi	Finland	
1965–1968 (Note: Some sources give a date of 1963–1969.)	Parish center	Detmerode, Wolfsburg	Germany	
1965–1968	Schönbühl high-rise apartments	Lucerne	Switzerland	
1965–1972 (Note: Some sources give the start date of 1964.)	Administrative and cultural center	Jyväskylä	Finland	
1965–1974	Sauna	Kankari island of Päijänne, Korpilahti	Finland	part of Villa Oksala
1965–1982	Alajärvi administrative centre	Alajärvi	Finland	Work continued by his office after his death.
1966	Church	Seinäjoki	Finland	
1966	Experimental town plan	Gamelbacka, Porvoo	Finland	Project
1966 (Note: Some sources state that the end date was 1968.)	Suburb plan	Pavia	Italy	Project
1966	Concert hall	Siena	Italy	Project
1966	Theater	Wolfsburg	Germany	Competition project
1966	Prototype for the administration building and warehouses	Turin	Italy	Project for the Ferrero SpA
1966–1967	Health center	Alajärvi	Finland	
1966–1967	William Lehtinen Museum	Helsinki	Finland	Never completed
1966–1969	Kirjatalo, housing the main outlet of the Academic Bookstore	Helsinki	Finland	
1966–1969	Town hall	Alajärvi	Finland	
1966–1970	Parish center	Alajärvi	Finland	
1966–1971	Cultural Center (theater)	Kokkola	Finland	Never completed
1966–1971	Library	Kokkola	Finland	Part of the cultural center
1966–1976 (Note: Some sources give an end date of 1980.)	Church of Santa Maria Assunta – Riola parish center	Riola di Vergato (near Bologna)	Italy	
1967	House of Finnish Architecture	Helsinki	Finland	Part of the Helsinki Center project
1967 (Note: Some sources give an end date of 1968.)	Protestant parish center	Altstetten, Zürich	Switzerland	Competition project
1967 (Note: Some sources state that the project was dated from 1968–1969, while other sources give a broad date range of 1961–1987. This range reflects that planning by Alvar occurred from 1961–1969, then after his death, his plan was realized with construction from 1984–1987.)	Theatre	Seinäjoki	Finland	Added to existing Community Center
1967–1968	Parking garage	Otaniemi	Finland	Helsinki University of Technology
1967–1969 (Note: Some sources give dates of 1964–1968.)	State office buildings	Seinäjoki	Finland	Part of the community center (Note: Included government offices, such as district court, police offices, tax office, and staff apartments.)
1967–1970 (Note: Some sources state that the project began in 1965, while others give dates of 1964–1968.)	Library	Mt. Angel, Oregon	United States	Mount Angel Abbey
1967–1970	Police headquarters	Jyväskylä	Finland	
1967–1971 (Note: Some sources give a start date of 1962.)	Institute of Physical Education	University of Jyväskylä, Jyväskylä	Finland	
1967–1973 (Note: Some sources give a start date of 1965.)	City Electric Company administration building	Helsinki	Finland	Part of Aalto's Centre plan for Helsinki
1968	Library	University of Jyväskylä, Jyväskylä	Finland	Plan was rejected
1968–1971 (Note: Some sources give an end date of 1972.)	Water tower	Otaniemi	Finland	Helsinki University of Technology
1969	Kranichstein shopping precinct, cultural center, and residential center	Darmstadt	Germany	Sketches only
1969	Sauna	Järvenpää	Finland	Villa Kokkonen
1969–1970	Villa	Ekenäs	Finland	Göran Schildt
1969–1975	Main building extension	Otaniemi	Finland	Helsinki Technical University

=== 1970-1976 ===
Year	Name	Location	Country	Notes
1970	Sauna	Ekenäs	Finland	Villa Skeppet
1970 (Note: Some sources give dates of 1969–1975.)	Ristinkirkko church	Lahti	Finland	
1970 (Note: Some sources give dates of 1969-mid 1970s.)	Museum of Modern Art	Shiraz	Iran	Project
1970	Police headquarters	Alajärvi	Finland	
1970–1975 (Note: Some sources give dates of 1969–1976 and refer to the building as the Lappia multipurpose building.)	Lappia Hall	Rovaniemi	Finland	Building contains among other things music school facilities and theatre with three auditoria.
1971 (Note: Some sources state that the start of the project occurred in 1967, while others give dates of 1962–1971.)	Finlandia Hall	Helsinki	Finland	Part of the master plan for central redevelopment
1971–1973	Master plan for central redevelopment	Helsinki	Finland	
1971–1973	Sports field service building	Otaniemi	Finland	Technical Research Center
1972	Master plan for central redevelopment	Helsinki	Finland	Second stage
1973 (Note: Some sources date the museum at 1971, while others date it from 1971–1974.)	Alvar Aalto Museum	Jyväskylä	Finland	Original name was Taidemuseo
1973	Halonen Art Museum	Lapinlahti	Finland	Never built
1973	Open-air theater	Lapinlahti	Finland	Part of the Halonen Art Museum
1973–1974	Enso-Gutzeit headquarters	Helsinki	Finland	Two alternative proposals for the extension of the building. Never built.
1973–1975	Swimming pool	Jyväskylä	Finland	
1974 (Note: Some sources give a date of 1973.)	Midwest Institute of Scandinavian Culture including Open-air auditorium and Scandinavian Library	Eau Claire, Wisconsin	United States	Never built.
1974 (Note: Some sources state that this project was from 1973–1975, while others give dates of 1971–1975.)	Finlandia Hall	Helsinki	Finland	Wing of Congress
1974–1982	Health spa	Reykjavík	Iceland	Aalto's office continued to work on it after his death. Never built.
1975 (Note: Some sources give dates of 1964–1972.)	Town hall	Jyväskylä	Finland	Part of the administrative and cultural center
1975–1976	Master plan of the University of Iceland	Reykjavík	Iceland	After his death his office continued to work on it into the 1980s.
1975–1976	Urban Center including Mosque Auditorium, Museum, Planetarium, and Aquarium	Jeddah	Saudi Arabia	Never completed

== See also ==
- List of Alvar Aalto's writings
