= Lehtosaari =

Lehtosaari literally wikt:lehto + wikt:saari, "woody island", may refer to:

== Islands ==
- Island in Rönö district, Finland
- Lehtosaari Island in lakes:
  - Iso Lamujärvi
  - Kaavinjärvi
  - Lake Kivijärvi (Central Finland)
  - Lake Mallos
  - Pesiöjärvi
  - Ranuanjärvi
  - Tuomiojärvi

== Surname ==
- Jukka Lehtosaari, Finnish politician
- Markku Lehtosaari, Finnish politician
- Pekka Lehtosaari, Finnish film director and screenwriter

== See also ==
- Lehtisaari (disambiguation)
