= List of Alvar Aalto's writings =

Alvar Aalto (1898–1976) was a Finnish architect, and one of the key figures of modernist architecture during the twentieth century. In addition his architectural works, Aalto wrote several writings and speeches throughout his career.

== Writings ==
Alvar Aalto's Writings
Date	Title	Translation	Publication	Location
1921		Benvenuto's Christmas Punch	Kerberos	Helsinki
1921	Nyyperin Aku	Aku Neberg	Kerberos	Helsinki
1921		A Fireside Story	Kerberos	Helsinki
1921		Painters and Masons	Jousimies	
December 1921		Our Old and New Churches	Iltalehti	Helsinki
1922		Motifs from Past Ages	Arkkitehti	
1924		The Hilltop Town (Note: Chapter for a never published book)		
December 1924		Urban Culture	Sisä-Suomi	Jyväskylä
1925		Finnish Church Art	Käsiteollisuus	
January 1925	Eräs kaupunkimme kaunistustoimenpide ja sen mahdollisuudet	A beautifying measure undertaken in our town, and its chances of success	Keskisuomalainen	Jyväskylä
March 1925		Abbé Coignard's Sermon (Note: Speech given at the Student Union.)		Jyväskylä
June 1925		Architecture in the Landscape of Central Finland.	Sisä-Suomi	Jyväskylä
1926		From Doorstep to Living Room	Aitta	
January 1928		The Latest Trends in Architecture (Note: An interview from a Turku newspaper.)	Uusi Aura	Turku
November 1927		An Independence Monument in Helsinki-The Olympic Stadium	Uusi Suomi	Turku
October 1928		Modern Architecture and Interior Design of the Home	Uusi Aura	Turku
October 1928		The Rational Cinema	Kritisk Revy	Denmark
1929		Armas Lindgren and We (Obituary)	Arkkitehti	
1930		The Stockholm Exhibition 1930	Arkkitehti	
1930		The Housing Problem	Domus	Italy
May 1930		The Stockholm Exhibition 1930 (Note: A summary of an interview given.)	Åbo Underrättelser	Turku
1931	Ein Brief von Finnland	A Letter from Finland	Bauwelt	Germany
1932	Hyvä asunto	A Good Home	Soihtu	
1932	Bostadsfrågans geografi	Geography of the Housing Question	Arkitektur och samhälle	
1934		Instead of an Interview	Teknikkan ylioppilas	
May 1935	Rationalismen och människan (Note: A lecture form the annual meeting of the Swedish Society of Industrial Design)	Rationalism and Man		Sweden
1938		Influence of Structure and Material on Contemporary Architecture (Note: Lecture given at the Nordic Building Congress.)		Oslo
1939	Maailmannäyttelyt	New York World's Fair/Golden Gate Exposition	Arkkitehti	
1939		The Human Side as a Political Option for the Western World (Note: A piece for the never published magazine The Human Side, which included himself, Gregor Paulsson, members of the Bauhaus living in exile, Morton Schand, Francis Hackett, and with assistance from the Museum of Modern Art.)	The Human Side	
1939		Mairea	Arkkitehti	
May 1939		The Home of a Rich Collector (Note: Lecture given at Yale.)		Yale
October 1939		Finland and Scandinavia (Note: This lecture was given preceding the Soviet invasion of Finland.)		Gothenburg, Stockholm
1940	An Experimental Town			
1940		Obituary for Erik Gunnar Asplund	Arkkitehti	
July 1940	Post-War Reconstruction		Magazine of Art	
November 1940	The Humanizing of Architecture		Technology Review	
December 1940			Architectural Forum	
1941	La Ricostruzione del-l'Europa	The Reconstruction of Europe	Lecture	
March 1941		Research for Reconstruction (Note: Originally published in an unabridged format in a booklet entitled Post-War Reconstruction, Rehousing Research in Finland, in New York City in 1940.)	Journal for the Royal Institute of British Architects	England
April 1941		The Reconstruction of Europe is the Key Problem for the Architecture of our Time	Arkkitehti	
November 1941		Karelian Architecture	Uusi Suomi	
1942		Architecture and Standards	Booklet published by Association of Finnish Architects	
November 1942		Lecture (Note: Speech given to the Swedish Association of Architects concerning the Finnish Standardization Office.)		Stockholm
1943		The Oulu River Rapids Center	Arkkitehti	
March 1943			Casabella	
1945		The Intellectual Background of American Architecture	Arkkitehti	
November/December 1945	Rovaniemi Restored		Arkkitehti	
1946		Building Height as a Social Issue	Arkkitehti	
February 1946	Fine Della "Machine à Habiter"	End of the "Living Machine"	Metron	
1947	Kulttuuri ja tekniikka	Culture and Technology	Suomi/Finland	Finland
February 1947		Constructive Art. Svenska Ab Artek Exhibits Furniture and Paintings (Note: Preface to a furniture catalogue produced by Artek.)		
October–December 1947	Architettura e arte concreta	Architecture and concrete art	Domus, Arkkitehti	
1949		Finland as a Model for World Development	Suomallainen Suomi	
1950's		My Frank Lloyd Wright (Note: A text meant to be published commemorating an exhibit to be shown in New York. Unfortunately Aalto sent it in too late; however it was preserved.)		
1950		Obituary for Eliel Saarinen (Note: Never published eulogy for Eliel Saarinen.)		
June 1950		Finland Wonderland	Proceedings of the Architectural Association School of Architecture	London
1953		The Decline of Public Architecture	Arkkitehti	
1953		Experimental House at Muuratsalo	Arkkitehti	
September 1953	Decadence of Public Buildings		Arkkitehti	
1954		A Few Lines from Alvar Aalto (Note: A Preface to a furniture catalog for Nordiska Kompaniet.)		
1954		The Constructive Form Exhibition in Stockholm (Note: A piece written for newspaper critics.)		
1954		Speech		São Paulo
Feb/March 1954		Journey to Italy (Note: Reconstructed from Italian text.)	Casabella Continuità	Italy
October 1955	Taide ja Tekniikka (Note: Speech given at Academy of Finland.)	Art and Technology		
November 1955	Zwischen Humanismus und Materialismus	Between Humanism and Materialism	Der Bau	
1956	Problems of Architecture as I Understand Them in My Buildings		Lecture	Italy
1956		Wood as a Building Material	Arkkitehti	
August 1956		Form as a Symbol of Articstic Creativity (Note: Lecture given at the University of Oulu.)		Oulu
1957	Obituary for Henry van de Velde	Arkkitehti		
1957		The Enemies of Good Architecture	Royal Institute of British Architects Journal	London
1957		The Architect's Dream of Paradise (Note: Speech given at the jubilee meeting of the Southern Swedish Master Builders' Society)		Malmö
November 1957	Schöner Wohnen (Note: A speech for the Federation of German Carpet and Upholstery Industries.)	More Beautiful Housing		Munich
1958		In Lieu of an Article	Arkkitehti	
1958		What is Culture? (Note: Given as the keynote speech at the centenary celebration of his former school.)		Jyväskylä Lyceum
1959		Obituary for Frank Lloyd Wright	Architectural Forum	
1960's		The Special Character of Nordic Design (Note: An unpublished piece possibly meant for United States distribution.)		
January 1962		The International Status of Finnish Art (Note: A lecture given at the Finnish Cultural Foundation's symposium on cultural policy.)		
1963		Aims as SAFA Chairman (Note: Outgoing speech as SAFA chairman.)		
October 1963		Speech (Note: Transcript of speech given at the Mexican Institute of Technology, where Aalto received an honorary degree.)		Mexico City
1965		Obituary for Le Corbusier	Arkkitehti	
April 1966		Town Planning and Public Buildings (Note: Speech given at the Finnish Association of Architects)		
1967		National-International	Arkkitehti	
1968		Obituary for Sigfried Giedion	Arkkitehti	
1970	Die Beziehungen zwischen Architektur, Malerei, und Skulptur (Note: Karl Fleig's account of a discussion with Aalto, published in his book Alvar Aalto, Synopsis.)	Alvar Aalto, Synopsis		
1970's	The White Table (Note: Introduction to never completed book.)			
July 1972		Interview for Finnish Television (Note: An interview by Göran Schildt for the Finnish Broadcasting Corporation.)		
December 1972		Speech (Note: A speech delivered at the Helsinki University of Technology Centennial celebration.)		Helsinki

== See also ==
- List of Alvar Aalto's works
