= Teittinen =

Teittinen is a Finnish surname.

== Geographical distribution ==
As of 2014, 90.6% of all known bearers of the surname Teittinen were residents of Finland (frequency 1:5,962), 4.5% of the United States (1:7,853,289), 2.6% of Sweden (1:378,722) and 1.2% of Estonia (1:110,139).

In Finland, the frequency of the surname was higher than national average (1:5,962) in the following regions:

1. Southern Savonia (1:502)
2. Kymenlaakso (1:1,899)
3. Uusimaa (1:5,461)

== People ==
- Sulo Teittinen (1882–1964), Finnish engineer, civil servant, farmer and politician
