= Finnish Women's Volleyball Cup =

Volleyball in Finland

Suomen Cup
- Sport: Volleyball
- Founded: 1968
- Administrator: SLRY
- Country: Finland
- Continent: Europe
- Most recent champion: Pölkky Kuusamo (1st title)
- Most titles: LP Viesti (7 titles)
- Website: https://www.lentopallo.fi/

The Finnish Women's Volleyball Cup is a women's Volleyball competition held since the year 1968 in Finland, teams from the first tier league and second tier league compete every year in a knock out home and away system.

== Winners list ==
Years	Winners	Score	Runners-up
1968	Lahden Kimmo	3 - 0 (15-8, 15-8, 15-12)	Johanneksen Pojat
1969-74	Competition Not Disputed		
1975	Saarijärven Pullistus	Round-robin	Lahden Kimmo
1976	Euran Raiku	3 - 0 (15-8, 15-8, 15-3)	Mäntyharjun Virkistys
1977	Luolajan Kajastus	3 - 1 (15-13, 6-15, 15-7, 15-7)	Kuopion Sale
1978	Jyväskylän Pesä-Veikot	3 - 0 (15-10, 15-7, 15-10)	Kalevan Lentopallo
1979	Euran Raiku	3 - 1 (15-11, 15-8, 11-15, 15-8)	Jyväskylän Pesä-Veikot
1980	Euran Raiku	3 - 2 (15-9, 15-9, 15-17, 9-15, 15-10)	Karhulan Veikot
1981	Karhulan Veikot	3 - 1 (15-3, 15-8, 12-15, 16-14)	Kuopion Kisa-Veikot
1982	Kaavin Kaiku	3 - 0 (15-4, 15-9, 15-11)	Kalevan Lentopallo
1983	Vaasan Vasama	Round-robin	Kaavin Kaiku
1984	Vaasan Vasama	Round-robin	Luolajan Kajastus
1985	Jyväskylän Pesä-Veikot	Round-robin	Kaavin Kaiku
1986-89	Competition Not Disputed		
1990	Vaasan Vasama	3 - 0 (16-14, 15-4, 15-11)	Korian Ponsi
1991	Vaasan Vasama	3 - 0 (15-3, 15-8, 15-13)	Hämeenlinnan Tarmo
1992	Vaasan Vasama	3 - 1 (15-7, 8-15, 15-14, 15-11)	Valkealan Kajo
1993	Vaasan Vasama	3 - 1 (16-14, 6-15, 15-5, 15-12)	Hesa
1994	Palokan Pyry	3 - 0 (15-3, 15-6, 16-14)	Hämeenlinnan Tarmo-Volley
1995	Palokan Pyry	3 - 0 (15-11, 15-10, 15-7)	Vaasan Vasama
1996	Oriveden Ponnistus	3 - 2 (15-9, 17-16, 4-15, 5-15, 15-13)	Euran Raiku
1997	Oriveden Ponnistus	3 - 0 (15-13, 15-4, 15-12)	Valkealan Kajo
1998	Euran Raiku	2 - 1 (23-25, 25-21, 7-3); 2 - 1 (25-21, 18-25, 7-2)	Tarmo-Volley
1999	Tarmo-Volley	2 - 1 (19-21, 21-14, 7-3); 2 - 1 (20-22, 15-21, 15-11)	Joensuun Prihat
2000	Tarmo-Volley	3 - 0 (25-12, 29-27, 25-14)	LiigaEura
2001	Joensuun Prihat	3 - 0 (25-22, 25-17, 25-15)	Salon Viesti
2002	Salon Viesti	3 - 1 (19-25, 25-17, 25-21, 25-20)	Someron Pallo
2003	Pieksämäki Volley	3 - 0 (25-19, 26-24, 25-22)	Tarmo-Volley
2004	Salon Viesti	3 - 2 (22-25, 25-19, 25-23, 23-25, 15-10)	Pieksämäki Volley
2005	Vanajan RC	3 - 2 (23-25, 15-25, 25-10, 25-21, 17-15)	Salon Viesti
2006	Vanajan RC	3 - 1 (26-24, 19-25, 25-15, 29-27)	Salon Viesti
2007	Salon Viesti	3 - 0 (25-13, 25-18, 25-14)	LiigaEura
2008	LP Viesti Salo	3 - 0 (25-18, 25-22, 25-18)	Pieksämäki Volley
2009	LP Viesti Salo	3 - 1 (27-29, 25-14, 25-22, 25-16)	HPK Hämeenlinna
2010	LP Viesti Salo	3 - 0 (25-19, 25-17, 25-20)	Oriveden Ponnistus
2011	LP Viesti Salo	3 - 2 (17-25, 25-14, 25-19, 22-25, 15-3)	Oriveden Ponnistus
2012	LP Kangasala	3 - 2 (22-25, 14-25, 25-19, 25-21, 15-10)	LP Viesti Salo
2013	LP Kangasala	3 - 0 (25-23, 25-16, 25-19)	LP Viesti Salo
2014	LP Viesti Salo	3 - 1 (21-25, 25-19, 25-17, 25-14)	HPK Hämeenlinna
2015	LP Viesti Salo	3 - 0 (25-21, 25-23, 27-25)	LP Kangasala
2016	LP Viesti Salo	3 - 2 (15-25, 25-22, 25-16, 23-25, 15-11)	HPK Hämeenlinna
2017	HPK Hämeenlinna	3 - 0 (25-15, 25-18, 25-17)	Pölkky Kuusamo
2018	Oriveden Ponnistus	3 - 1 (27-25, 22-25, 25-14, 25-17)	Hämeenlinnan Lentopallokerho
2019	LiigaPloki	3 - 2 (17-25, 28-30, 26-24, 25-22, 17-15)	LP Viesti Salo

== Honours by club ==
Rk	Club	Titles	City	Years won
1	LP Viesti Salo	7	Salo	(2008–2011), (2014–2016)
2	Vaasan Vasama	6	Vaasa	(1983–1984), (1990–1993)
3	Euran Raiku	4	Eura	1976, 1979, 1980, 1998
=	Hämeenlinnan Tarmo-Volley	4	Hämeenlinna	(1999–2000), (2005–2006)
5	Oriveden Ponnistus	3	Orivesi	(1996–1997), 2018
=	Salon Viesti	3	Salo	2002, 2004, 2007
7	Jyväskylän Pesä-Veikot	2	Jyväskylä	1978, 1986
=	Palokan Pyry	2	Jyväskylä	(1994–1995)
=	LP Kangasala	2	Kangasala	(2012–2013)
10	Kimmo Lahti	1	Lahti	1968
=	Saarijärven Pullistus	1	Saarijärvi	1975
=	Luolajan Kajastus	1	Hämeenlinna	1977
=	Karhulan Veikot	1	Karhula	1981
=	Kaavin Kaiku	1	Kaavi	1982
=	Joensuun Prihat	1	Joensuu	2001
=	Pieksämäki Volley	1	Pieksämäki	2003
=	HPK Hämeenlinna	1	Hämeenlinna	2017
=	LiigaPloki	1	Pihtipudas	2019
