= Niskajärvi =

- Location within Finland
- Location: Kouvola
- Coordinates: 61.1167°N 26.65°E
- Type: Lake
- Primary inflows: Vesalanjoki river
- Primary outflows: Siikakoski to the lake Vuohijärvi
- Catchment area: Kymijoki
- Basin countries: Finland
- Surface area: 12.019 km^{2} (4.641 sq mi)
- Average depth: 6.67 m (21.9 ft)
- Max. depth: 31.56 m (103.5 ft)
- Water volume: 0.0801 km^{3} (64,900 acre⋅ft)
- Shore length^{1}: 63.39 km (39.39 mi)
- Surface elevation: 73.1 m (240 ft)
- Frozen: December–April
- Islands: Lehtisaari, Hyönänsaari, Mutiansaari
- ^{1} Shore length is not a well-defined measure.

Niskajärvi is a lake located in the Kouvola municipality of the Kymenlaakso region of southern Finland. It is part of the Kymijoki catchment area.

There are several other lakes in Finland with the name Niskajärvi, of which this is the largest.

== See also ==
- List of lakes in Finland
