= Kuisma =

Kuisma is both a surname and a given name. Notable people with the name include:

- Antti Kuisma (born 1979), Finnish Nordic combined skier
- Jorma Kuisma (born c. 1947), Canadian football player
- Mika Kuisma (c. 1967 - 1995), Finnish orienteer
- Mira Kuisma (born 1987), Finnish ice hockey player
- Kuisma Taipale (born 1970), Finnish cross-country skier
