= Kaarin Taipale =

Finnish architect

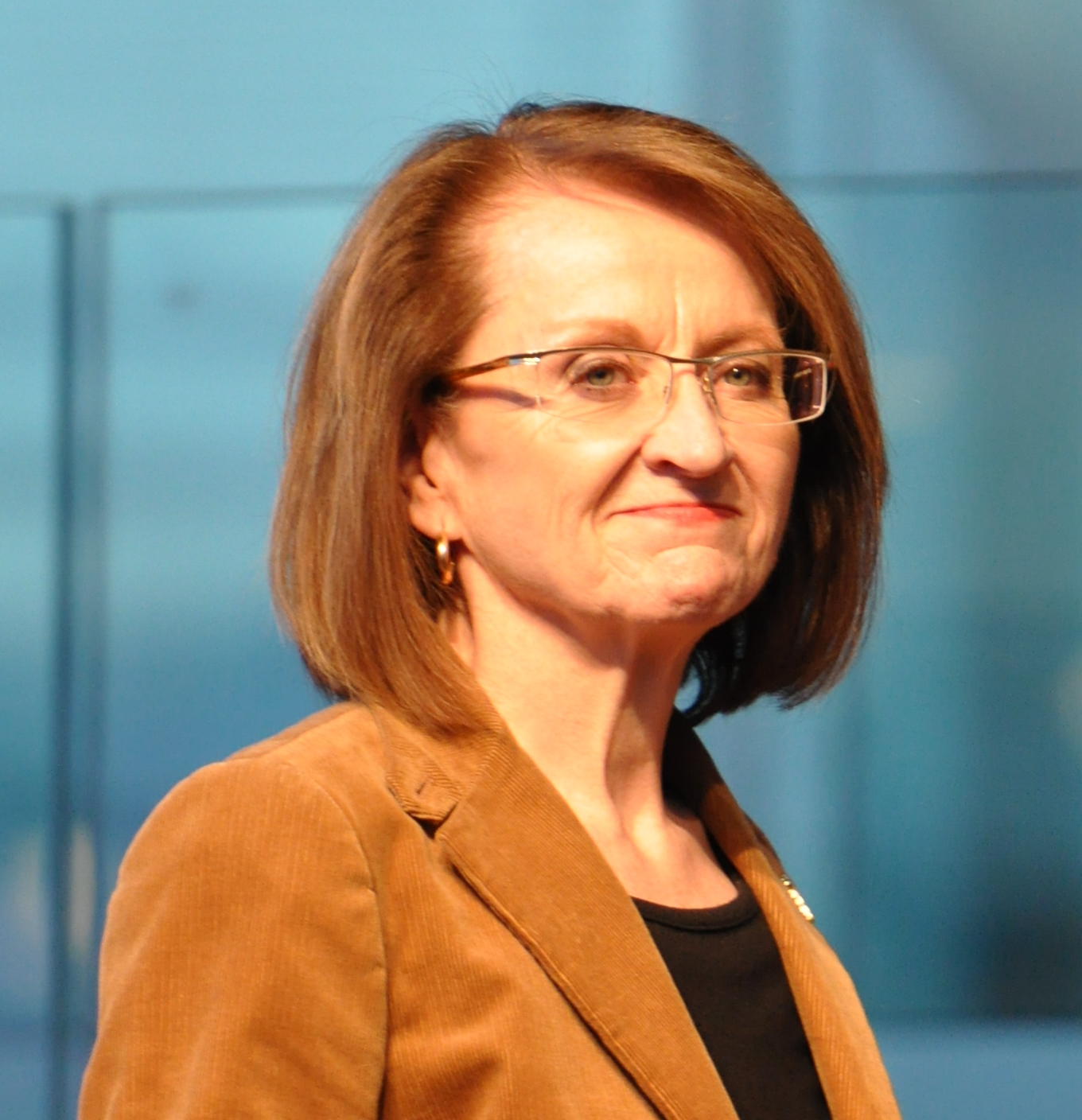
Kaarin Taipale

Kaarin Taipale (born 22 July 1948 in Helsinki) is a Finnish architect and an expert on sustainable development and urban research. Taipale was a Social Democratic Party of Finland (SDP) candidate for the constituency of Helsinki in the 2015 parliamentary elections.

== Early life and education ==
Taipale completed music studies at the Sibelius Academy in 1964–1967. In 1972, she graduated as an architect from Zurich Technical University. She subsequently attended Columbia University in New York. In 2009, Taipale completed her studies in the field of urban planning at the Helsinki University of Technology.

== Career ==
Between 1988 and 1991, Taipale was Editor-in-Chief of Arkkitehti, the Finnish Architectural Review. She has worked as a columnist, for example, in Uusi Suomi (1989-1990) and in Helsingin Sanomat (1990-1993) and in Yle Radio 1. From 1993 to 2003, Taipale worked as Head of the Building Inspectorate of the City of Helsinki. Since 2000, she has been chairman of the ICLEI Joint Municipal Organization and has since been a researcher at the Helsinki School of Economics. She has also been chair of the UN-led Marrakech Task Force on Sustainable Buildings and Construction on behalf of the Ministry of the Environment.

Taipale was a Social Democratic Party of Finland (SDP) candidate for the constituency of Helsinki in the 2015 parliamentary elections. As a City Councilor of the SDP, she has been involved with discussing the proposals to close Malmi Airport to make way for residential development.
