= Jorma Kuisma =

Canadian gridiron football player (1946–2022)

Profile
- Position: Linebacker

Personal information
- Born: December 12, 1946; Sippola, Finland
- Died: September 16, 2022 (aged 75); Victoria, British Columbia, Canada
- Listed height: 6 ft 1 in (1.85 m)
- Listed weight: 225 lb (102 kg)

Career information
- College: Valley State (CA)

Career history
- 1970–1971: Montreal Alouettes

Awards and highlights
- Grey Cup champion (1970)

Jorma Kuisma (December 12, 1946 – September 16, 2022) was a Finnish professional Canadian football player who played for the Montreal Alouettes. He won the Grey Cup with them in 1970. He previously played college football at California State University, Northridge (then known as San Fernando Valley State College).

Kuisma was born to Aini and Armas Kuisma in Sippola, Finland, and he moved to Canada when he was young. He died on September 16, 2022 at the age of 75 after a long illness.
