= Lehtisaari =

Lehtosaari literally wikt:lehti + wikt:saari, "leafy island", may refer to:

- Lehtisaari, Helsinki, island and neighbourhood in Helsinki, Finland
- Lehtisaari, Säynätsalo, island, district and neighborhood in Jyväskylä, Finland
- Island:
  - In Kuusvesi lake
  - In Niskajärvi
  - In Tuomiojärvi lake

== See also ==
- Lehtosaari (disambiguation)
