= Sunila, Kotka =

Sunila Bärnäs
- Kotka subdivision
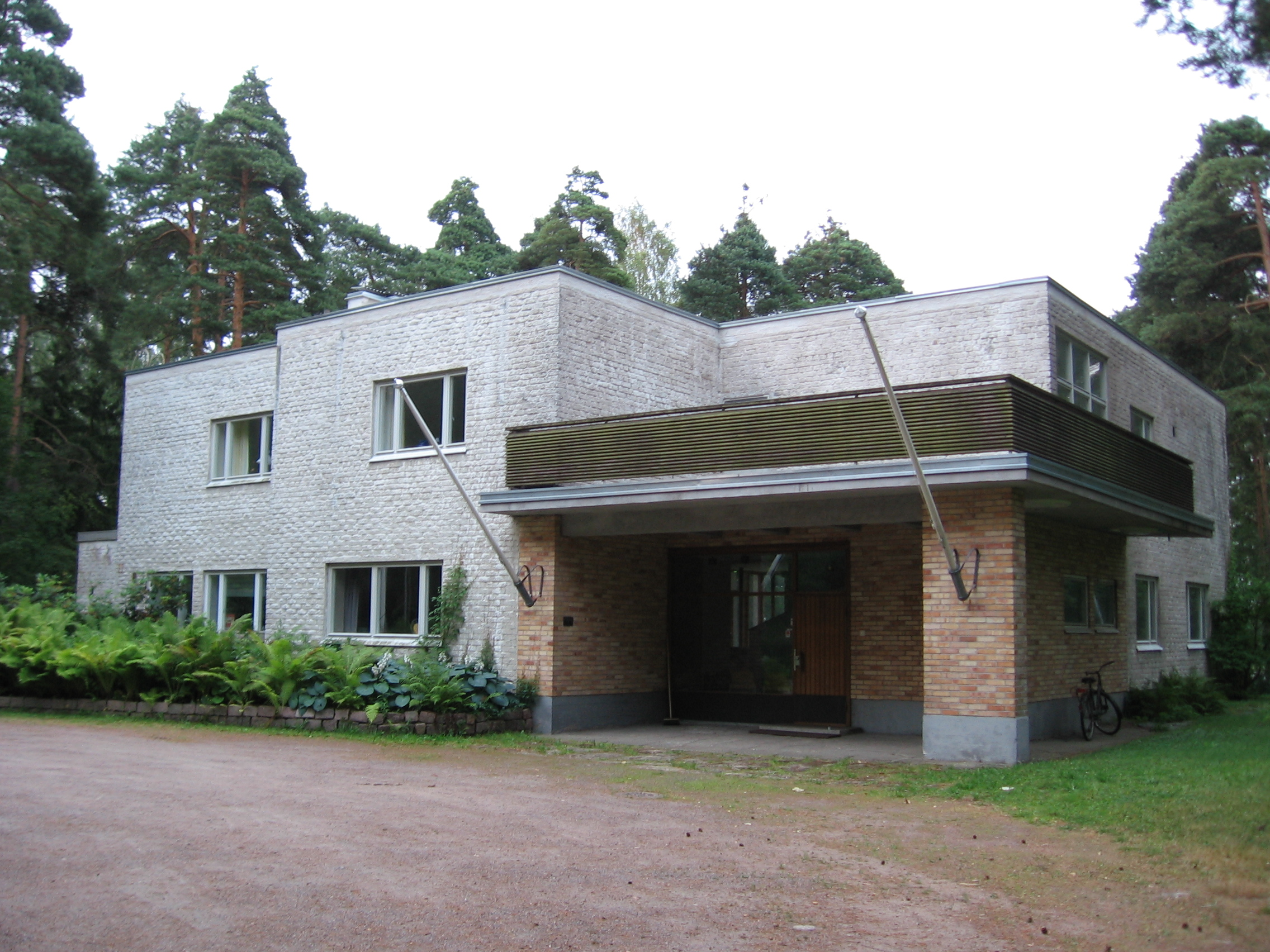
- Factory manager's residence ('Kantola')

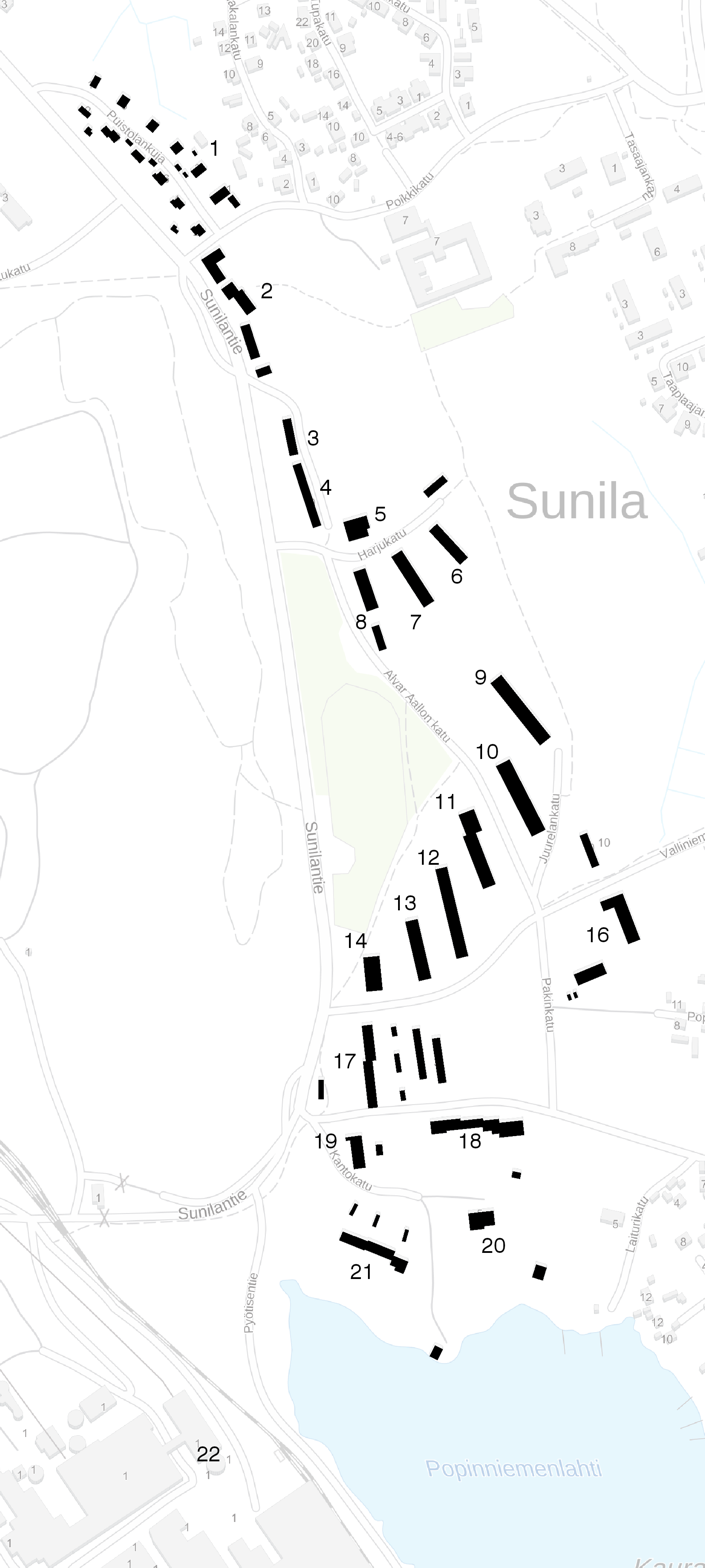
- Map of Sunila, with Aalto-designed buildings indicated
- Interactive map of Sunila
- Coordinates: 60.4989°N 26.9559°E
- Country: Finland
- Region: Kymenlaakso
- Sub-region: Kotka-Hamina
- Municipality: Kotka
- Area: 0.3 km^{2} (0.12 sq mi)
- Population (2012): c. 1,100
- Postal code: 48900
- Subdivision number: 37

UNESCO World Heritage Site
- Official name: Sunila Housing Area, Kotka
- Part of: Aalto Works
- Criteria: Cultural: ii
- Reference: 1752
- Inscription: 2026 (48th Session)

Sunila (Swedish: Bärnäs) is a district and an industrial complex in the town of Kotka, on the shore of the Gulf of Finland in eastern Finland.

== Sunila pulp mill ==
In 1938, a pulp mill was opened there on the site of an earlier sawmill, operated by the Ahlström paper and pulp manufacturing group through its subsidiary Sunila Oy. Since 2009 part of the Stora Enso group, the Sunila plant remains in operation as the oldest surviving sulfate pulp mill in Finland.

The design for the factory complex was commissioned from the Finnish architect couple Alvar and Aino Aalto, on the suggestion of the Ahlström chief executive at the time, the industrialist Harry Gullichsen. It has been described as the most beautiful factory building in the world, as well as "one of the most notable 20th century industrial buildings in Europe" by ERIH Association.

== Residential area ==
To accommodate the factory staff, an adjacent residential estate was built, also designed mainly by Aalto. The estate comprises over 20 buildings, mostly low-rise apartment blocks, as well as terraced houses and a detached house serving as the factory manager's residence, 'Kantola', which was the first of the residential buildings to be completed. The buildings were constructed over two decades from mid-1930s to mid-1950s.

The residential buildings are located in a natural wooded area, intended to promote the health and well-being of the residents, and were designed to fit in with the nature and the contours of the land. They were noted at the time for their modern, socially-conscious, progressive design ideas, and high quality of architecture and construction.

The Sunila area is the largest Aalto-designed entity ever built.

Some of the original buildings have already been demolished, such as the cooperative retail store built in 1937 and pulled down in 2006.

In 2024, Stora Enso sold the Sunila site to a property development company, Aalto Development Oy, remaining in the factory as a tenant.

== Recognition ==
The Sunila factory milieu has been designated and protected by the Finnish Heritage Agency as a nationally important built cultural environment (Valtakunnallisesti merkittävä rakennettu kulttuuriympäristö).

In 1993, the site was included in the DOCOMOMO modern architecture register.

In 2025, Finland proposed Sunila to be added to the UNESCO World Heritage Sites collection as part of 13 Aalto-designed sites. UNESCO designated the Aalto Works as a World Heritage Site in July 2026.
