= Sippola =

- Former municipality
- Sippolan kunta Sippola kommun
- Coat of arms

- Location of Sippola in the Kymi Province
- Coordinates: 60.7392388°N 27.0002981°E
- Country: Finland
- Province: Kymi Province
- Region: Kymenlaakso
- Established: 1861
- Merged into Anjalankoski: 1975
- Seat: Keltakangas

Area
  - Land: 568.1 km^{2} (219.3 sq mi)

Population (1974-12-31)
  - Total: 15,278

Sippola is a former municipality of Finland in the former Kymi Province, now in Kymenlaakso. In 1975, it united with neighboring Anjala to form Anjalankoski, which was later merged into Kouvola in 2009.

== Geography ==
The municipality bordered Anjala, Valkeala, Luumäki, Vehkalahti and Kymi. It was located to the east of the Kymijoki.

=== Villages ===
- Enäjärvi
- Haapala
- Hirvelä
- Kaipiainen
- Liikkala
- Mämmälä (including Inkeroinen)
- Ruotila
- Saaramaa
- Sippola (Sippolan kirkonkylä), initially known as Anikkala
- Viiala (including Myllykoski and Keltakangas)

== History ==
Sippola's central village (the churchby) was initially known as Anikkala, first mentioned in 1544 when it was a part of the Vehkalahti parish. The name Sippola is derived from a farm name Sippula, in 1558 owned by Tuomas Sippu. The earlier name Anikkala was displaced by Sippola in the late 16th century.

The first chapel in Sippula was built by the potentate, baron Lorentz Creutz, who owned a seat manor in the area. Creutz had received several farms in several local villages as fief and then Creutz eagerly formed a domain under his ownership out of some of them. A new church was built in 1737. The manor was destroyed by Russian occupants before the Treaty of Turku in 1743. In 1784, Sippola manor was acquired by the von Daehn family. Sippola became a chapel community in 1823 and was separated from Vehkalahti since 1843 (what happened in 1861 which erroneously was earlier claimed here as date of separation).

In Viiala village, a remarkable sawmill was established in the early 1700s. This community started an industrial village. In the late 1800s, a paper mill was established in this village by the Björnberg industrialist family. The paper mill was called Myllykoski and the entire industrial village began to be called that, instead of Viiala.

The Empress Catherine the Great fiefed in the early 1790s the Liikkala donation to the merited mathematician, Ingenieur-General Jaan-Pieter Corneliuszoon van Suchtelen, later Count Suchtelen, leader of the occupation of Viapori in 1808 and the Imperial Ambassador to Stockholm. This fief started the Liikkala manor.

A wood grindery and a paper factory were established in the village of Mämmälä in 1872. As they were established on the lands of the Inkeroinen farm, the entire industrial village began to be called Inkeroinen. In 1970, most of Sippola's >10,000 inhabitants lived in either Inkeroinen or Myllykoski, while the village of Sippola only had 429 inhabitants.

Together with Anjala, Sippola formed the Anjalankoski municipality in 1975. Anjalankoski, ceasing to exist as municipal administration, later joined the town of Kouvola alongside Elimäki, Jaala, Kuusankoski and Valkeala in 2009.

== Church ==
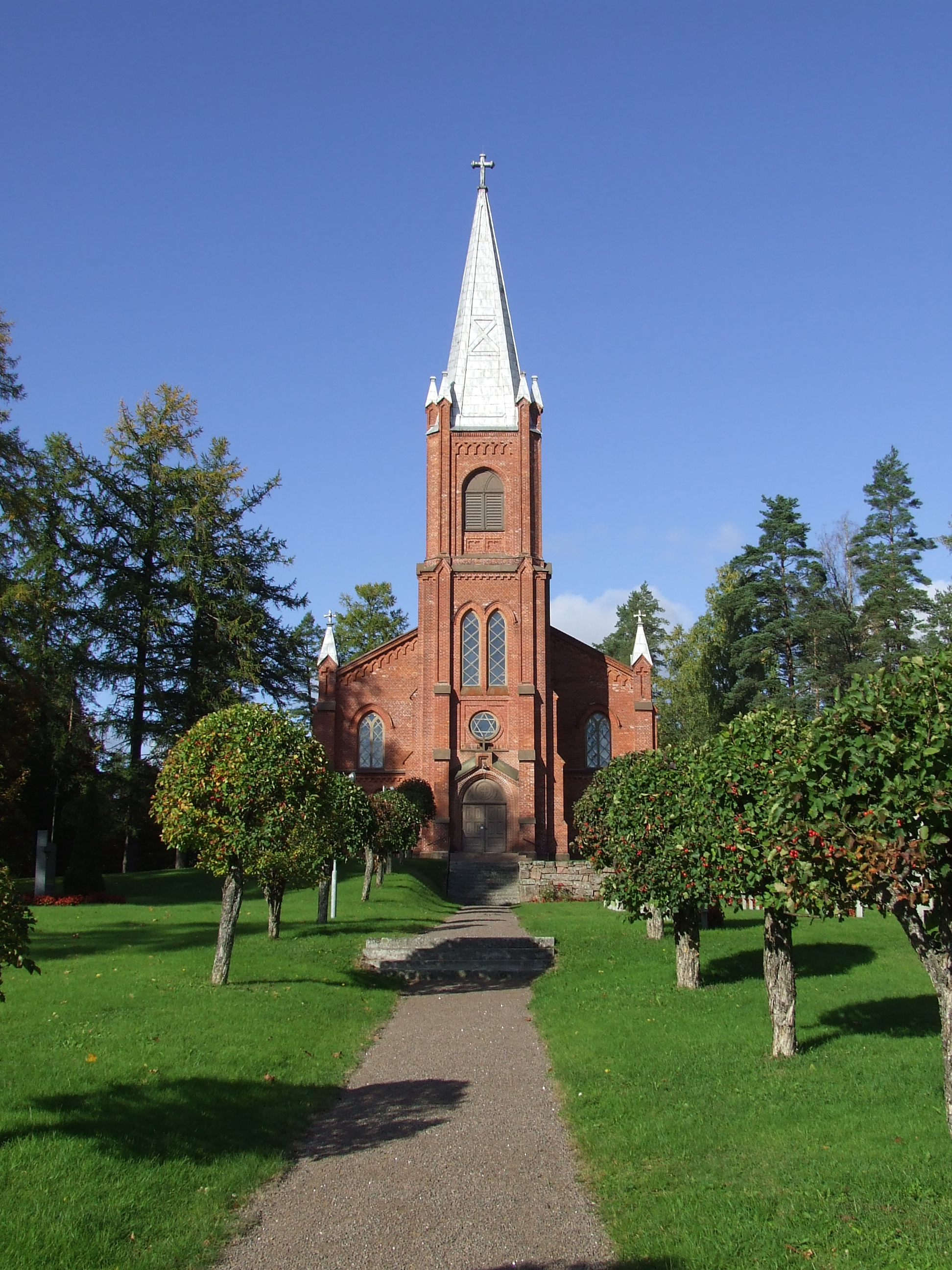

The current church of Sippola was built in 1878–1879. It was designed by C. J. von Heideken. The church was renovated in 1903 and again in 1927. Currently it acts as the main church of the Anjalankoski parish within Kouvola.
