= Huonekalu- ja Rakennustyötehdas =

Finnish furniture producer

Huonekalutehdas Korhonen Oy
- Formerly: O.Y. Huonekalu- ja Rakennustyötehdas A.B.
- Company type: osakeyhtiö
- Industry: furniture
- Founded: 15 February 1912; 114 years ago in Turku, Grand Duchy of Finland
- Headquarters: Littoinen, Kaarina, Finland
- Revenue: 1,534,000 (2014)
- Operating income: 1,983,000 (2014)

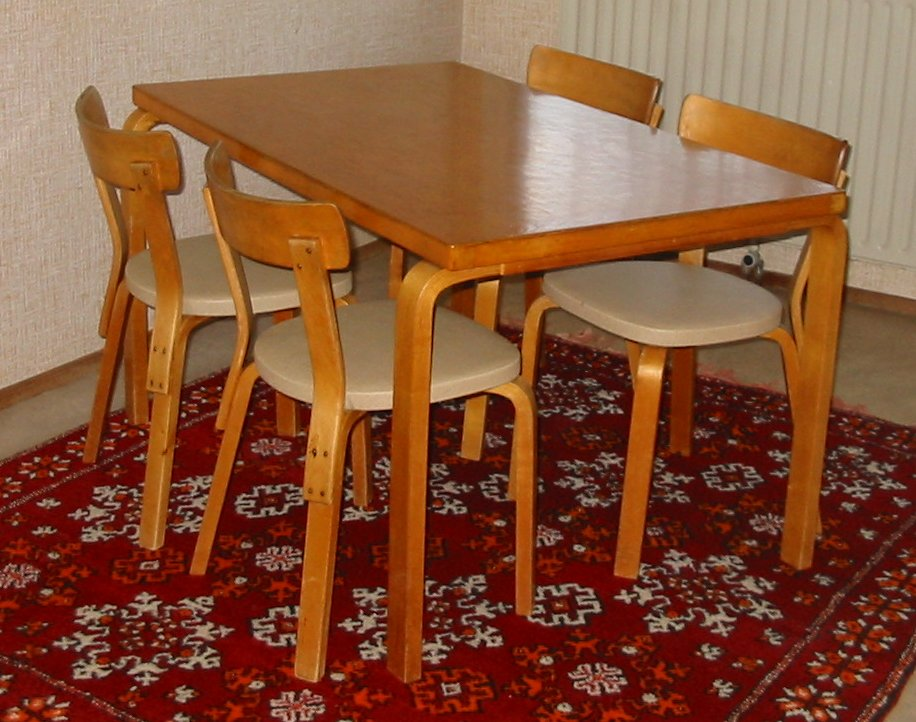
Table and chairs designed by the Aaltos

Huonekalutehdas Korhonen Oy, formerly called O.Y. Huonekalu- ja Rakennustyötehdas A.B is a former furniture producer located in Littoinen, Kaarina, Finland. The company was once known for manufacturing Alvar Aalto designed furniture.

The company was started in 1910 when Otto Korhonen and three other carpenters bought Puuseppien Osuuskunta ("Carpenters' Co-operative") based in Turku, then the Grand Duchy of Finland. Its portfolio comprised doors, windows and furniture which were produced in facilities located in Uudenmaankatu 7. The company was registered as Huonekalu- ja Rakennustyötehdas in 1912.

At the end of the 1920s Otto Korhonen partnered with architect Alvar Aalto. Aalto had recently gotten into two large projects: the Southwestern Agricultural Cooperative Building in Turku and the Paimio Sanatorium. The sanatorium was the most significant collaborative project between Korhonen and Aalto. Aalto designed the building itself; he and Korhonen designed a range of armchairs and tables for the facility's personnel and patients. Huonekalu- ja Rakennustyötehdas manufactured the furniture and other interior elements. The Paimio Sanatorium project represents the introduction of Aalto's stackable furniture designs which later influenced the American designers Charles and Ray Eames.

In the 1930s Huonekalu- ja Rakennustyötehdas developed a special wood bending method. Aalto used the technique extensively: his "Y-leg", introduced in 1947, and his "X-leg" that followed in 1954 are notable examples. The bent wooden parts became distinguishing features in many Aalto furniture designs, such as "Stacking Stool Model 60" and "Tea Trolley Model 98".

In 1966 the company was renamed Huonekalutehdas Korhonen Oy. During the subsequent decades, the company's portfolio was largely based on Aalto's design classics.

Korhonen's furniture production was sold to Artek, a subsidiary of Vitra, in 2014 and continues in Littoinen under the new name.
