= Anjalankoski =

- Town
- Anjalankosken kaupunki Anjalankoski stad
- Coat of arms

- Location of Anjalankoski in Finland
- Coordinates: 60°45′00″N 026°49′25″E
- Country: Finland
- Region: Kymenlaakso
- Charter: 1975
- City rights: 1977

Area
  - Total: 752.92 km^{2} (290.70 sq mi)
  - Land: 726.6 km^{2} (280.5 sq mi)
  - Water: 26.32 km^{2} (10.16 sq mi)

Population (12/31/2008)
  - Total: 16 379
  - Density: 22.54/km^{2} (58.4/sq mi)
- Time zone: UTC+02:00 (EET)
  - Summer (DST): UTC+03:00 (EEST)
- Postal code: 46800

Anjalankoski is a former town and municipality of Finland. It had 16 379 inhabitants in 2008. About 4/5 of the people live in the vicinity of the Kymi River. The most densely populated communities are Myllykoski and Inkeroinen. In addition, there is plenty of countryside. It was located in the Kymenlaakso region and known for its river-side settlement and industrial heritage.

The town's major industry is forestry along the Kymi Riverside. The paper factories Stora Enso Oyj and Myllykoski Paper Oy are the main employers together with the town itself.

Anjalankoski offered plenty of cultural and sport activities, including a football team, MyPa. The Anjala Manor Museum and surroundings is an interesting cultural site.

The municipality was unilingually Finnish.

Anjalankoski was formed in 1975 from the merging of the municipalities of Anjala and Sippola.

As of 2009, six municipalities – Kouvola, Kuusankoski, Elimäki, Anjalankoski, Valkeala and Jaala – were consolidated, accounting for the new municipality of Kouvola with a population of over 80,000, being the 10th largest city in Finland.

Near Anjalankoski (at 60° 41′ 32.34″ N, 27° 2′ 47.46″ E), there is 318-meter-tall (1,043 ft) TV mast, which is one of the tallest man-made objects in Finland.
