= Korpilahti Church =

Church in Jyväskylä, Finland

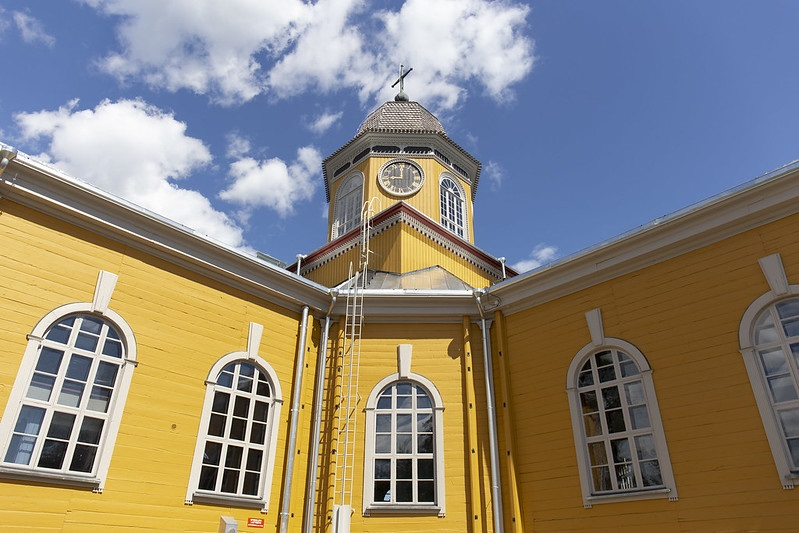

Religion
- Affiliation: Lutheran
- Region: Jyväskylä Region

Location
- Location: Korpilahti
- Interactive map of Korpilahti Church
- Coordinates: 62°1′0.03″N 25°33′20.91″E

Architecture
- Architects: A. W. Arppe, Charles Bassi
- Completed: 1826-1827
- Capacity: 756

Korpilahti Church (Finnish: Korpilahden kirkko) is a Lutheran church in Jyväskylä, Central Finland; the former municipality of Korpilahti was incorporated into Greater Jyväskylä in 2008. Korpilahti Church is almost 200 years old, dating back to 1827. The present structure is the third wooden church to have been built on that site.

A meticulous renovation was completed in 2018, restoring the church to its original appearance. The ochre-yellow hue of the exterior walls was reproduced from old exterior cladding boards that were found hidden behind the vestry porch. The clocks on the tower were repainted, and intricate decorations were exposed from under the sheet metal. The church hall was restored in the 1920s according to plans by young Alvar Aalto.

The festive appearance of the church hall is completed by the black doors with rosettes, a beautiful altar railing, the ornate patterns on the beams, the red floors, the black marble-painted lower parts of the walls, the gilded sun on the inner dome and numerous other fine details.

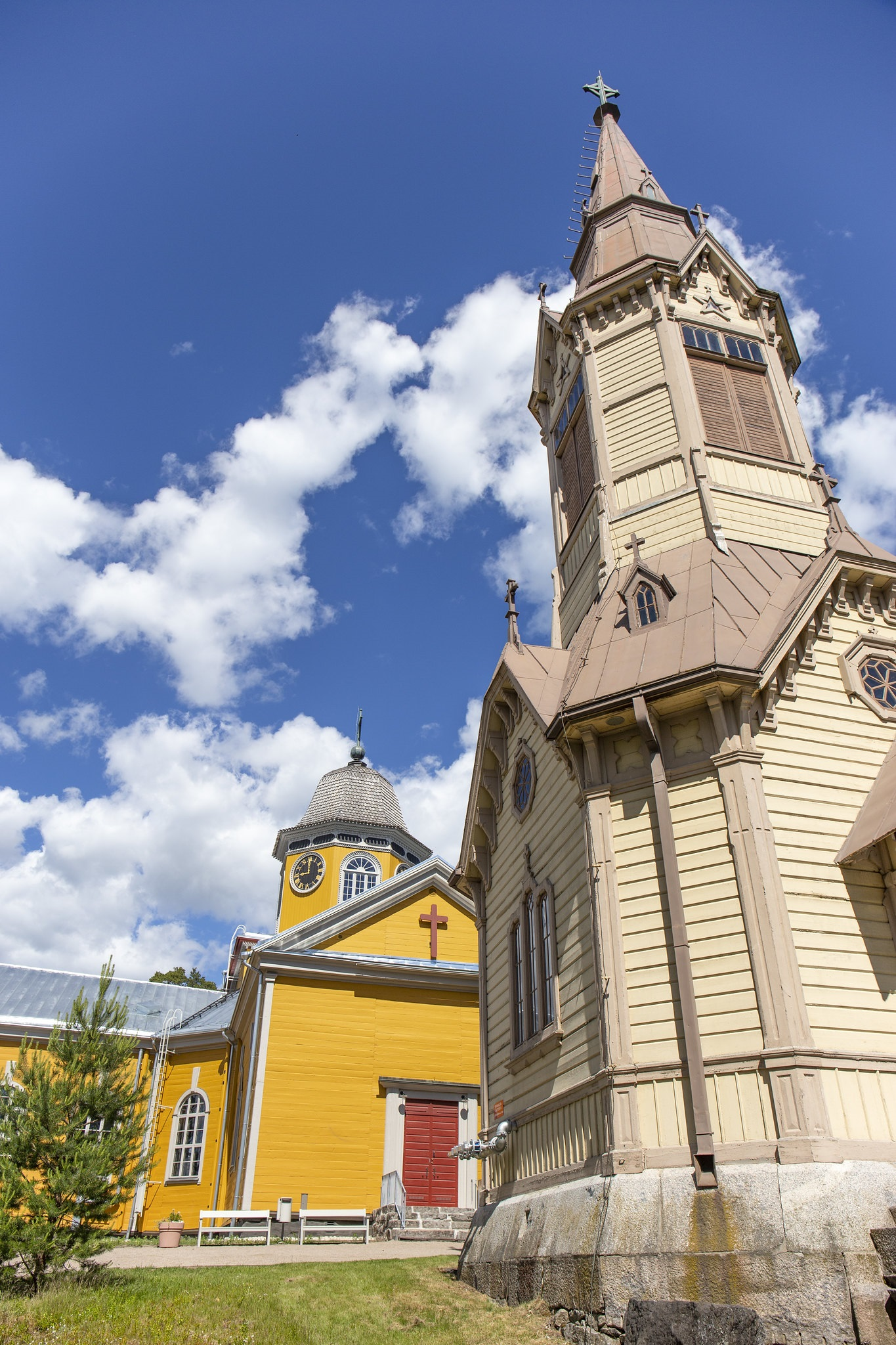
The decorative belfry next to the church was designed by Alfred Cavén and built by Gustaf Kuorikoski in 1886.

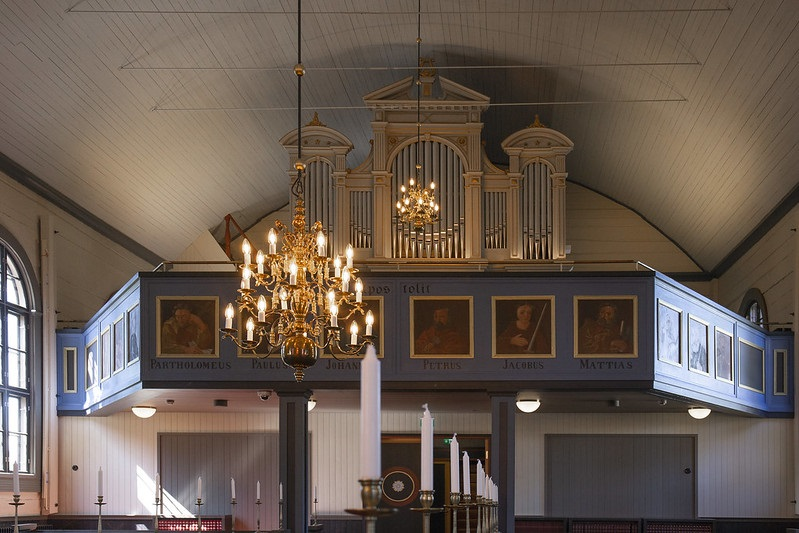
The current 22-voice organ was designed by B.A. Thulé and dates from 1904.

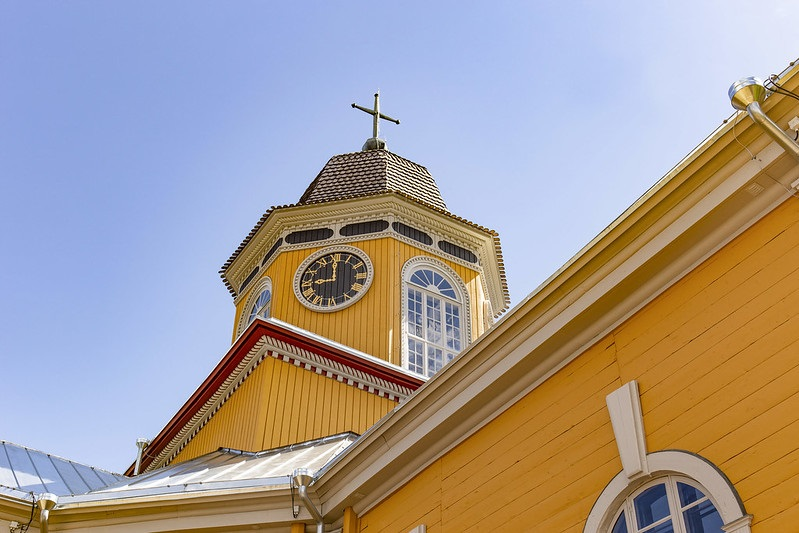
Korpilahti Church is dated back to 1827.

== History ==
The first church in Korpilahti was a modest church hut that was erected in the late 17th century on a spot next to the harbour where the military cemetery is now located. The exact year of its construction is not known, but the church bell that was installed shortly thereafter dates back to 1701. A second church building was erected on the same spot next to the Kirkkolahti “Church Bay” in the 1750s. In 1753 itinerant church-builder Arvi Junkkarinen (1716-1777) of Leppävirta began construction of cruciform church, which was completed on the same site by 18th-century master carpenter Jaakko Leppänen in 1764 and 1765, Leppänen's son, also named Jaakko (1741-1805), made a separate wooden church belfry in 1777. The lower part of the belfry is a remnant of this church building. The building later served as a grain warehouse and now houses the local history museum.

Construction of the present church was first proposed in 1813. The old building was dilapidated and no longer big enough for the community. Eventually, after a long-drawn-out process, the decision was taken to build the new church. Construction on yet a third church building, designed by A.W. Arppe and approved by the Italian-born architect Charles Bassi (1772–1840), was begun by Eerik Leppänen (1776-1856) and completed by Herman Nyberg of Hauho (now Hämeenlinna) in 1826-1827. The new church, however, was structurally weak. Based on a design by church builder Taavetti Rahikainen in 1838 the dome was replaced, giving the church its present octagonal tower. Four large columns were erected in the church hall with connecting beams supporting the dome.

Hämeenlinna architect Alfred Cavén designed the decorative belfry next to the church and it was built by Gustaf Kuorikoski in 1886.

The church underwent a major renovation on its hundredth anniversary. The plans for the renovation were made by a young architect by the name of Alvar Aalto. The extensive renovation covered the front walls of the church and redesigned the dome, ceiling and arched windows. Windbreak rooms were built for the outer doors, and the balconies were extended. The interior was also given a new colour, and brass candleholders were attached to the ends of the benches.

In 1964 conservator Thorvald Lindqvist carried out next renovations: the colour, altar railing and heating system were all renewed. The following major renovation was planned by architect Matti Huusari and completed in 1992, when the lower floor was uncovered and repaired, the tile roof was renewed and the tin roof was painted. In addition, the interior was repainted, the choir section was enlarged, and the altar railing was made into a full circle. Painter Tuomas Mäntynen decorated the supporting columns and beams of the dome with naive paintings containing Christian symbolism.

Planning for the church’s most recent major renovation began in 2015. Leaks had been detected in the room of the church, and upon closer examination it was found that the dome section had sunk by nearly 40 centimetres. Further detailed investigations also identified other major repair needs: the structure of the church dome had to be strengthened and stiffened, areas of rot had to be repaired, and the tin roof needed to be replaced. The church also had to be repainted both inside and out. As part of the renovation, the church's sprinkler and heating systems were renewed. In addition, the church's lighting and sound system were modernised, and drop-down screens and video projectors were installed at the front of the church. The chief architect of the extensive renovation was Tuija Ilves.

== Altarpieces and organs ==
Carl Fredrik Blom was commissioned to paint the exterior and interior of the church in 1839. Blom also painted an altarpiece depicting the Jesus in the Garden of Gethsemane and images of the apostles, prophets and holy wives on the sides of the balconies. The current altarpiece, Come to Me, All You Who are Weary, was painted by Professor Wilho Sjöström in 1905.

The first organ was installed in Korpilahti Church as early as 1853. Organs were still a rarity in rural churches at the time. The nearest organ had been in Kuopio, almost 200 km to the northeast. The first cantor of the church was V.T. Forsgren, father of the local poet Martti Korpilahti. The current 22-voice organ was designed by B.A. Thulé and dates from 1904. The organ has survived in its original form, albeit with the later addition of a fan, and is now part of the Sibelius Academy's collection of Finnish historical organs and protected by the National Board of Antiquities.
