= Markku Lehtosaari =

Finnish politician (born 1947)

Markku Antero Lehtosaari (born 8 November 1947 in Sääminki) is a Finnish politician. He was a member of the Parliament of Finland from 1987 to 1999, representing the Centre Party.
