= Villa Flora =

Villa Flora is an electoral parish (parroquia electorale urban) or district of Quito, Ecuador. The parish was established as a result of the October 2004 political elections when the city was divided into 19 urban electoral parishes.
