= Pihlava =

Pihlava is a surname. Notable people with the surname include:

- Agnes Pihlava (born 1980), Polish singer
- Jarno Pihlava (born 1979), Finnish swimmer
