= Vuohijärvi =

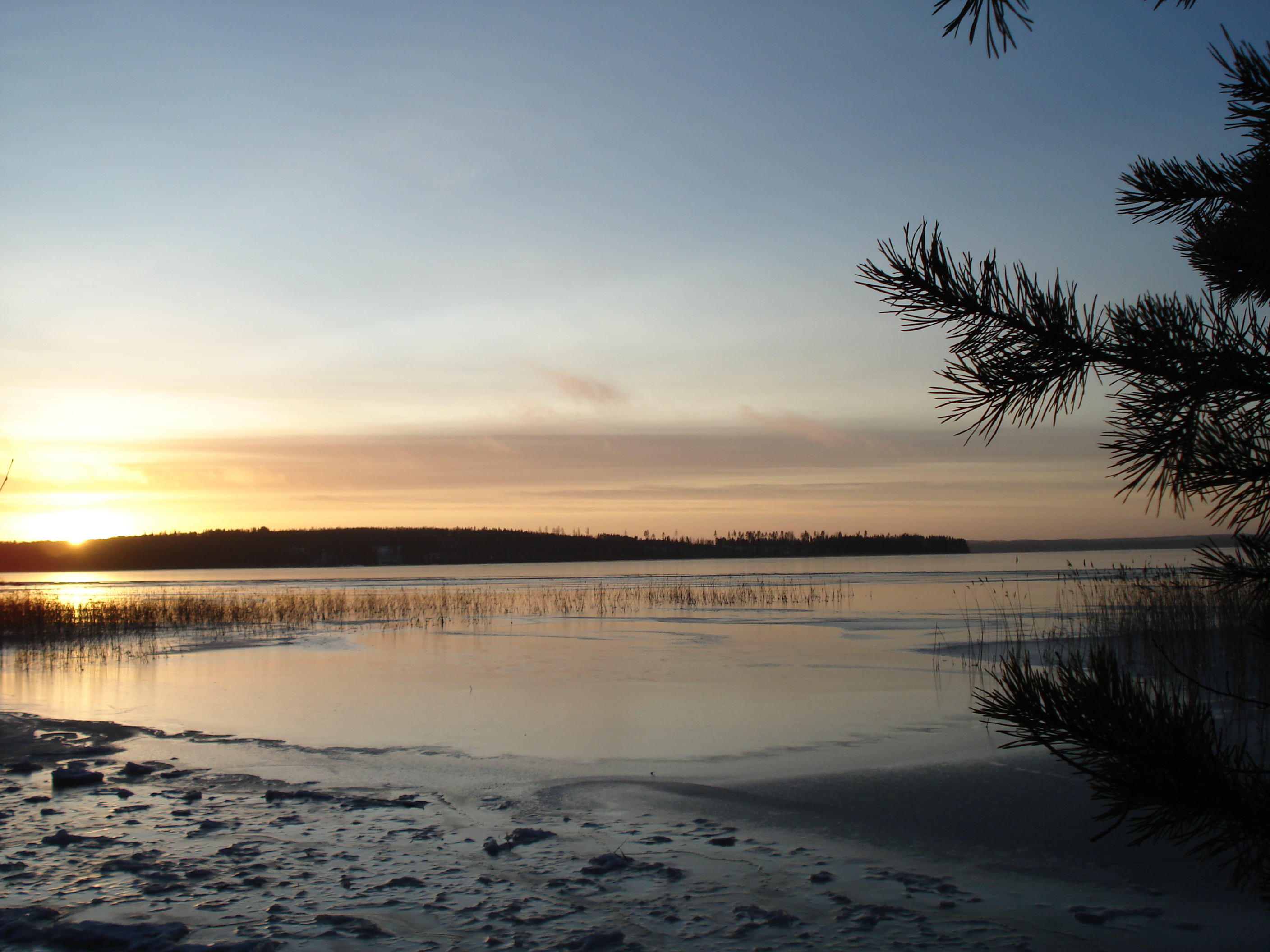
- Lake Vuohijärvi

- Location within Finland
- Coordinates: 61°12′N 26°42′E
- Type: Lake
- Catchment area: Kymijoki
- Basin countries: Finland
- Max. length: 21 km (13 mi)
- Max. width: 8 km (5.0 mi)
- Surface area: 86.243 km^{2} (33.299 sq mi)
- Average depth: 16.28 m (53.4 ft)
- Max. depth: 75.51 m (247.7 ft)
- Water volume: 1.404 km^{3} (1,138,000 acre⋅ft)
- Shore length^{1}: 228.83 km (142.19 mi)
- Surface elevation: 76.6 m (251 ft)
- Frozen: December–April
- Islands: Hevossaari, Kinansaari, Valkealan Kuisaari, Jaalan Kuisaari
- Settlements: Kouvola, Mäntyharju
- ^{1} Shore length is not a well-defined measure.

Vuohijärvi is a lake in Southern Finland. It is located on the border between the regions of Southern Savonia and Kymenlaakso, with the majority of the lake lying in Kymenlaakso. It is quite deep in comparison with other lakes in the region, with a maximum depth of 75.51 metres (247.7 ft) making it the 7th deepest lake in Finland. The ecological condition of the lake is good and the water is very clear. There are approximately 90 islands, the largest being Kinansaari.

== History ==
Vuohijärvi has a long tradition of Timber rafting.

== See also ==
- List of lakes in Finland
