= Villa Åke Gartz =

General information
- Type: Villa
- Location: Siuntio, Uusimaa, Finland
- Completed: 1945

Technical details
- Material: Timber, stone

Design and construction
- Architect: Alvar Aalto

Villa Åke Gartz is a historically significant Finnish villa located in Siuntio, Uusimaa. The villa, which was designed by the renowned architect Alvar Aalto between 1944 and 1945, functioned as home for the former minister and Deputy Managing Director of Ahlstrom Oy, Vuorineuvos Åke Gartz, at the company's expense.

== History and architecture ==
The framework of the villa was an old school located in the village of Evitskog, on the Siuntio side of the border. Aalto was not content with merely renovating the old school; he completely transformed its character. Aalto added an entirely new wing to the building thus creating a sheltered courtyar, a characteristic method he used to organise space.

The building's formerly institutional nature was converted into a cozy private residence through the use of wood slating, natural organic shapes, and large window surfaces. The high-ceilinged classrooms of the old school were transformed into a prestigious salon. This explains why Villa Gartz features significantly higher rooms than many other private houses typical of that era.

== Materials and landscape ==
Aalto utilised various materials and techniques to integrate the old school building's tall, box-like shape into Siuntio's rocky terrain. The design emphasised a heavy, rustic natural stone foundation, which visually anchors the house to the ground. By using horizontal exterior siding and extending the eaves, Aalto broke the building's original vertical lines.

As a result, the building appears as a low, sprawling villa rather than a tall institution. The entrance was redesigned to be more inviting with natural wooden columns and canopies. The original small windows were replaced with expansive glass surfaces or window groups that emphasised horizontality and flooded the interior with light.

== Interior ==
Although Gartz himself participated in planning the room layout, the villa's fireplace is purely Aalto's handiwork. Typical of residential houses from 1944–1945, the fireplace is a white-plastered, sculptural form that creates a contrast against the dark wooden structure of the old school.

Aalto also used split levels and varying ceiling heights within the interior to define spaces without the need for heavy partition walls.

== Architectural significance ==
Villa Åke Gartz is an excellent example of Finnish architecture from the reconstruction era after the Second World War. Due to post-war scarcity, architects had to be inventive; instead of monuments, the focus shifted toward transforming what already existed.

The use of natural stone is a trademark of Aalto's mid-1940s style, also seen in works such as Villa Mairea and Aalto's own Muuratsalo Experimental House.
