= Lake Mallos =

- Location within Finland
- Location: Kangasniemi
- Coordinates: 62°1′N 26°43′E
- Type: Lake
- Catchment area: Kymijoki
- Basin countries: Finland
- Surface area: 10.157 km^{2} (3.922 sq mi)
- Average depth: 3.99 m (13.1 ft)
- Max. depth: 12.4 m (41 ft)
- Water volume: 0.0405 km^{3} (32,800 acre⋅ft)
- Shore length^{1}: 52.2 km (32.4 mi)
- Surface elevation: 102.2 m (335 ft)
- Frozen: December–April
- Islands: Härkösaari, Lehtosaari
- ^{1} Shore length is not a well-defined measure.

Lake Mallos (Finnish: Mallos) is a medium-sized lake in Finland. It is situated in the municipality of Kangasniemi in the Southern Savonia region in eastern Finland. The lake belongs to the Kymijoki main catchment area.

== See also ==
- List of lakes in Finland
