= Karhula =

- Former municipality
- Karhulan kauppala Karhula köping
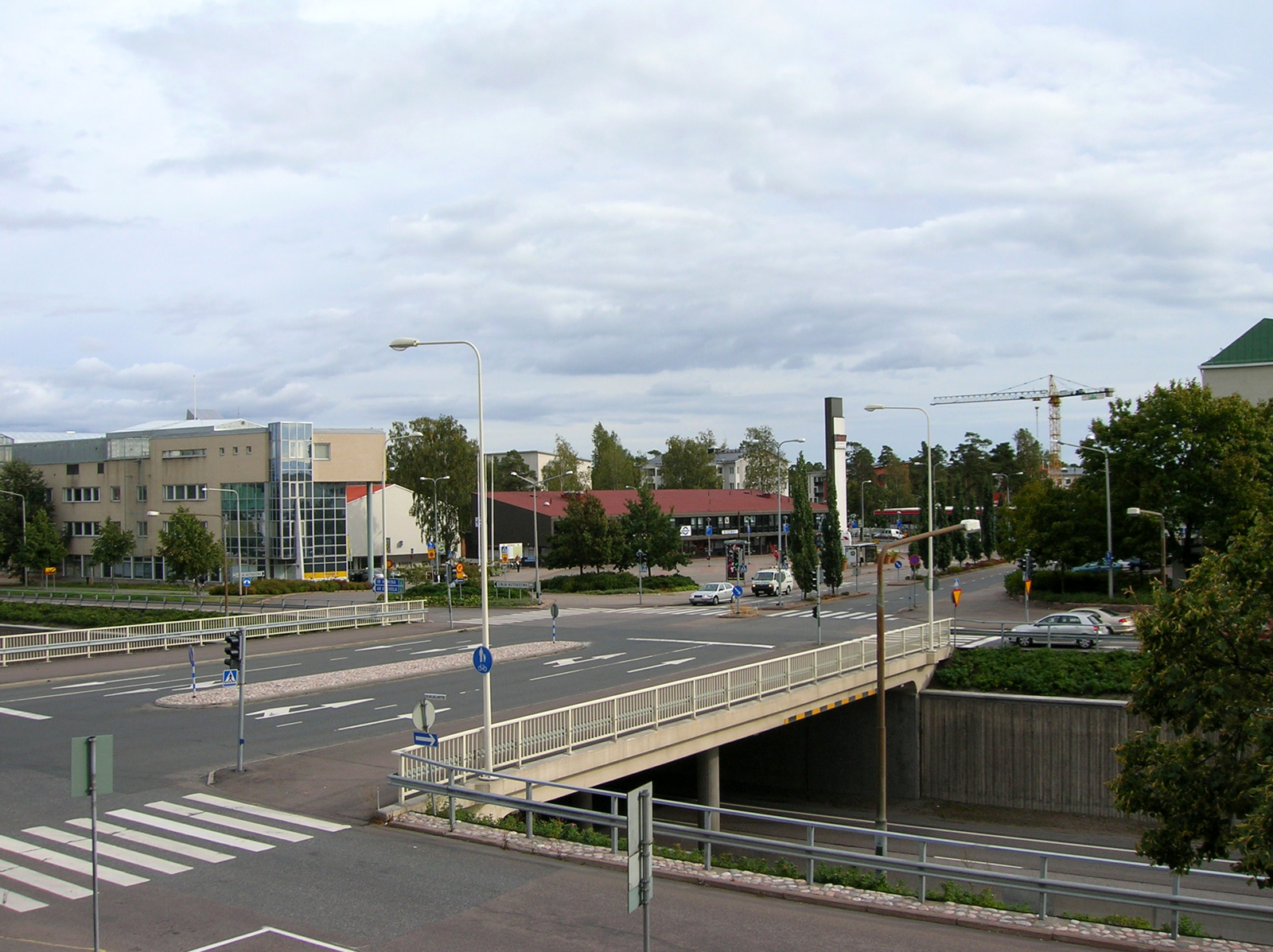
- The centre of Karhula.

- Coat of arms

- Location of Karhula in Finland
- Coordinates: 60.5154611°N 26.9354215°E
- Country: Finland
- Province: Kymi Province
- Region: Kymenlaakso
- Established: 1951
- Merged into Kotka: 1977
- Seat: Helilä

Area
  - Land: 44.3 km^{2} (17.1 sq mi)

Population (1976-12-31)
  - Total: 22,686

Karhula is a former market town (kauppala) and a former municipality of Finland in the former Kymi Province, now in the Kymenlaakso region. It was consolidated with the town of Kotka in 1977. Its seat was in Helilä, however the municipality was named after the industrial area of Karhula (also known as Karhulanniemi).

The bears on the former coat of arms refer to the name of the municipality (Karhula literally means "place of bear"), while the hammers in their hands refer to the industrial history of Karhula. The coat of arms was designed by Ahti Hammar, and it was approved for use on 10 November 1955.

== Geography ==
The municipality bordered Kotka, Kymi and Vehkalahti.

== History ==
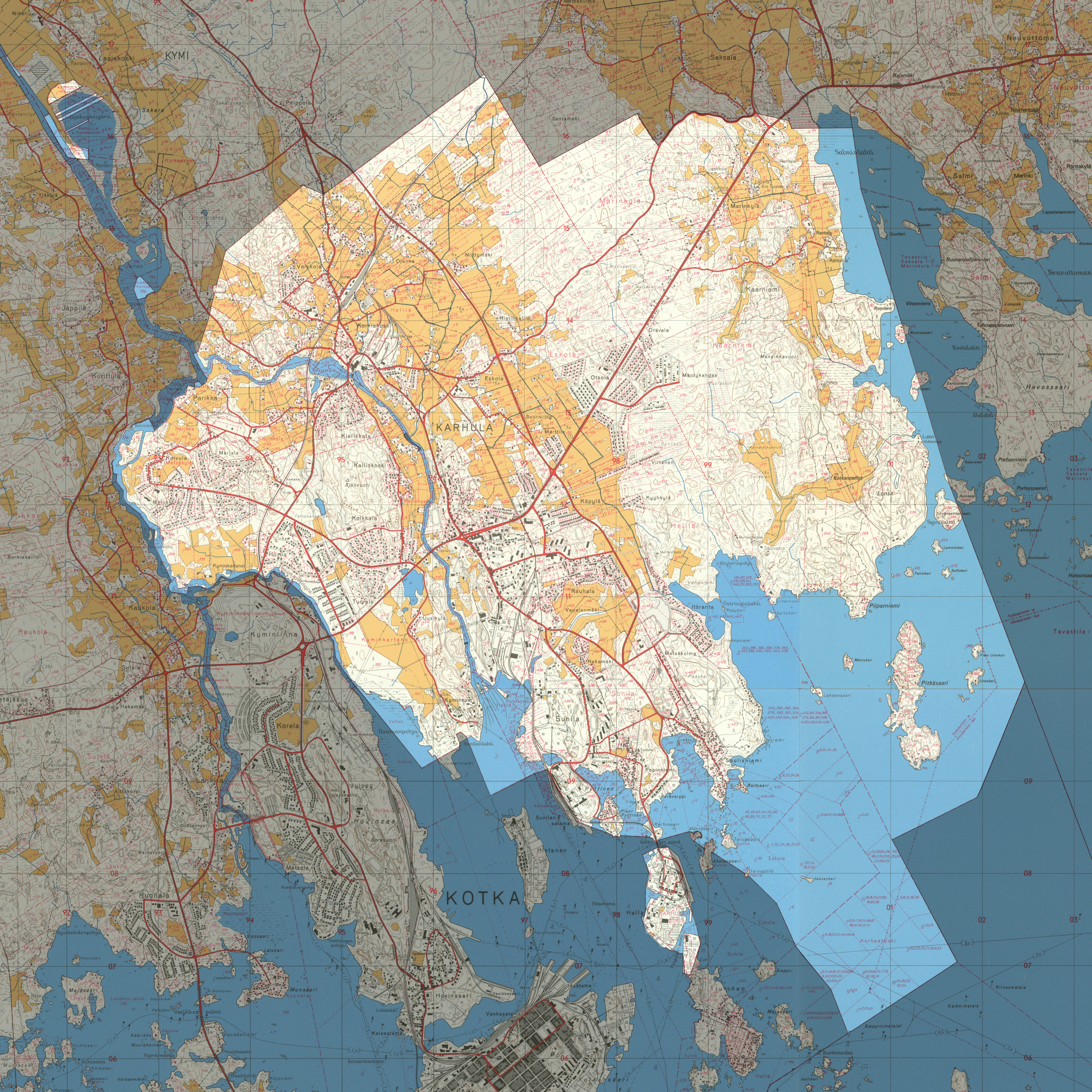
Karhula in 1968.

Karhula was originally the name of a seat farm in the village of Helilä in the parish of Pyhtää and the chapel community of Kymi. As the population in the area increased, the village that had formed around the farm began to be called Karhula. As a village name, Karhula is first mentioned in 1624. Kymi became a separate parish from Pyhtää in 1642.

In 1951, Kymi's main village Helilä, along with the industrial areas of Karhulanniemi, Sunila and Korkeakoski, were separated to form the municipality of Karhula. Kymi's municipal administration was still located in Helilä. Ecclesiastically Karhula was still subordinate to Kymi, never acquiring its own parish.

In 1977, Karhula and Kymi were consolidated with Kotka.

=== Industrial history ===
Glass production in Karhula started in 1888. Much of the glassware produced in the factory was exported to Saint Petersburg. In the 1930s, the factory produced Alvar Aalto's designer glassware including Aalto vases. After the sale of beer became freer in the 1960s, bottles became the factory's primary type of glassware. The American company Owens-Illinois acquired the factory in 1995. The factory was closed in 2009, leaving 106 people unemployed.

The Korkeakoski wood grindery was established in 1887 and expanded in 1920. Finland's first fiberboard factory was established in Korkeakoski in 1930.

== Sport ==
The Kotkan Motor Center is a motorsport complex approximately 9 kilometres north of the town, adjacent to Kymi Airfield. It features a motocross circuit and a car race track. It also has a motorcycle track, which once hosted motorcycle speedway. As a speedway track it hosted the Finnish Individual Speedway Championship final as part of the qualifying for the Speedway World Championship in 1988 and a qualifying round of the Speedway World Team Cup in 1990.
