= Arkkitehti =

Finnish architecture magazine

- ARK logo
- Editor: Kristo Vesikansa
- Former editors: Jorma Mukala
- Frequency: 6 issues a year
- Publisher: Finnish Association of Architects (SAFA)
- First issue: 1903
- Country: Finland
- Based in: Helsinki
- Language: Finnish and English
- Website: www.ark.fi
- ISSN: 0783-3660

Arkkitehti (in English: Finnish Architectural Review) is a Finnish architectural journal, which has been published since 1903. It was originally published only in Swedish, Arkitekten, as a supplement to the journal Tekniska Föreningen [The Engineering Society of Finland]. The journal's first editor was Bertel Jung, secretary of the Architects' Club (predecessor of the Finnish Association of Architects, SAFA). The journal ceased publication during the Finnish Civil War (1918), but reappeared in both Swedish and Finnish versions in 1921, since when it has appeared regularly, initially 12 times a year and currently 6 times a year. It is currently published as a bilingual journal, with texts in Finnish and English (it is the only bilingual Nordic architectural publication). Architectural Competitions in Finland is published as a supplement to the journal.

== Editors in Chief ==
- 2022- Kristo Vesikansa
- 2009–2022 Jorma Mukala
- 2000–2008 Harri Hautajärvi
- 1996–1999 Esa Laaksonen
- 1992–1995 Pentti Kareoja
- 1988–1992 Kaarin Taipale
- 1981–1988 Marja-Riitta Norri
- 1977–1980 Markku Komonen
- 1972–1977 Jussi Vepsäläinen
- 1971 Esko Lehesmaa
- 1969–1970 Tapani Eskola
- 1967–1968 Kirmo Mikkola
- 1960–1966 Pekka Laurila
- 1958–1959 Nils-Erik Wickberg
- 1956–1957 Aarno Ruusuvuori
- 1952–1956 Nils-Erik Wickberg
- 1950–1951 Veikko Larkas
- 1946–1949 Nils-Erik Wickberg
- 1941–1945 Aulis Blomstedt
- 1937–1940 Yrjö Lindegren
- 1935–1936 Yrjö Laine
- 1931–1934 Hilding Ekelund
- 1928–1930 Martti Välikangas
- 1921–1927 Carolus Lindberg
- 1917–1919 Alarik Tawaststjerna
- 1912–1916 Birger Brunila
- 1908–1911 Sigurd Frosterus
- 1906–1907 Waldemar Wilenius
- 1903–1905 Bertel Jung
