= Kymi, Finland =

Former rural municipality in Finland

Coordinates: 60.5074°N 26.9043°E

Kymi Kymmene
- Former municipality
- The former coat of arms of Kymi
- Interactive map of Kymi

Kymi (Swedish: Kymmene) was a rural municipality in Finland, located in Kymenlaakso on the coast, about 100 km east of Helsinki. Kymi is now part of Kotka. Its population in 1939 was 21,241, and in 1944, it was 20,924.

== See also ==
- Kymi (river)
