= Kymenlaakso =

Region of Finland

Kymenlaakso Kymmenedalen
- Region
- Region of Kymenlaakso; Kymenlaakson maakunta (Finnish); Landskapet Kymmenedalen (Swedish)
- Coat of arms

- Kymenlaakso on a map of Finland
- Coordinates: 60°30′N 027°00′E
- Country: Finland
- Historical province: Uusimaa, Karelia, Tavastia
- Former provinces: Fief of Viborg; Viborg and Nyslott County; Kymmenegård and Nyslott County; Vyborg Governorate; Viipuri Province; Province of Kymi; Southern Finland Province
- Capitals: Kotka and Kouvola
- Other town: Hamina

Government
  - Regional Mayor: Jaakko Mikkola

Area
  - Total: 4,558.54 km^{2} (1,760.06 sq mi)

Population (2019)
  - Total: 174,167
  - Density: 38.2068/km^{2} (98.9550/sq mi)

GDP
  - Total: €6.158 billion (2015)
  - Per capita: €34,350 (2015)
- Time zone: UTC+2 (EET)
  - Summer (DST): UTC+3 (EEST)
- ISO 3166 code: FI-09
- NUTS: 186
- Regional animal: Eurasian otter (Lutra lutra)
- Regional bird: Eurasian bullfinch (Pyrrhula pyrrhula)
- Regional fish: European sprat (Sprattus sprattus)
- Regional flower: Yellow Iris (Iris pseudacorus)
- Regional stone: Rapakivi granite
- Regional lake: Lake Vuohijärvi
- Website: www.kymenlaakso.fi

Kymenlaakso (Finnish: [ˈkymenˌlɑːkso]; Swedish: Kymmenedalen; lit. "Kymi/Kymmene Valley") is a region in Finland. It borders the regions of Uusimaa, Päijät-Häme, South Savo and South Karelia and Russia (Leningrad Oblast). Its name means literally The Valley of River Kymi. Kymijoki is one of the biggest rivers in Finland with a drainage basin with 11% of the area of Finland. The city of Kotka with 51,000 inhabitants is located at the delta of River Kymi and has the most important import harbour in Finland. Other cities are Kouvola further in the inland which has after a municipal merger 81,000 inhabitants and the old bastion town Hamina.

Kymenlaakso was one of the first industrialised regions of Finland. It became the most important region for paper and pulp industry in Finland. Since the late 1900s many plants have closed, which has caused some deindustrialisation, unemployment and population decline in Kymenlaakso, especially in those communities that were built around plants in Kouvola.

== Historical provinces ==
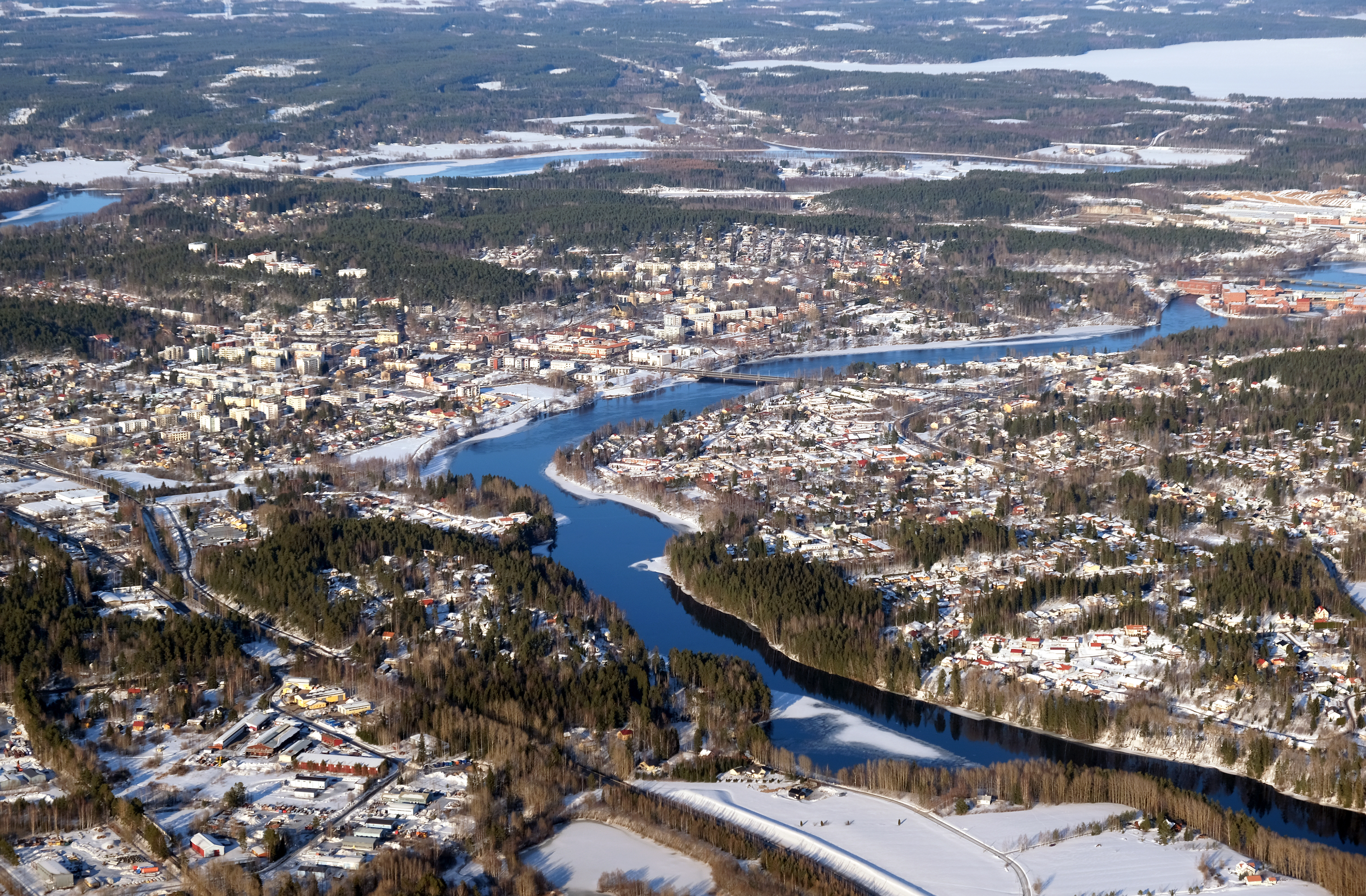
The Kymi River in Kouvola

For history, geography and culture see: Uusimaa, Karelia and Tavastia

== Municipalities ==
The region of Kymenlaakso consists of two sub-regions and six municipalities, three of which have city status (marked in bold).

=== Municipalities on the map ===
Cities and municipalities of Kymenlaakso.

=== Sub-regions ===
Kotka-Hamina sub-region

- **Kotka**
- **Hamina** (Fredrikshamn)
- Pyhtää (Pyttis)
- Virolahti (Vederlax)
- Miehikkälä

Kouvola sub-region

- **Kouvola**

=== Municipalities listed ===
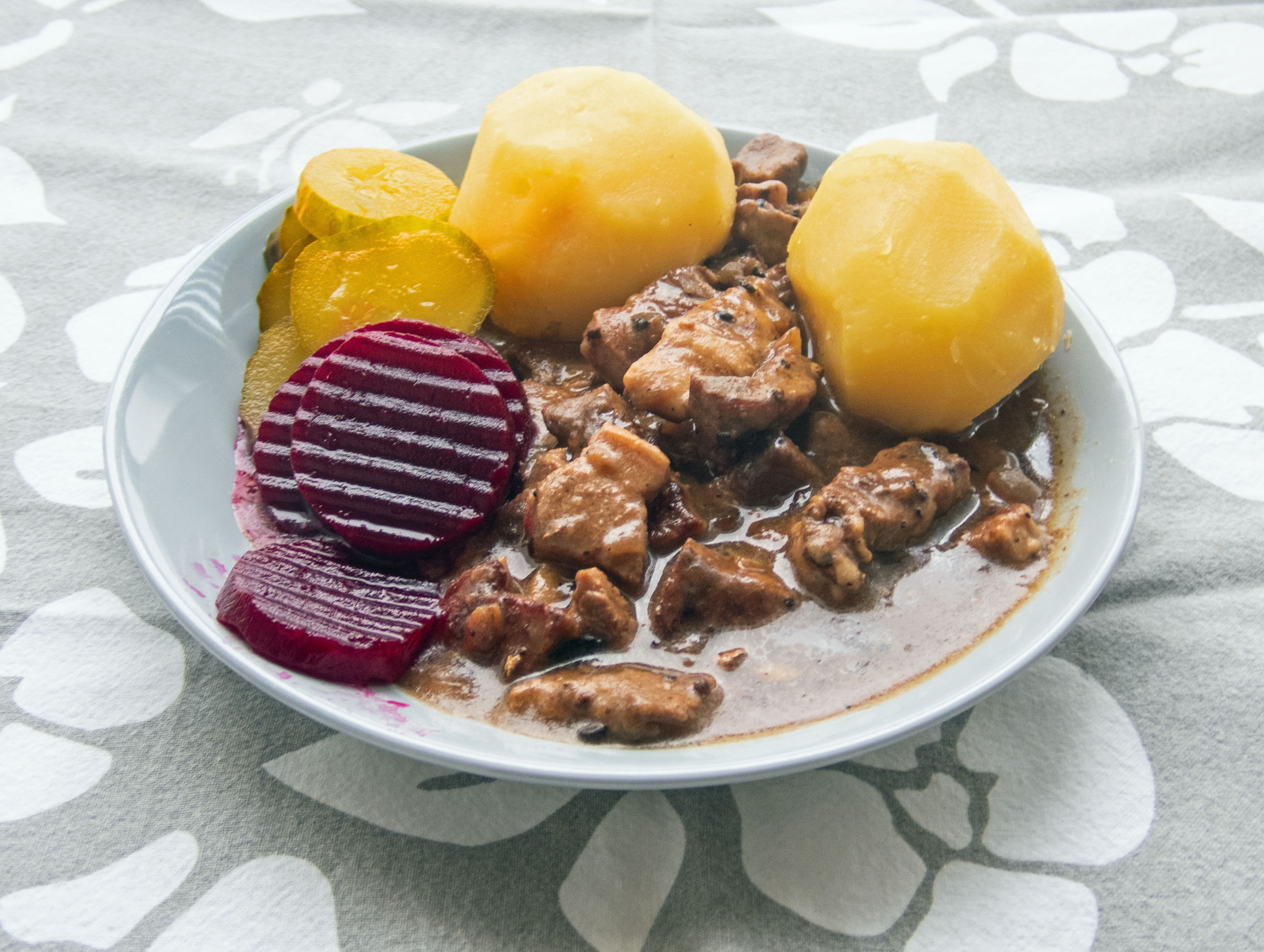
Läskisoosi

Coat of arms	Municipality	Population	Land area (km^{2})	Density (/km^{2})	Finnish speakers	Swedish speakers	Other speakers
Coat of arms of Hamina	Hamina	19,113	610	31	91 %	0.3 %	9 %
Coat of arms of Kotka	Kotka	50,029	272	184	87 %	0.9 %	12 %
Coat of arms of Kouvola	Kouvola	77,625	2,558	30	93 %	0.4 %	6 %
Coat of arms of Miehikkälä	Miehikkälä	1,664	423	4	93 %	0 %	7 %
Coat of arms of Pyhtää	Pyhtää	5,016	325	15	88 %	6.5 %	5 %
Coat of arms of Virolahti	Virolahti	2,751	372	7	93 %	0.4 %	7 %
	Total	156,198	4,559	34.3	91 %	0.7 %	8 %

=== Former municipalities ===
Municipalities of Kymenlaakso in 1965

- Haapasaari (to Kotka in 1974)
- Anjala (formed Anjalankoski with Sippola in 1975)
- Sippola (formed Anjalankoski with Anjala in 1975)
- Karhula (to Kotka in 1977)
- Kymi (to Kotka in 1977)
- Vehkalahti (to Hamina in 2003)
- Anjalankoski (to Kouvola in 2009)
- Elimäki (to Kouvola in 2009)
- Jaala (to Kouvola in 2009)
- Kuusankoski (to Kouvola in 2009)
- Valkeala (to Kouvola in 2009)
- Iitti was transferred to Päijät-Häme Region in 2021

== Demographics ==
Population size 1990–2025
Year	Population
1990	186,030
1995	184,595
2000	179,940
2005	177,931
2010	175,377
2015	171,778
2020	162,812
2025	156,198

== Politics ==
For parliamentary elections, Kymenlaakso, together with the regions of South Karelia and South Savo, is part of the Southeast Finland constituency. The constituency elects 15 of the 200 members of the Parliament of Finland.
