= Hilkka =

Surname list

Hilkka is the given name of the following people:

- Hilkka Kemppi (born 1988), Finnish politician
- Hilkka Nenonen, Finnish diplomat
- Hilkka Rantaseppä-Helenius (1925–1975), Finnish astronomer
- Hilkka Riihivuori (born 1952), Finnish cross-country skier
- Hilkka Toivola (1909–2002), Finnish artist
- Hilkka Vahervuori (born 1942), Finnish long track speed skater
