= Langinkoski =

Rapid on the Kymi, Kotka, Finland

Coordinates: 60°29′19.6″N 26°53′05.3″E

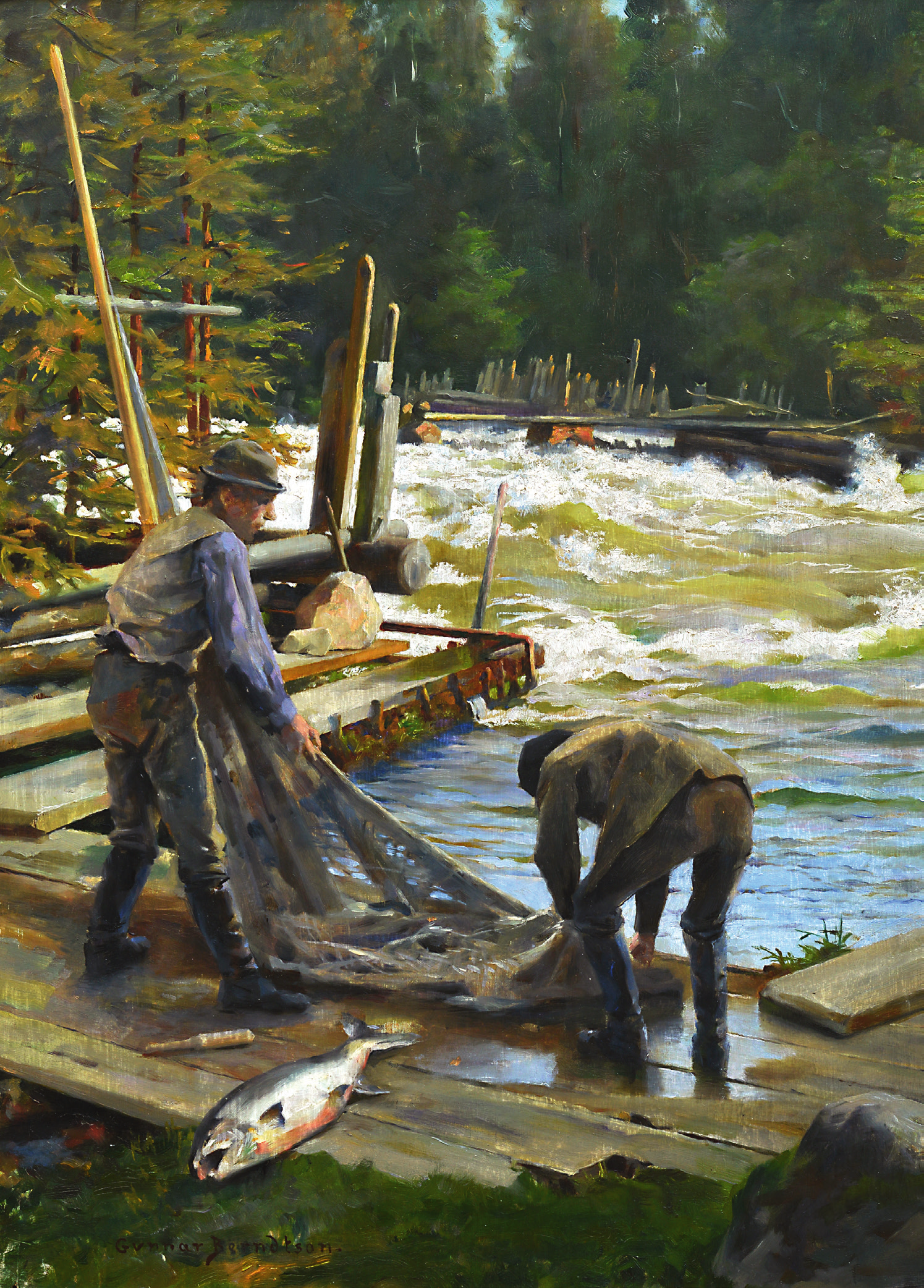
Salmon Fishers at the Langinkoski Rapid by Gunnar Berndtson in 1892

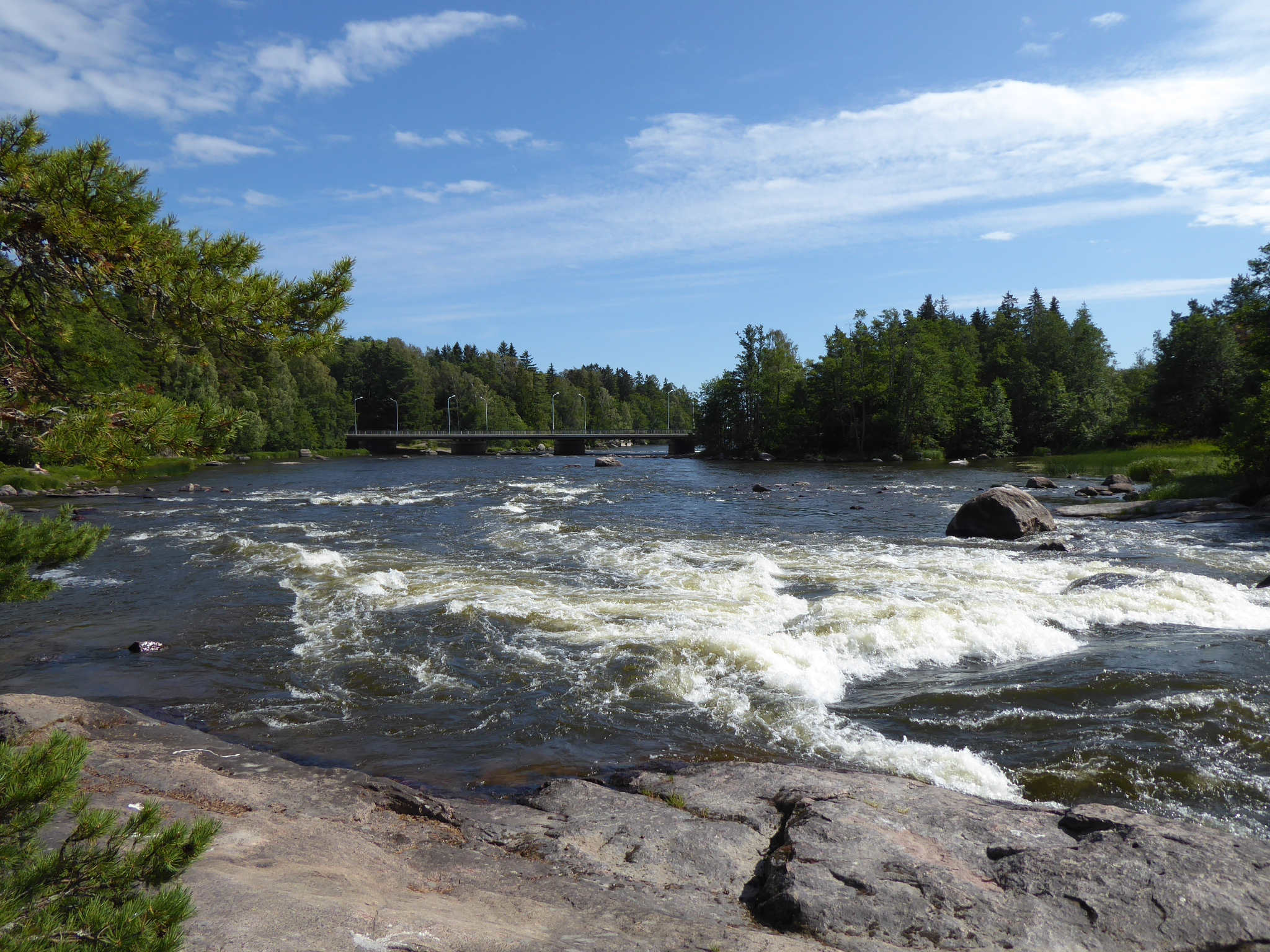
Lower part of Langinkoski rapid in July 2023

Langinkoski is a rapid on the Kymi river in Kotka, Finland. Langinkoski has been called one of the best salmon rapids in Finland.

== Imperial Fishing Lodge ==
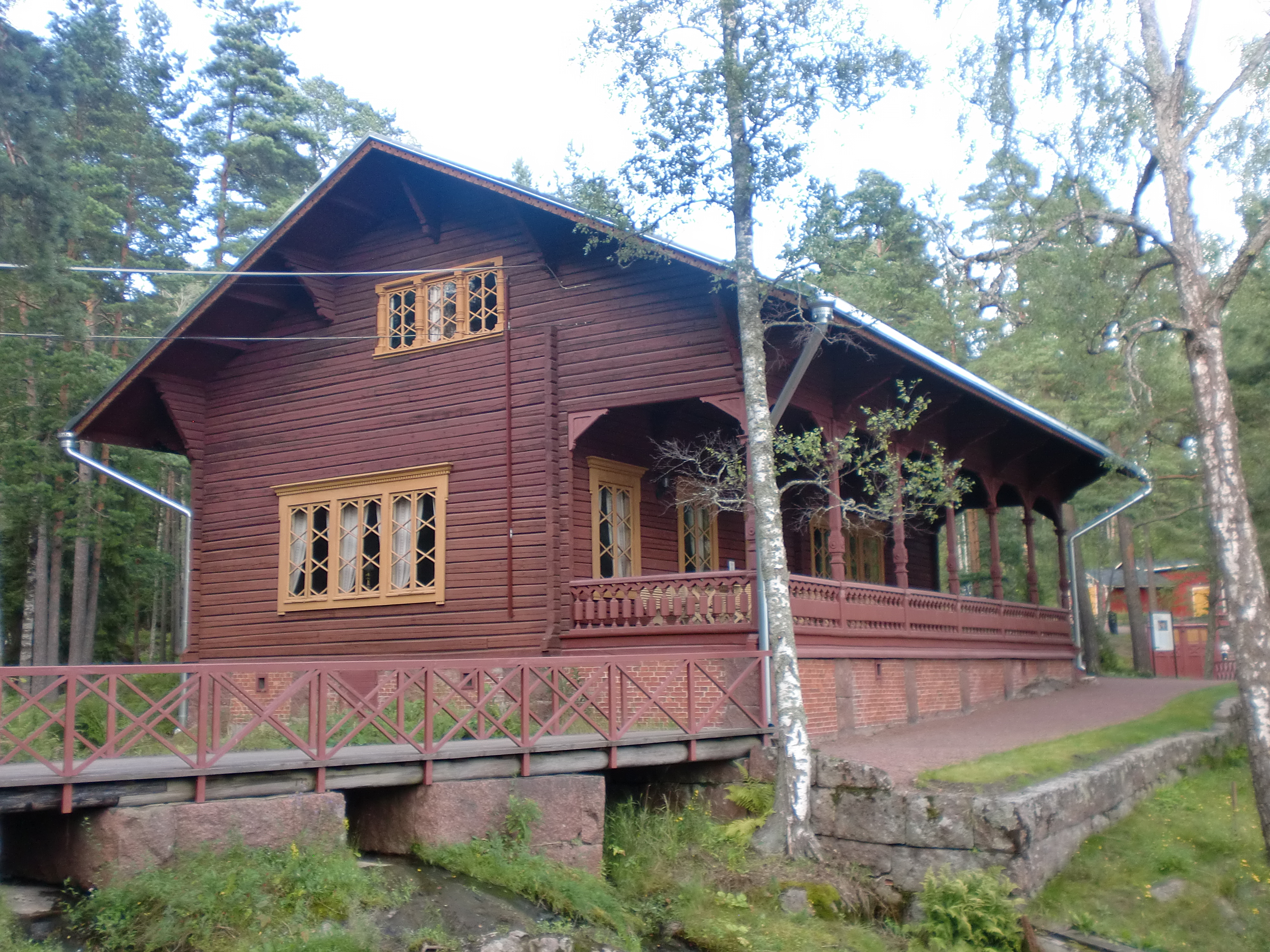
The fishing dacha of Alexander III of Russia at Langinkoski

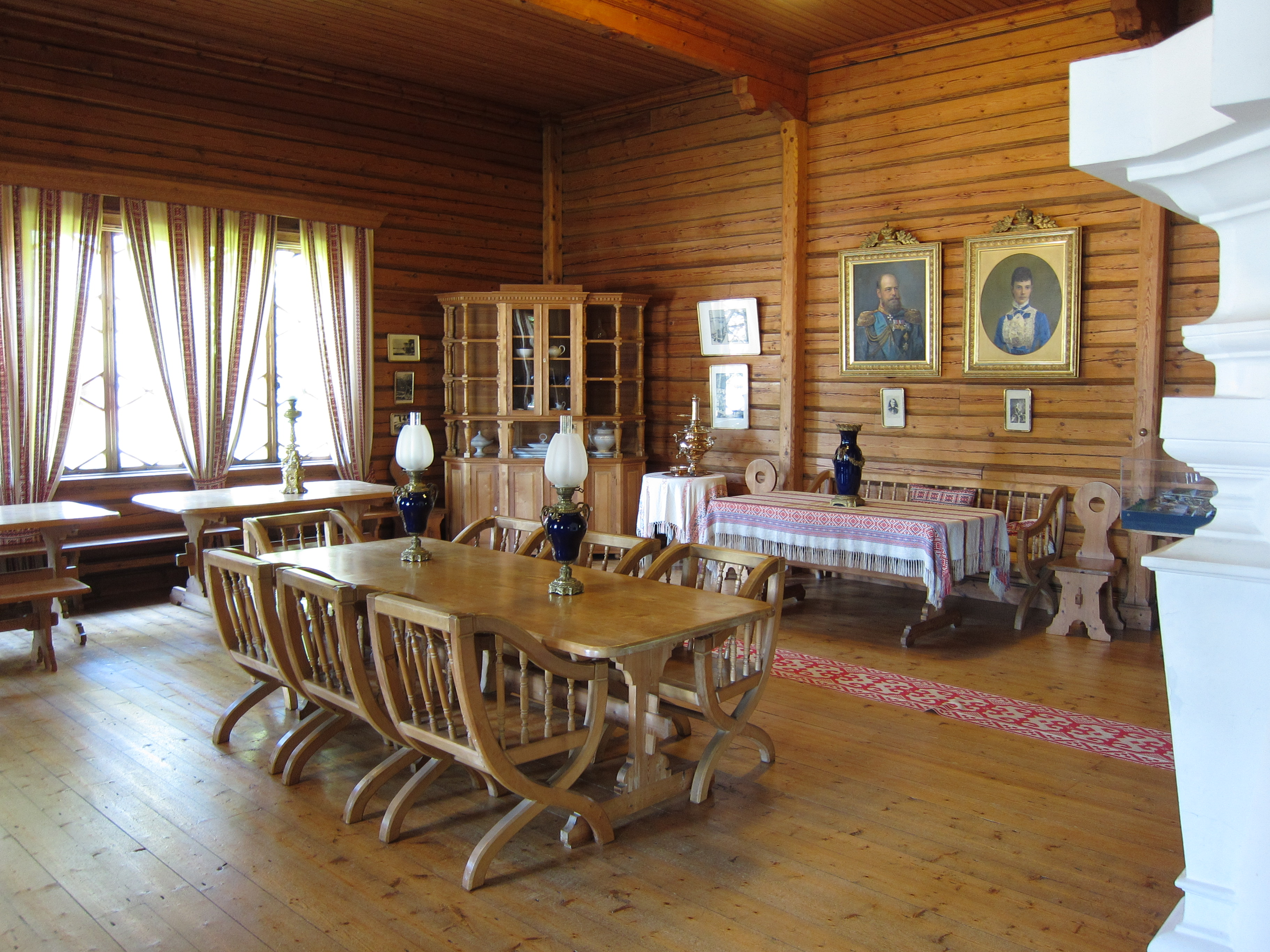
The fishing dacha in inside

The interior decoration of the lodge was almost entirely designed and manufactured in Finland. The pieces of furniture in the sitting room were manufactured by local cabinetmakers, the textiles by Tampella in Tampere, the chinaware by Arabia in Helsinki, the axe by Billnäs, the wine and drinking glasses by Karhula Glassworks, and the kitchen stove by Högfors - all well-known firms, most of which still exist today, apart from Tampella.

== Imperial Visits ==
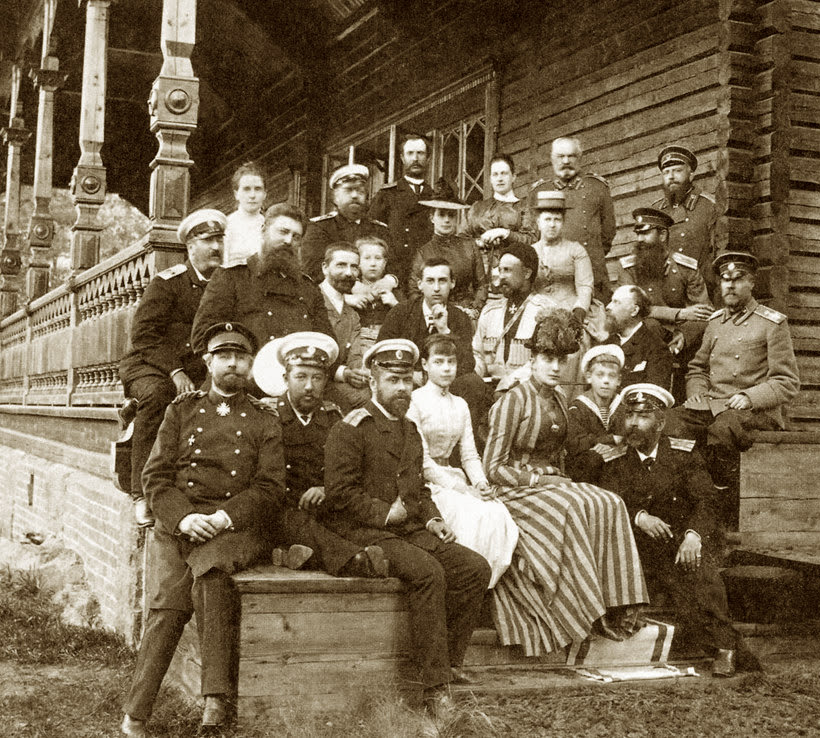
Emperor Alexander III and Empress Maria Feodorovna in the family circle on the porch of his home in Langinkoski

=== Tsar Alexander III ===
At their Langinkoski lodge the imperial family led a very simple life. Alexander III was very fond of children and he took his youngest children for outings in the surroundings. The members of the imperial family used simple clothing and had uncomplicated food to eat.

Empress Maria Feodorovna knew how to cook and at Langinkoski she had an opportunity of devoting herself to that hobby. It is known also that she did not like washing the dishes.

Some years ago a photograph taken at Langinkoski was found in the Russian State Archives in Saint Petersburg. The picture shows Empress Maria Feodorovna sitting on the kitchen porch busying herself with cooking. The young officer to the right is Grand Duke George, her second youngest son. This probably was his only visit to Langinkoski. He had caught tuberculosis and the doctors had recommended for him to live in a mountain climate. He lived in the Caucasus and died there at the age of 28 years.

== Museum ==
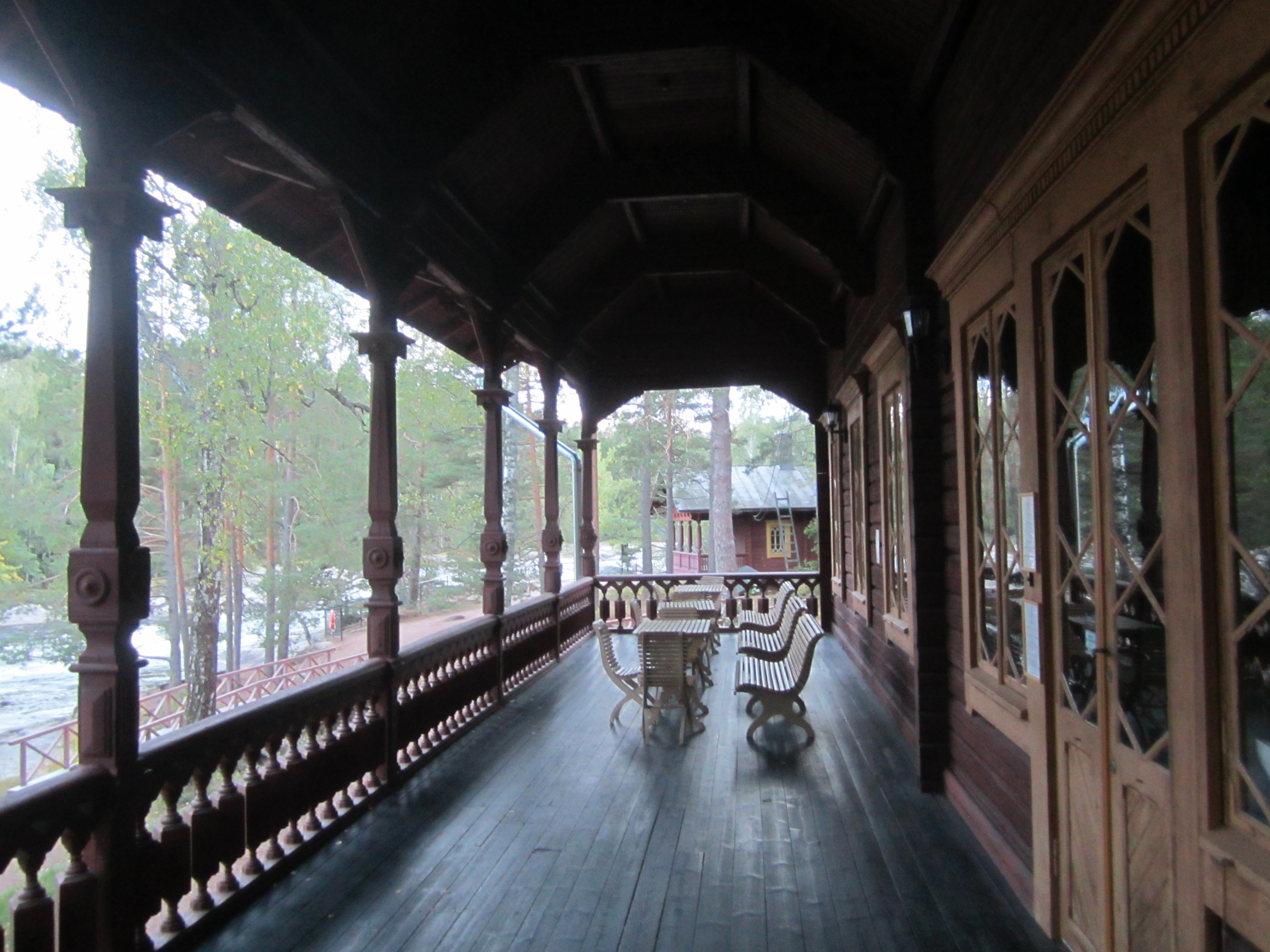
Terrace.

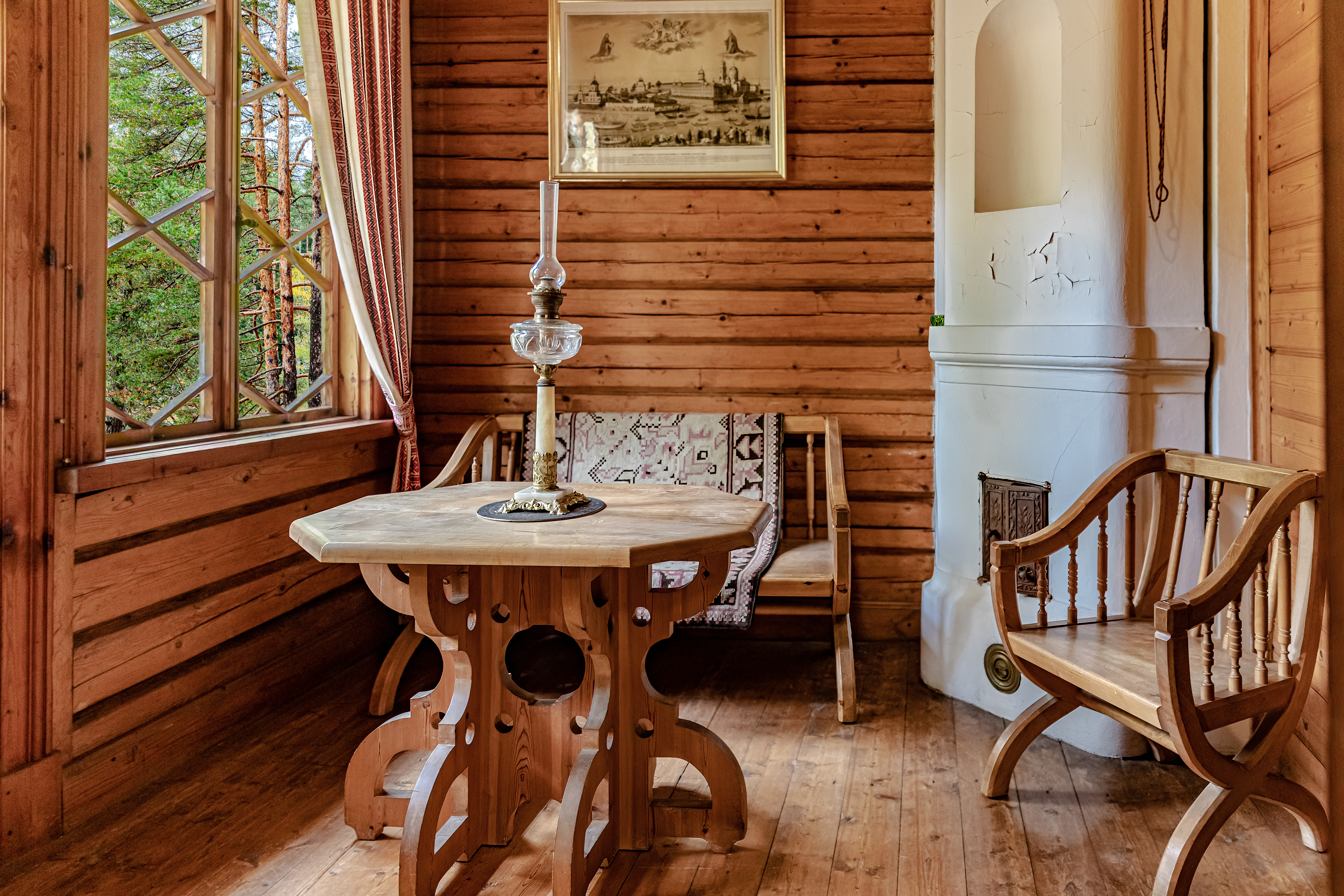
Interior.

During the First World War, the Russian Revolution broke out in 1917, overthrowing the Russian Empire. As a consequence of these events, the Grand Duchy of Finland declared its independence. When Finland became independent in 1917 the Imperial Fishing Lodge was taken over by the Finnish Government, but it was left without maintenance. Pieces of furniture were removed to unknown destinations and the lodge began to deteriorate.

Private individuals saved the lodge for posterity by establishing an association, Kymenlaakson Museoseura, with the intention of turning the lodge into a museum. Their second attempt to get the government's permission for their project met with success and in 1933 the museum was opened. Kymenlaakson Museoseura operated the museum until 1967. During the same year, Langinkoskiseura, continued its work. Until 2018, Langinkoskiseura, acted as museum operator under a contract with the government and under the supervision of the National Board of Antiquities.

In the 1920s the beds of the Emperor and the Empress had been taken away to an unknown place. As a result of many years of detective work by the Finnish Heritage Agency the beds were traced to Kultaranta, the summer residence of the president of Finland.

There they were placed in the guest rooms. In 1956 they were returned to Langinkoski where they can be seen upstairs in the bedroom of the imperial couple."

In October 2024, it was announced that the museum would be closed due to budget cuts by Petteri Orpo's government affecting the Finnish Heritage Agency. The Finnish Heritage Agency received additional funding from the Orpo government, which made it possible to continue museum operations.

Langinkoski is a popular destination. In 2019, there were 12,431 visitors, which is more than at any time in the fishing lodge's recent history. As many as 34 percent of Langinkoski's visitors were foreigners.

== Attractions ==
- Imperial Fishing Lodge. Alexander III and his wife Maria Feodorovna had heard about the rapids, which were rich in salmon. In the summer of 1880, Alexander III went to Langinkoski for the first time to go fishing and he was fascinated by the nature of the region. In 1887 the couple decided to build a fisherman's hut on the banks of the rapids, which was ceremonially opened on July 15, 1889. The two-storey hut, situated on the eastern bank of the river, has retained its original appearance and functioned as a museum.
- The Orthodox Chapel, the oldest building on the territory of the reserve, was created by the monks of the Valaam Monastery 80 years earlier than the imperial hut. The building was open at first, glass windows were installed later.
- The Fishermen's Hut is an authentic fishermen's hut that was built in 1892 for three imperial fishermen by order of Alexander III.
- The "imperial" fishermen's stone. It is known for certain that the Emperor liked to fish with a rod for aspirin, sitting on a large rock on the eastern bank of the rapids. To climb the stone, Alexander III built with his own hands a wooden ladder, which survives to this day.
- Russian trenches of the World War I from 1918. - The fortifications on the eastern bank of the Kymi River, equipped with a system of small arms trenches, machine gun nests and dugouts, were built in 1916. The construction of the fortifications was completed by the end of the war, in 1918. The trenches at Langinkoski are about 1.5 kilometres long and 1.5 metres deep.
- The imperial memorial stone. Two years after the death of Alexander III, the memorial stone was unveiled in Langinkoski in November 1896. There is a plaque on the huge boulder that reads: "Peaceful Alexander III enjoyed quiet here, protected by the local people, from 1888 to 1894. The people of Kymi and Kotka have erected this memorial plaque". During the Civil War in 1918, after which Finland became independent, the memorial stone was shelled, and attempts were made to tear it down. Traces of these events have also been preserved in the reserve as a historical monument.
- An old summer café. The summer coffee pavilion, built back in 1926, sits on a rock at the end of the road Keisarinmajantie, next to the car park.

== See also ==
- Langinkoski Church
