= List of shipwrecks in June 1847 =

The list of shipwrecks in June 1847 includes ships sunk, foundered, wrecked, grounded, or otherwise lost during June 1847.

== 1 June ==
List of shipwrecks: 1 June 1847
Ship	State	Description
Hercules	United Kingdom	The paddle tug was severely damaged by fire in the River Avon downstream of the Holmes, near Bristol, Gloucestershire. Subsequently repaired and returned to service.
Lord Stanley	United Kingdom	The ship was damaged by fire at Aden. Subsequently repaired.

== 2 June ==
List of shipwrecks: 2 June 1847
Ship	State	Description
Spartan	United Kingdom	The brig sank off Cape Henlopen, Delaware, United States. Her crew were rescued. She was on a voyage from Sunderland, County Durham to Philadelphia, Pennsylvania, United States.
Susan	United Kingdom	The ship ran aground near "Dragoe". She was on a voyage from Glasgow, Renfrewshire to Saint Petersburg, Russia. She was refloated and resumed her voyage.
Thompson	(United Kingdom of Great Britain and Ireland) New South Wales	The cutter departed from Sydney for Adelaide, South Australia. No further trace, presumed foundered with the loss of all hands.

== 3 June ==
List of shipwrecks: 3 June 1847
Ship	State	Description
British King	United Kingdom	The full-rigged ship collided with Paola (United Kingdom in the Atlantic Ocean and was abandoned. Her crew were rescued by Paola. British King was on a voyage from Savannah, Georgia, United States to Liverpool, Lancashire. She was subsequently set afire.
Norris Stanley	United States	The ship was beached at the Butt of Lewis, Isle of Lewis, United Kingdom of Great Britain and Ireland. She had become a wreck by 10 June.

== 4 June ==
List of shipwrecks: 4 June 1847
Ship	State	Description
Ætna	United States	The steamboat suffered a boiler explosion and sank in the Ouachita River at Columbia, Louisiana with the loss of more than twenty lives. She was on a voyage from Ouachita to New Orleans, Louisiana.
Birman	United Kingdom	The brig ran aground and was wrecked at Ballyshannon, County Donegal.
Charlotte	United Kingdom	The ship was driven ashore on Cape Sable Island, Nova Scotia, British North America. She was on a voyage from Boston, Massachusetts, United States to the Clyde. She was refloated and resumed her voyage.
Selina	United Kingdom	The ship ran aground at the mouth of the River Avon.

== 5 June ==
List of shipwrecks: 5 June 1847
Ship	State	Description
Adelaide	United States	The ship was driven ashore in the Hudson River. She was on a voyage from Palermo, Sicily to New York.
Nymph	United Kingdom	The ship ran aground on Taylor's Bank, in Liverpool Bay. She was on a voyage from Christianstadt, Sweden to Liverpool, Lancashire. She was refloated the next day and taken in to Liverpool in a leaky condition.

== 6 June ==
List of shipwrecks: 6 June 1847
Ship	State	Description
Junius	France	The ship was driven ashore and wrecked at Westhampton Beach, New York, United States with the loss of a crew member. She was on a voyage from Havre de Grâce, Seine-Inférieure to New York City.

== 7 June ==
List of shipwrecks: 7 June 1847
Ship	State	Description
Edouard et Marie	France	The brig was driven ashore and wrecked at Valparaíso, Chile.
Nestor (Нестор)	Imperial Russian Navy	The brig ran aground and was wrecked on a reef south of Vaindloo in the Gulf of Finland. Her crew were rescued. She was on a voyage from Reval to Kaunissaari.

== 8 June ==
List of shipwrecks: 8 June 1847
Ship	State	Description
Bruce	United Kingdom	The ship was wrecked between the Île Dieu and Île de Noirmoutier, Vendée, France. Her crew were rescued. She was on a voyage from the Clyde to Nantes, Loire-Inférieure, France.
Cassilda	United States	The ship was abandoned and set afire in the Atlantic Ocean. Her crew were rescued.

== 9 June ==
List of shipwrecks: 9 June 1847
Ship	State	Description
Christian and Margaret	United Kingdom	The ship sprang a leak in the North Sea. She was on a voyage from Middlesbrough, Yorkshire to Newburgh, Fife. She put in to Hartlepool, County Durham in a sinking condition.
Mermaid	United Kingdom	The sloop ran aground and was wrecked at Aberystwyth, Cardiganshire. She was on a voyage from Milford Haven, Pembrokeshire to Aberystwyth.

== 10 June ==
List of shipwrecks: 10 June 1847
Ship	State	Description
Catherine Mackellar	(United Kingdom of Great Britain and Ireland) New South Wales	The schooner departed from Newcastle for Sydney. No further trace, presumed foundered with the loss of all hands.
Ceylon	United Kingdom	The ship was driven ashore and wrecked at Moosepeeka Head, Maine, United States. Her crew were rescued. She was on a voyage from New York, United States to Saint John, New Brunswick, British North America. She was later refloated and towed in to Quebec City, Province of Canada, British North America.
Frédérique	France	The ship was driven ashore at Selsey Bill, Sussex. United Kingdom. She was on a voyage from Bordeaux, Gironde to Saint Petersburg, Russia.

== 11 June ==
List of shipwrecks: 11 June 1847
Ship	State	Description
Emerald	United Kingdom	The barque was wrecked on Great Duck Island, Maine, United States. All on board were rescued. She was on a voyage from Boston, Massachusetts, United States to Cornwallis, Nova Scotia, British North America.
Rio Grande	United States	The fishing schooner was lost on Eastern Point. Crew saved.
Virginia	United States	The ship was driven ashore south of Cape Henry, Virginia. She was refloated and taken in to Norfolk, Virginia.

== 12 June ==
List of shipwrecks: 12 June 1847
Ship	State	Description
Andrew White	United Kingdom	The ship was driven ashore near Constantinople, Ottoman Empire. She was on a voyage from Cork to Constantinople. She was later refloated.
Elizabeth Lloyd	United Kingdom	The ship was wrecked on the Carysfort Reef. She was on a voyage from Manzanilla, Trinidad to Quebec City, Province of Canada, British North America.
Heyworth	United Kingdom	The ship was driven ashore at Seraglio Point, Ottoman Empire. She was on a voyage from Dublin to Constantinople. She was later refloated and taken in to Constantinople.
Salus	United Kingdom	The ship was driven ashore near Kronstadt, Russia. She was on a voyage from Liverpool, Lancashire to Narva and Kronstadt, Russia. She was refloated and taken in to Kronstadt.

== 13 June ==
List of shipwrecks: 13 January 1848
Ship	State	Description
St. Jean	France	The ship foundered off Roscoff, Finistère. She was on a voyage from Dinan, Côtes-du-Nord to Libourne, Gironde.

== 14 June ==
List of shipwrecks: 14 June 1847
Ship	State	Description
Anna Maria	United Kingdom	The ship was driven ashore 2 nautical miles (3.7 km) west of Dover, Kent. Her crew were rescued. She was on a voyage from Saint-Valery-sur-Somme, France to Hartlepool, County Durham.
Azorian	United Kingdom	The ship was driven ashore in Grunia Bay, Saint Kitts. She was later refloated and departed on 26 June for Nassau, Bahamas in a leaky condition.
Boadicea	United Kingdom	The ship was driven ashore near Yarmouth, Nova Scotia, British North America. All on board were rescued. She was on a voyage from New York, United States to Quebec City, Province of Canada, British North America. She was consequently condemned.
Bramble	United Kingdom	The ship sprang a leak and sank in Robin Hoods Bay with the loss of three of her crew.
Eugenie	France	The barque was driven ashore at New York, United States. She was refloated on 16 June.
Exporter	United Kingdom	The ship was driven ashore at Huna, Caithness. She was on a voyage from Saint John, New Brunswick, British North America to Leith, Lothian. She was refloated and resumed her voyage.
Southesk	United Kingdom	The brig was driven ashore on Saltholm, Denmark. She was refloated and resumed her voyage.
William and Sarah	United Kingdom	The ship ran aground at Middlesbrough, Yorkshire. She was on a voyage from Exeter, Devon to Middlesbrough. She was later refloated.

== 15 June ==
List of shipwrecks: 15 June 1847
Ship	State	Description
Columbian Packet	United Kingdom	The ship was struck by lightning, capsized and sank in a squall off Cape Henry, Virginia, United States with the loss of four of her twelve crew. She was on a voyage from Baltimore, Maryland, United States to Liverpool, Lancashire.
Eugenie	France	The ship was driven ashore in the Hudson River. She was on a voyage from Havre de Grâce, Seine-Inférieure to New York, United States.
Isabel	United Kingdom	The ship was wrecked on a reef off Castle Island, Bahamas. She was on a voyage from Kingston, Jamaica to Liverpool.
Lord Brougham	United Kingdom	The ship was driven ashore at Mille Vaches, Province of Canada, British North America. She was on a voyage from South Shields, County Durham to Quebec City, Province of Canada.

== 16 June ==
List of shipwrecks: 16 June 1847
Ship	State	Description
Arbutus	United Kingdom	The ship was driven ashore on Gotland, Sweden. She was on a voyage from Saint Petersburg to London. She was refloated.
Fortuna	Bremen	The ship ran aground on the Watts. She was on a voyage from Bremen to Emden, Kingdom of Hanover.
Ocean	United Kingdom	The ship caught fire at Odesa and was scuttled.
Quid Pro Quo	United Kingdom	The ship was wrecked on "Point Lucama". She was on a voyage from Manila, Spanish East Indies to Hong Kong.

== 17 June ==
List of shipwrecks: 18 June 1847
Ship	State	Description
Henry	United Kingdom	The ship ran aground off Helsingør, Denmark. She was on a voyage from Vyborg. Sweden to Hull. She was refloated the next day and taken in to Helsingør.
Jeune Alexis and Celina	France	The ship ran aground and sank near Trapani, Sicily. She was on a voyage from Bordeaux, Gironde to Trieste.
Tryal	United Kingdom	The fishing smack collided with Columbus (United Kingdom and sank in the English Channel off Rye, Sussex. Her crew were rescued.
Tyro	United Kingdom	The ship was driven ashore at Pozzallo, Sicily. She was on a voyage from Liverpool, Lancashire to Venice, Kingdom of Lombardy–Venetia. She was refloated on 26 June and taken in to Malta.

== 18 June ==
List of shipwrecks: 18 June 1847
Ship	State	Description
Russell	United States	The whaler was wrecked on the Porpoise Reef, in the Fiji Islands.
St. Cuthbert	United Kingdom	The schooner struck a sunken rock and was beached in Crinan Bay. Her crew were rescued. She was on a voyage from Liverpool, Lancashire to South Shields, County Durham.

== 19 June ==
List of shipwrecks: 19 June 1847
Ship	State	Description
Commerce	United Kingdom	The ship collided with the Crosskeys Bridge, Sutton Bridge, Lincolnshire and was severely damaged.
Emblem	United Kingdom	The ship collided with the Crosskeys Bridge and was severely damaged.
Ida	United Kingdom	The ship collided with the Crosskeys Bridge and was severely damaged.
Rover	United Kingdom	The schooner ran aground in Placentia Bay. SHe was on a voyage from Prince Edward Island to London.
Wheathill	United Kingdom	The ship collided with the Crosskeys Bridge and was severely damaged.

== 21 June ==
List of shipwrecks: 21 June 1847
Ship	State	Description
Achilles	United Kingdom	The ship ran aground and was damaged on the English Bank. She was refloated with assistance from Express and put back to Pernambuco, Brazil.
Diligence	United Kingdom	The ship ran aground off Margate, Kent. She was on a voyage from Llanelly, Glamorgan to London. She was refloated and resumed her voyage.

== 22 June ==
List of shipwrecks: 22 June 1847
Ship	State	Description
Amity	United Kingdom	The ship ran aground on the Holm Sand, in the North Sea off the coast of Suffolk. She was on a voyage from Cardiff, Glamorgan to Hull, Yorkshire. She was refloated and resumed her voyage.
Jonas	United Kingdom	The ship was driven ashore on Norderney, Kingdom of Hanover. She was on a voyage from Harwich, Essex to Buxtehude.
Margaret Trynor	United Kingdom	The schooner ran aground on the Londoner. She was refloated and taken in to Beverly, Massachusetts, United States.
Ringdove	United Kingdom	The ship ran aground on the Burbo Bank, in Liverpool Bay. She was on a voyage from Port-au-Prince, Haiti to Liverpool, Lancashire.
Triumvirate	United Kingdom	The ship was driven ashore on Saltholm, Denmark. She was on a voyage from Saint Petersburg, Russia to London.

== 23 June ==
List of shipwrecks: 23 June 1847
Ship	State	Description
Friend's Goodwill	United Kingdom	The ship sprang a leak and was beached at Aldeburgh, Suffolk, where she was wrecked. She was on a voyage from Lowestoft to Ipswich.

== 24 June ==
List of shipwrecks: 24 June 1847
Ship	State	Description
Paragon	United Kingdom	The brig foundered in the Atlantic Ocean 100 nautical miles (190 km) north of Barbados. Her eleven crew took to the longboat and sailed to Saint Lucia. Paragon was on a voyage from Berbice, British Guiana to Greenock, Renfrewshire.
Williams	United Kingdom	The ship foundered in the Bay of Biscay. Her crew were rescued. She was on a voyage from Kertch, Russia to London.

== 25 June ==
List of shipwrecks: 25 June 1847
Ship	State	Description
Albion	United Kingdom	The ship capsized and sank at Limerick.

== 26 June ==
List of shipwrecks: 26 June 1847
Ship	State	Description
Columbia	United Kingdom	The ship sprang a leak and was abandoned in the Mediterranean Sea. Her crew were rescued by the brig St. George (Greece). Columbia was on a voyage from Galaţi, Ottoman Empire to Falmouth, Cornwall of Cork.

== 27 June ==
List of shipwrecks: 27 June 1847
Ship	State	Description
Gipsey	United Kingdom	The brig foundered in the Atlantic Ocean. Her crew were rescued by the brig Nautilus (United Kingdom).
Walter Scott	United Kingdom	The ship struck a sunken rock off Point Salines, Grenada. She was on a voyage from London to Grenada and Nassau, Bahamas. She put in to Grenada for repairs.

== 28 June ==
List of shipwrecks: 28 June 1847
Ship	State	Description
Bordelais	France	The paquebot was wrecked at Natal. Her crew were rescued.
Harriet	United Kingdom	The schooner was wrecked in the Bay of Goffe. She was on a voyage from London to Sierra Leone.
Harriet	United Kingdom	The ship ran aground at the mouth of the River Moy. She was on a voyage from the Black Sea to Ballina, County Mayo.
Wester Norland	Sweden	The barque was driven ashore at Blankenese. She was on a voyage from Cette, Hérault, France to Hamburg. She was refloated on 1 July and towed in to Hamburg.

== 29 June ==
List of shipwrecks: 29 June 1847
Ship	State	Description
Agnes	Sweden	The schooner was wrecked on Scharhörn. Her crew were rescued. She was on a voyage from Genoa, Kingdom of Sardinia to Hamburg.
Roberts	United Kingdom	The ship was destroyed by fire at Saugor, India. Her 80 crew were rescued by Fatima (United Kingdom). Roberts was on a voyage from Calcutta, India to China.
Sophie	France	The ship was wrecked on the Penerf Rocks. She was on a voyage from Bordeaux, Gironde to Dunkirk, Nord.

== 30 June ==
List of shipwrecks: 30 June 1847
Ship	State	Description
Emma	United Kingdom	The ship collided with John Jordine (United Kingdom) and foundered in the Green Bank. Her crew were rescued by John Jordine. Emma was on a voyage from Quebec City, Province of Canada, British North America to Liverpool, Lancashire.
Lorena	United States	The ship ran aground in the Mississippi River downstream of New Orleans, Louisiana. She was on a voyage from New Orleans to Saint Petersburg, Russia.

== Unknown date ==
List of shipwrecks: unknown date in June 1847
Ship	State	Description
Affghan	United Kingdom	The brig was wrecked near Bridgeport, Nova Scotia, British North America before 7 June. Her crew were rescued.
Cœur de Lion	United Kingdom	The ship was wrecked on the coast of Newfoundland, British North America. She was on a voyage from Montreal, Province of Canada, British North America to Liverpool, Lancashire.
Fanny, and Huron	United Kingdom	The ships collided in the Atlantic Ocean and both sank. Their crews were rescued. Fanny was on a voyage from the Clyde to Jamaica.
Hellespont	United Kingdom	The ship was abandoned in the Atlantic Ocean. Her crew were rescued by Delia (United Kingdom). Hellespont was on a voyage from New York, United States to Cork.
Irma	France	The brig was lost north of Saint-Louis, Senegal before 3 June.
Julia	United Kingdom	The ship was driven ashore on the coast of Spain before 8 June.
London	United Kingdom	The ship was driven ashore at Shelburne, Nova Scotia, British North America. She was on a voyage from Musquash, New Brunswick, British North America to London.
Lord Auckland	(United Kingdom of Great Britain and Ireland) New Zealand	The ship was driven ashore at Port Curtis, New South Wales before 29 June. She was refloated.
Lorena	United States	The ship ran aground in the Mississippi River. She was on a voyage from New Orleans, Louisiana to Saint Petersburg, Russia.
Marie Françoise	Belgium	The ship was wrecked near Le Conquet, Finistère, France before 5 June.
Mary Ann	(United Kingdom of Great Britain and Ireland) New Zealand	The schooner was wrecked at Tolaga Bay, New Zealand, in late June. She was driven on shore while attempting to leave the bay and broke up. All hands were saved.
Mary B. Oliver	United States	The ship foundered in the Atlantic Ocean 3 nautical miles (5.6 km) south of Cape Henlopen, Delaware. She was on a voyage from Philadelphia, Pennsylvania to Cork.
Naomi	France	The ship was driven ashore near "Guetenen" before 3 June.
Napoleon	(United Kingdom of Great Britain and Ireland) British North America	The ship was abandoned in the Atlantic Ocean before 25 June.
Redbreast	United Kingdom	The ship was crushed by ice and sank in the White Sea before 14 June. Her crew were rescued.
Selina	(United Kingdom of Great Britain and Ireland) New South Wales	The schooner departed from Moreton Bay for Sydney. No further trace, presumed foundered with the loss of all hands.
Sette	Denmark	The schooner was driven ashore at "Trifontane", on the south coast of Sicily. She was refloated on 1 July and taken in to Trapani, Sicily for repairs.
Sylvia	United Kingdom	The barque was wrecked in the Magdalen Islands, Nova Scotia before 16 June.
