= Haapasaari =

Haapasaari (Finnish for aspen island) may refer to:

- Aspö (Finnish: Haapasaari), an island and a village in Korpo, Finland
- Haapasaari (Kotka), a former municipality and an island near Kotka, Finland
