= Ruonala =

Village in Finland

Coordinates: 60°29′N 26°53′E

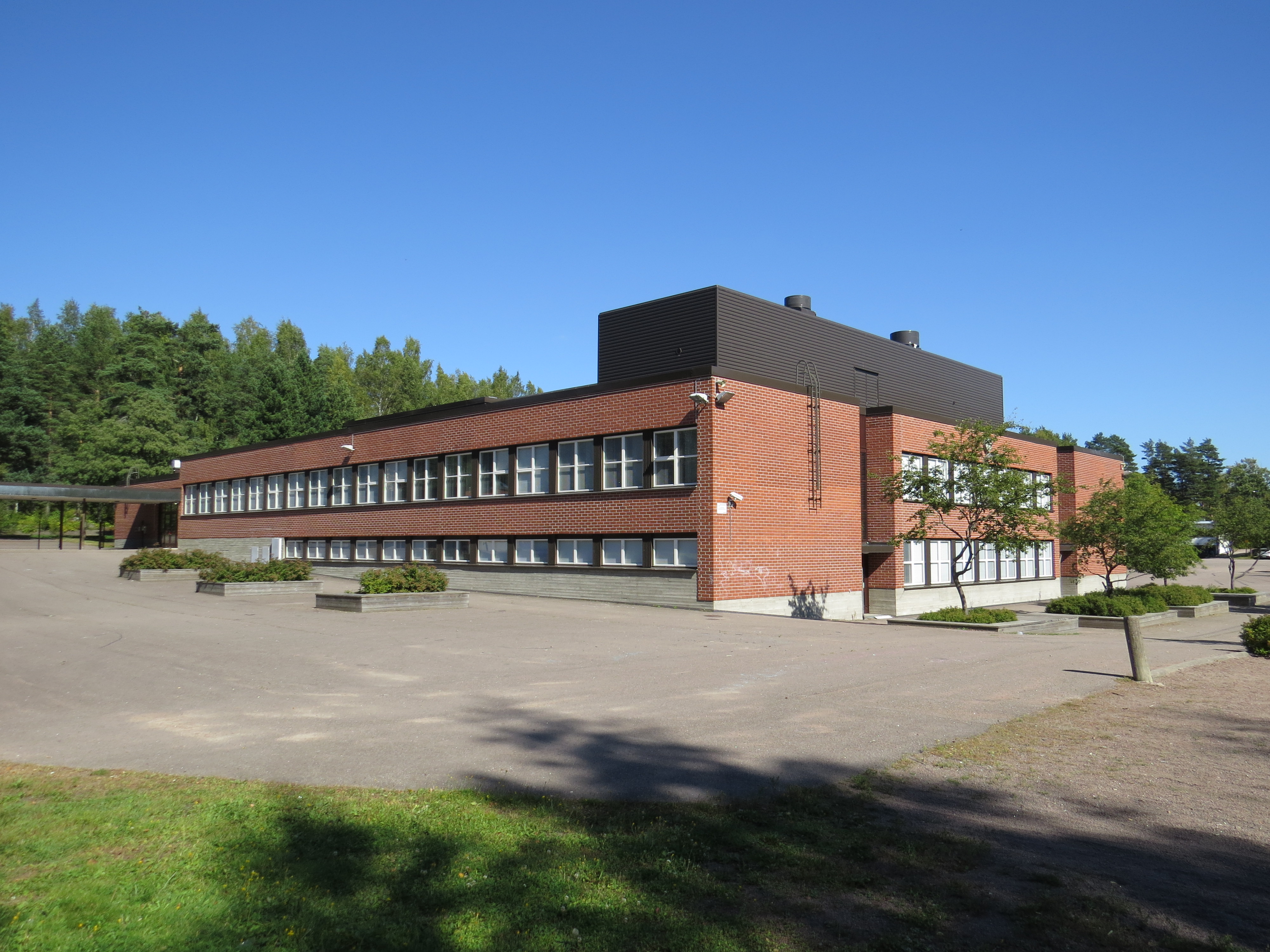
Ruonala Primary School in Kotka, Ruonala district.

Ruonala is a suburb in southern Finland at Kotka. Ruonala is also a family-name in Finland, found mainly near the cities of Kotka and Oulu.
