= Maritime Museum of Finland =

Museum in Kotka, Finland

Coordinates: 60°28′22″N 026°56′42″E

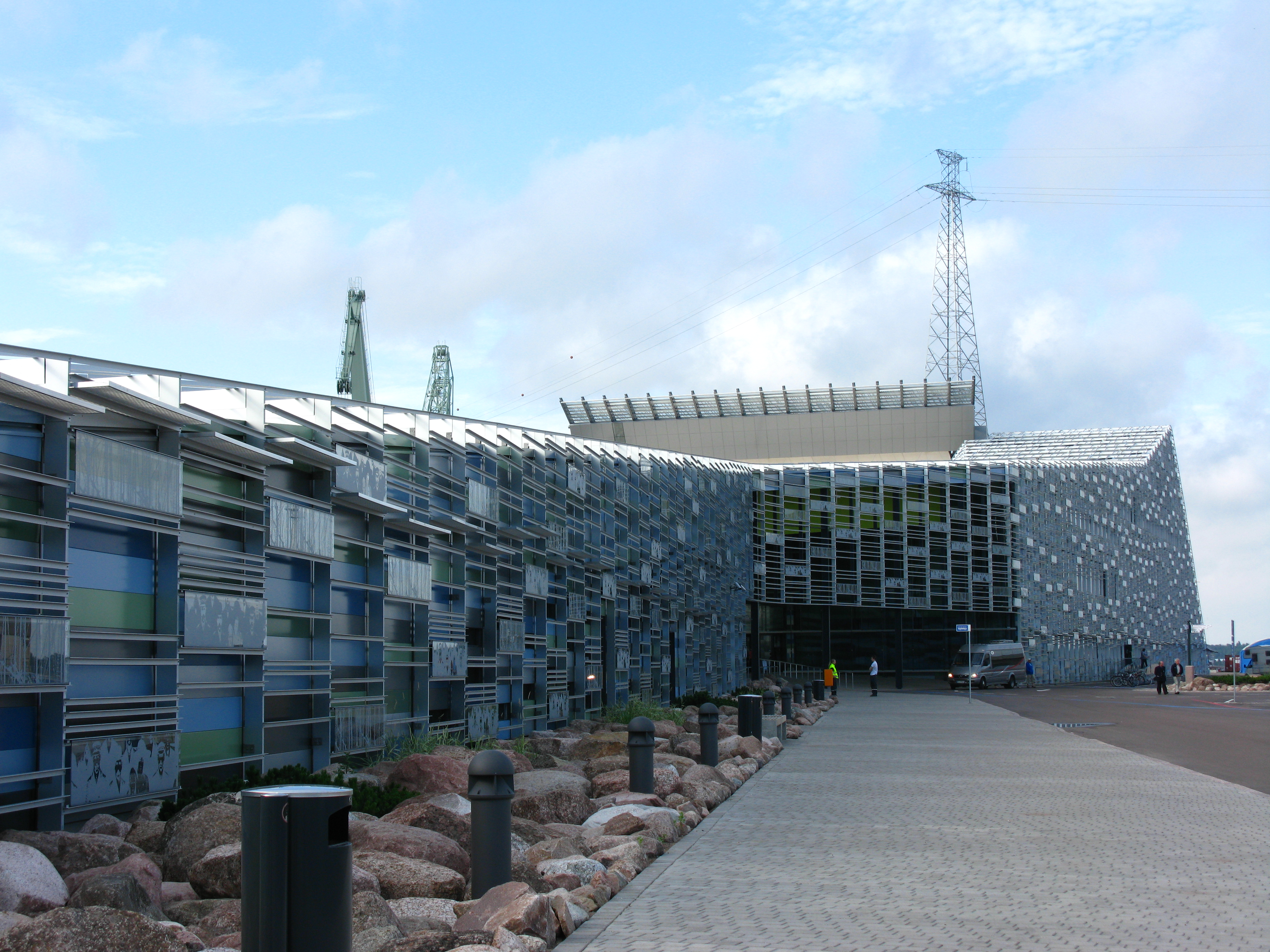
The Maritime Museum has operated in Maritime Centre Vellamo since July 2008. Before that it was located in Helsinki.

The Maritime Museum of Finland (Finnish: Suomen merimuseo, Swedish: Finlands sjöhistoriska museum) is a museum in Kotka, Finland.

Museum is located at Maritime Centre Vellamo and includes Icebreaker Tarmo and Lightship Kemi for visiting.

Museum artefact collection includes over 16,000 items, picture collection of 37,000 photographs, 150 shelf metres of documents, and 8,000 maps and drawings. Photographs are maintained by Finnish Heritage Agency. Collection was opened to public in 1981, but collecting for it began in early 1900s when consul Gösta Sundman and others donated various items. Museum was placed at Vellamo in Kotka after decision made by Ministry of Education and Culture in 2003.

== See also ==
- Kotka Maretarium
