= Haapasaari (Kotka) =

- Former municipality
- Haapasaaren kunta Aspö kommun
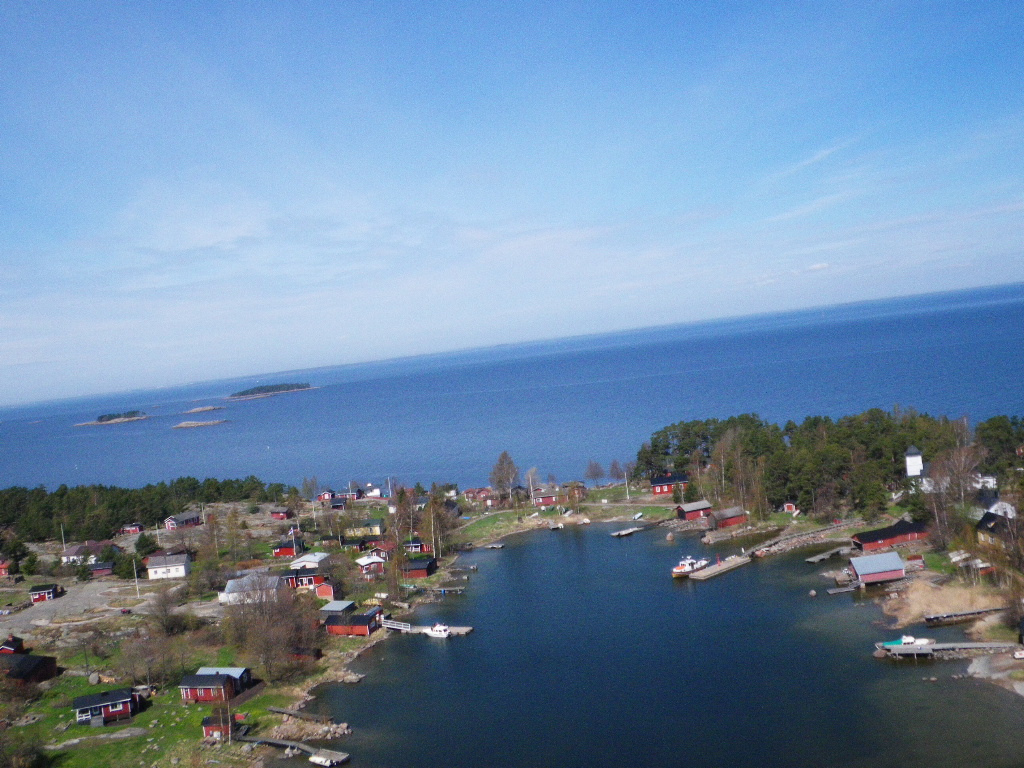
- Aerial view of Haapasaari

- Coat of arms

- Location of Haapasaari in Finland
- Coordinates: 60.2879°N 27.1958°E
- Country: Finland
- Province: Kymi Province
- Region: Kymenlaakso
- Merged into Kotka: 1974

Area
  - Land: 5.0 km^{2} (1.9 sq mi)

Population (1973-12-31)
  - Total: 66

Haapasaari (Finnish: [ˈhɑːpɑˌsɑːri]; Swedish: Aspö) is an island and a former municipality of Finland in the former Kymi Province, now in the Kymenlaakso region. It was consolidated with the town of Kotka in 1974.

It was the only insular municipality in the Gulf of Finland that was not ceded to the Soviet Union. The other insular municipalities were Suursaari, Tytärsaari, Lavansaari and Seiskari.

== Geography ==
Map of the municipality

The Haapasaari municipality consisted entirely of islands with no road connection. As the name of an area, Haapasaari also refers to the former municipality's territory. The largest island was not Haapasaari itself, instead Vanhankylänmaa was the largest.

The island of Haapasaari is divided into two parts by a bay: Länsipää or Vestinpuoli in the west and Uustinpuoli in the east.

=== Climate ===
Haapasaari has a humid continental climate (Dfb) with moderation from the Gulf of Finland.

Climate data for Kotka Haapasaari (1991–2020 normals, extremes 1997– present)
Month	Jan	Feb	Mar	Apr	May	Jun	Jul	Aug	Sep	Oct	Nov	Dec	Year
Record high °C (°F)	7.7 (45.9)	5.7 (42.3)	8.7 (47.7)	17.7 (63.9)	26.5 (79.7)	29.7 (85.5)	31.3 (88.3)	28.5 (83.3)	24.9 (76.8)	16.4 (61.5)	12.5 (54.5)	8.9 (48.0)	31.3 (88.3)
Mean daily maximum °C (°F)	−1.6 (29.1)	−2.8 (27.0)	0.4 (32.7)	5.5 (41.9)	11.7 (53.1)	16.7 (62.1)	20.4 (68.7)	19.6 (67.3)	14.9 (58.8)	9.2 (48.6)	4.5 (40.1)	1.2 (34.2)	8.3 (46.9)
Daily mean °C (°F)	−3.3 (26.1)	−4.8 (23.4)	−2.1 (28.2)	2.6 (36.7)	8.5 (47.3)	13.8 (56.8)	17.8 (64.0)	17.4 (63.3)	13.1 (55.6)	7.5 (45.5)	2.9 (37.2)	−0.4 (31.3)	6.1 (43.0)
Mean daily minimum °C (°F)	−5.6 (21.9)	−7.5 (18.5)	−4.9 (23.2)	0.5 (32.9)	6.1 (43.0)	11.8 (53.2)	15.9 (60.6)	15.5 (59.9)	11.4 (52.5)	6.1 (43.0)	1.4 (34.5)	−2.3 (27.9)	4.0 (39.2)
Record low °C (°F)	−25.7 (−14.3)	−26.5 (−15.7)	−22.9 (−9.2)	−12.1 (10.2)	−1.4 (29.5)	3.9 (39.0)	9.1 (48.4)	8.7 (47.7)	3.2 (37.8)	−3.2 (26.2)	−11.9 (10.6)	−24.2 (−11.6)	−26.5 (−15.7)
Source 1: FMI climatological normals for Finland 1991-2020
Source 2: Record highs and lows 1997- present

== History ==
Haapasaari has had some inhabitants since the medieval times, likely since the late 13th century following the Third Swedish Crusade, but a village on the island was first mentioned in 1547. In that year, the island had ten houses. Its initial inhabitants were Swedish. The island was a part of the Pyhtää parish until 1642, when the Kymi parish was separated from it. The ancestors of the current inhabitants originated from nearby Vanhankylänmaa, migrating to Haapasaari in the 18th century or slightly earlier. Vanhankylänmaa was likely inhabited in the medieval times as well, today it is uninhabited.

The first church in Haapasaari was built in 1776, though a chapel can already be seen in maps from 1741. A new church was built in 1858, remaining there to this day. Haapasaari became an independent parish in 1909. Soon afterwards, it became a municipality in 1913. In the beginning of the 20th century, the population of Haapasaari peaked at 348. The island of Rankki, known for its fortress, was transferred to the Haapasaari municipality in 1935. Haapasaari started to decline after the Second World War. The municipality was consolidated with the town of Kotka in 1974.

== Church ==
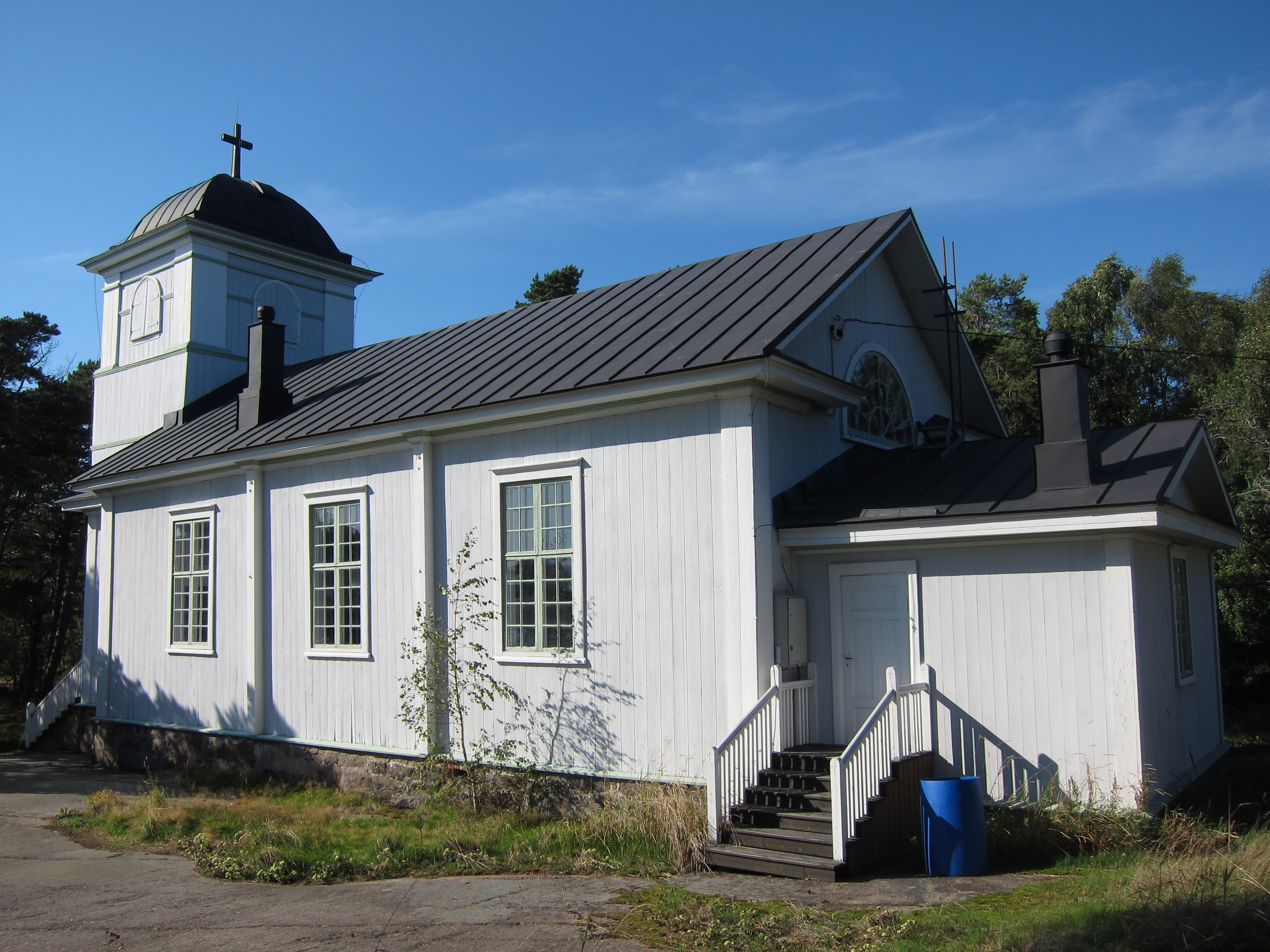
Haapasaari Church.

The current church of Haapasaari was built in 1858. It is Finland's easternmost insular church and has room for 250 people.

== Services ==
=== Shop ===
Haapasaari has Finland's smallest cooperative shop (osuuskauppa).

=== School ===
Haapasaari had a school from 1890 to 1973. At its peak, it had 50 students. The school's storehouse now has a museum showcasing historical life in Haapasaari.

== Tick-borne encephalitis ==
Like many other southern Finnish islands, Haapasaari has a significant population of ticks. Researchers visited Haapasaari's disestablished school in 2011 to collect samples from ticks. The researchers discovered that two out of a hundred sampled ticks carried the tick-borne encephalitis virus, twice as much as in other risk areas of Finland. The ticks carry the more dangerous Siberian variant of the virus.

== See also ==
- Kaunissaari
