= Langinkoski Church =

Church in Kotka, Finland

Coordinates: 60°29′17″N 26°54′12″E

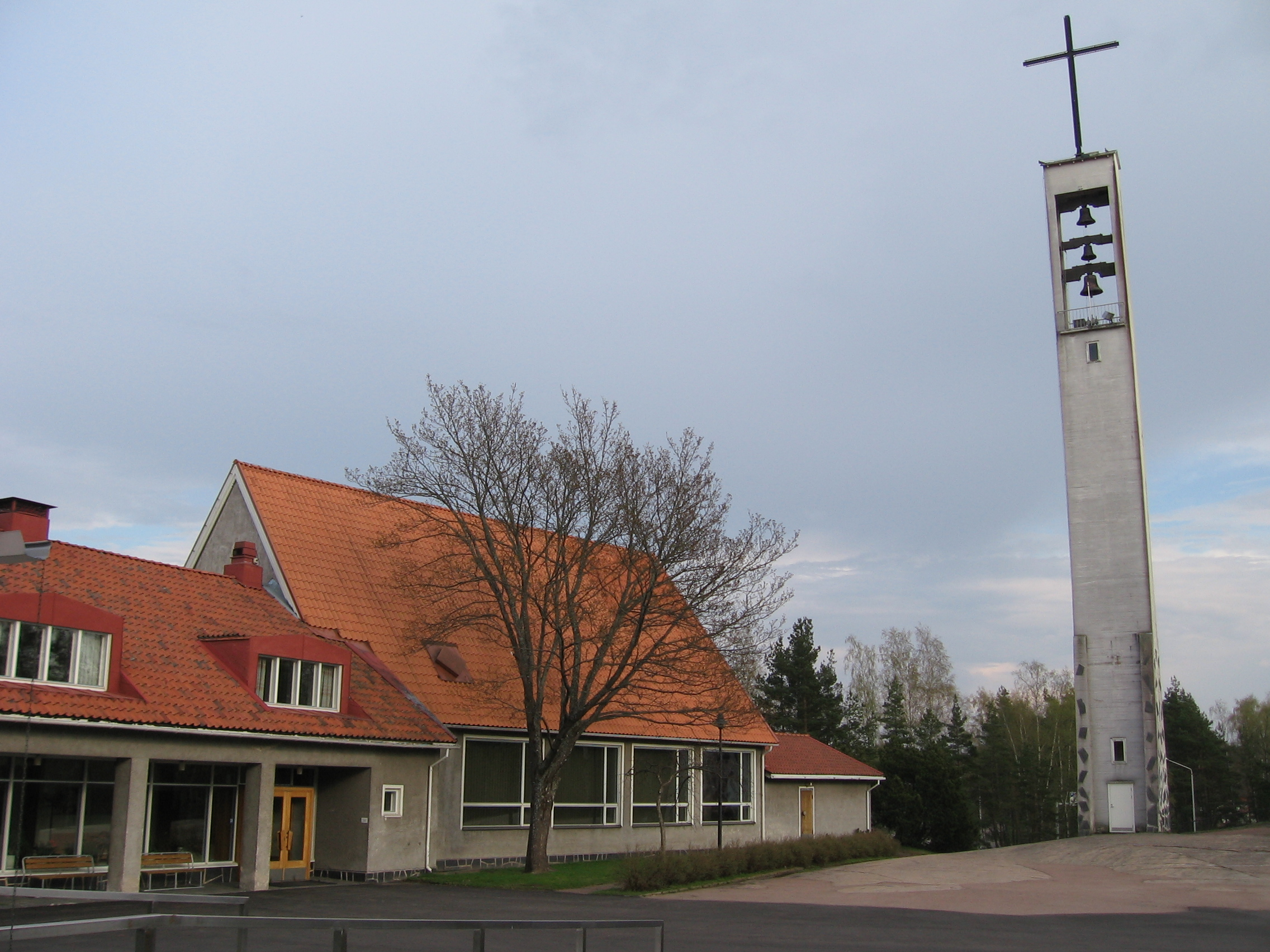
Langinkoski Church and its slender belfry in Kotka, Finland

Langinkoski Church (Finnish: Langinkosken kirkko)) is one of five Kymenlaakso-region Lutheran churches in Finland's Kotka-Kymi parish union. Located in the Metsola district of Kotka, the rectangular church was designed by Anders-Olof Bengts and completed in 1953.

The interior was constructed to resemble a medieval stone church; the hall can accommodate about 300 people and is wheelchair-accessible.

The church features Hilkka Toivola's colourful stained-glass window depicting Jesus rescuing a self-doubting Peter from drowning. The altar, pulpit and seats are of oak; the walls are of red brick. The pipe organ is a 17-stop instrument.

An annex houses the church office. Next to the church is a tall white belfry.
