= St. Nicholas Church, Kotka =

Church in Kotka, Finland

St. Nicholas Church Pyhän Nikolaoksen kirkko S:t Nikolaus kyrka
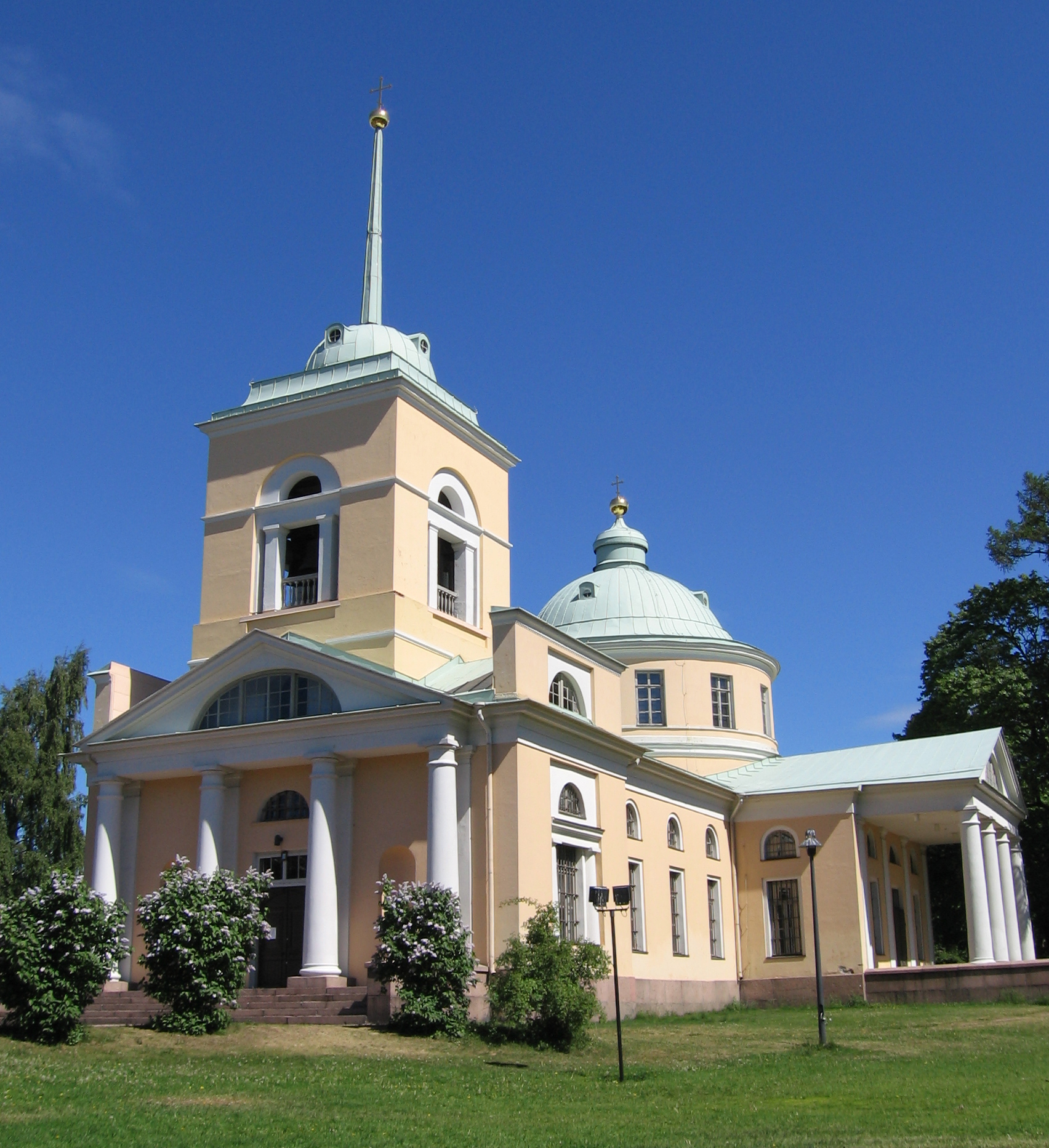
- St. Nicholas Church

Religion
- Affiliation: Kotka Orthodox Church
- Ecclesiastical or organizational status: Church

Location
- Location: Kotkansaari, Kotka, Finland
- Interactive map of St. Nicholas Church; Pyhän Nikolaoksen kirkko S:t Nikolaus kyrka
- Coordinates: 60°27′55.2″N 026°56′52.0″E

Architecture
- Architect: Jakov Perrin
- Style: Neoclassical architecture
- Completed: 1801
- Materials: Stone

The St. Nicholas Church (Finnish: Pyhän Nikolaoksen kirkko; Swedish: S:t Nikolaus kyrka) is the main church of the Kotka Orthodox Church in Kotka, Finland, surrounded by the Isopuisto park The church was built between 1799 and 1801 according to the drawings of architect Jakov Perrin. The church dates back to the time of the active years of the sea fortress of Ruotsinsalmi, when the Russians built the Ruotsinsalmi–Kyminlinna double fortress in the Kymi parish and a fortress town was created on Kotkansaari. The church is the oldest building in present-day Kotka, and it is a notable representative of neoclassicism in Finland.

The church was consecrated in honor of St. Nicholas the Miracle Worker, the Archbishop of Myra. St. Nicholas is one of the most respected saints of the Orthodox Church, he is the patron saint of travelers, sailors and fishermen, among others, and also the patron of the Russian Empire and many other countries and cities.

== History ==
Before the current stone church, there have already been other Orthodox shrines in the Kymi region. The first Orthodox wooden church was located in the northern part of Kotkansaari, next to the barracks. The church is mentioned as consecrated in 1795. In the same year, on the day of St. Nicholas, December 6, 1795, Count Alexander Suvorov is mentioned as having visited the church and even read an epistle text in connection with the service. The stone church of St. Nicholas was eventually built next to the wooden church.

The stone church of the new St. Nicholas was consecrated on October 14, 1801. Due to his illness, Jakov Perrin, who drew up the church's drawings, apparently never got to the site in Ruotsinsalmi to supervise the construction, because Perrin fell ill in St. Petersburg and died on May 23, 1800. In his place, the architect Miller, who worked in the Admiralty, also had to travel to the Ruotsinsalmi Fortress. In addition, Miller designed the iconostasis of the church.

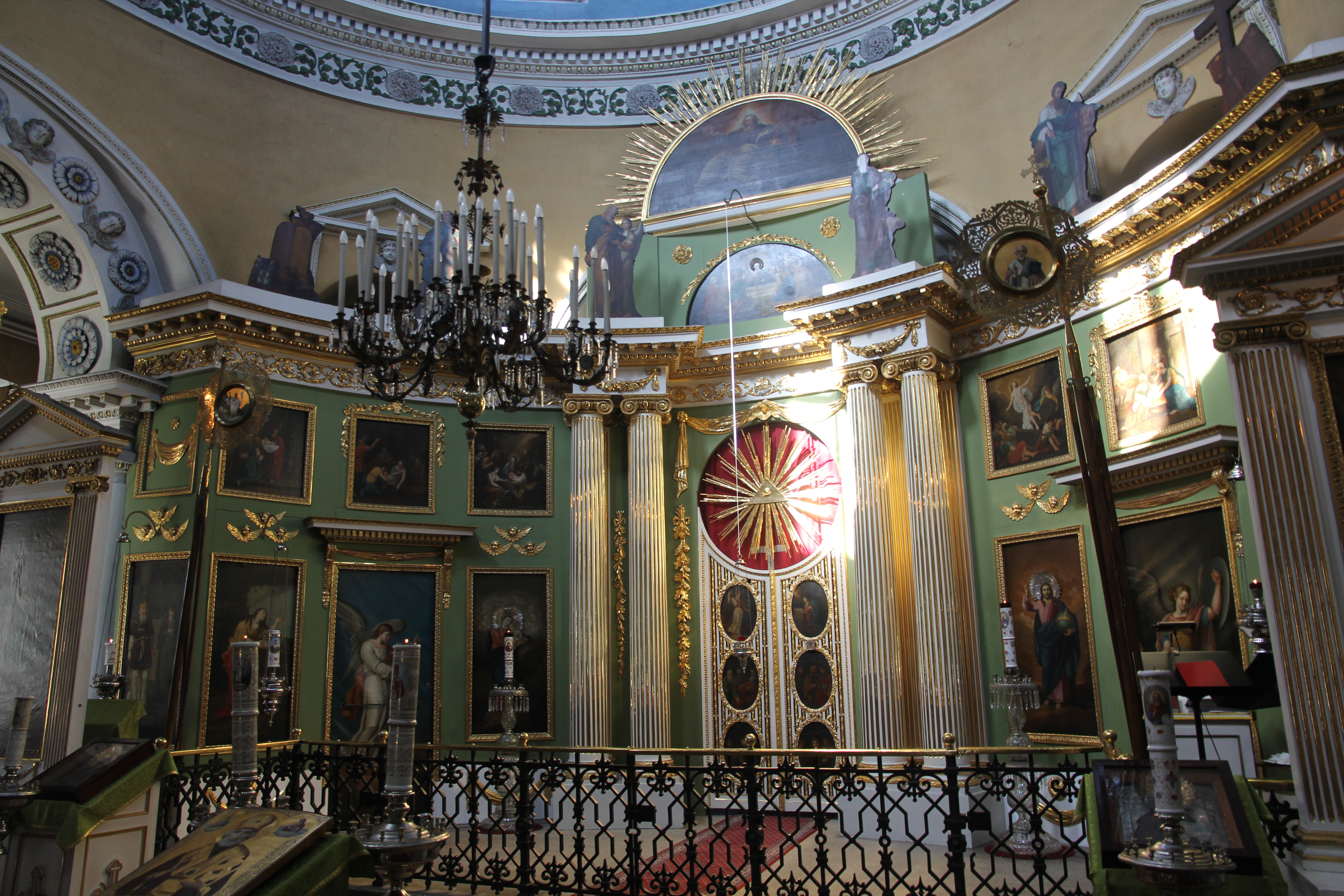
The altar and iconostasis of the church

== Old cemetery ==
Next to the church was a cemetery, a small part of which has been preserved with its monuments. Well-known officers of the Ruotsinsalmi Fortress, such as Deputy Admiral and Knight Nikolai Khrushchev, Commander of the Fortress Ivan Kononovich and Major General and Knight Fedor Timirjazev, among others, are buried in the cemetery.

== Sources ==
=== Further reading ===
- Vesa Alén, Elvi Ikonen, Marita Kykyri, Ari Ryökkynen & Galina Vangonen: Rakennettu ranta – Ruotsinsalmesta Kotkan satamaan; in the chapter Aarteita arkistosta – Ruotsinsalmi kartoissa ja piirustuksissa, by Galina Vangonen. Kotka, Kymenlaakson museo, 2013. (in Finnish)
