= Maretarium =

Aquarium in Kotka, Finland

Coordinates: 60°27′36″N 026°57′00″E

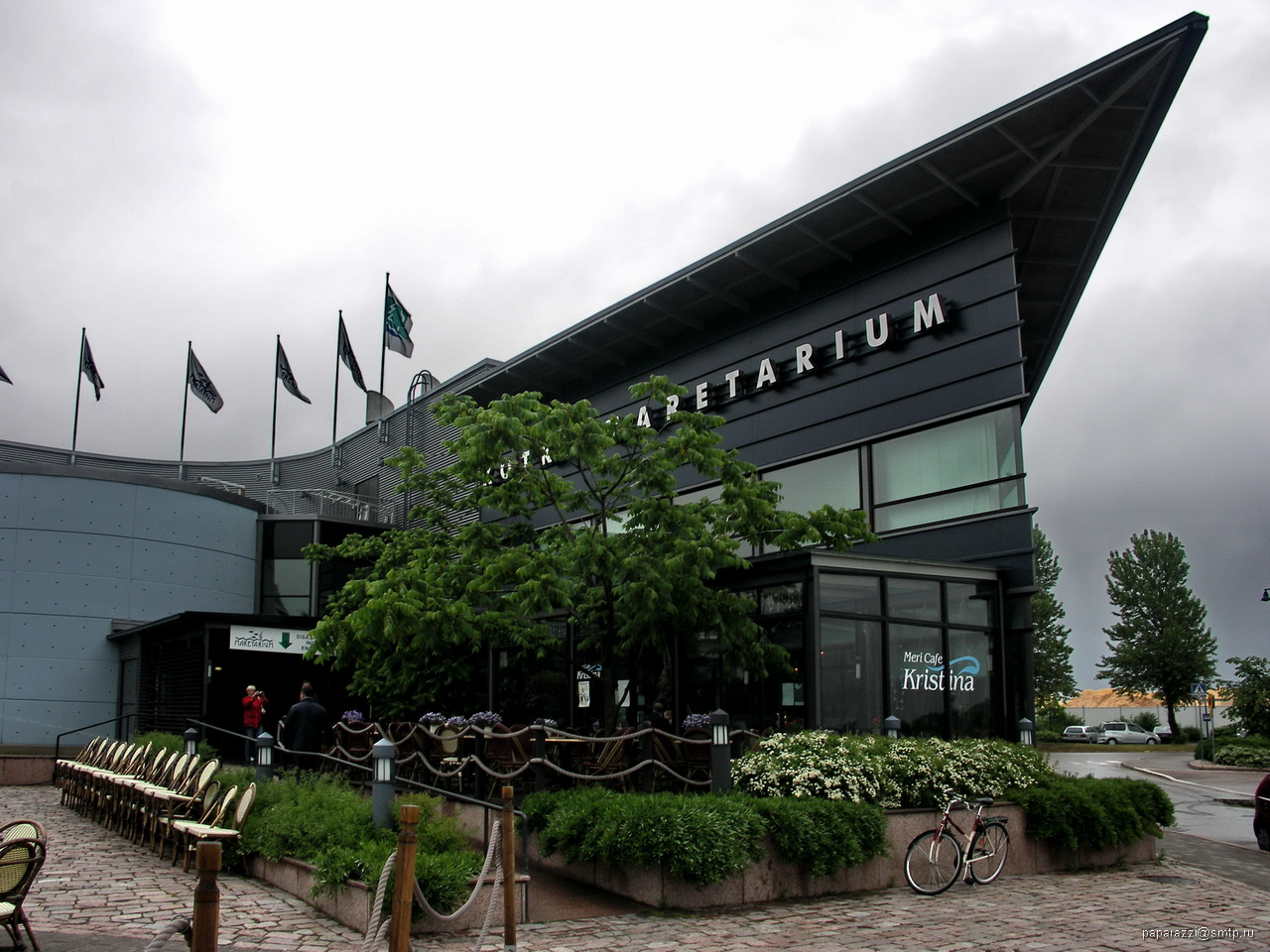
Exterior of the Maretarium

The Maretarium (officially Kotka Maretarium) is a public aquarium opened in Kotka, Finland in 2002, located on the shores of the Sapokanlahti bay. It is focused on the presentation of Finnish fish species and water bodies. There are about 60 native and permanent fish species from Finland. The Maretarium has a total of 22 themed aquariums, the largest of which is the Baltic Sea Pool. It has four windows, one of which is the high glass wall of the Meriteatteri maritime theater. The cylindrical basin holds about 500,000 liters of water. The Maretarium was created in co-operation between the City of Kotka, the University of Helsinki and the Game and Fisheries Research Institute (Finnish: Riista- ja kalatalouden tutkimuslaitos). In addition to aquariums, there are also facilities for researchers and a nature school. The house also has the Meri Café Kristina coffeehouse and a souvenir store.

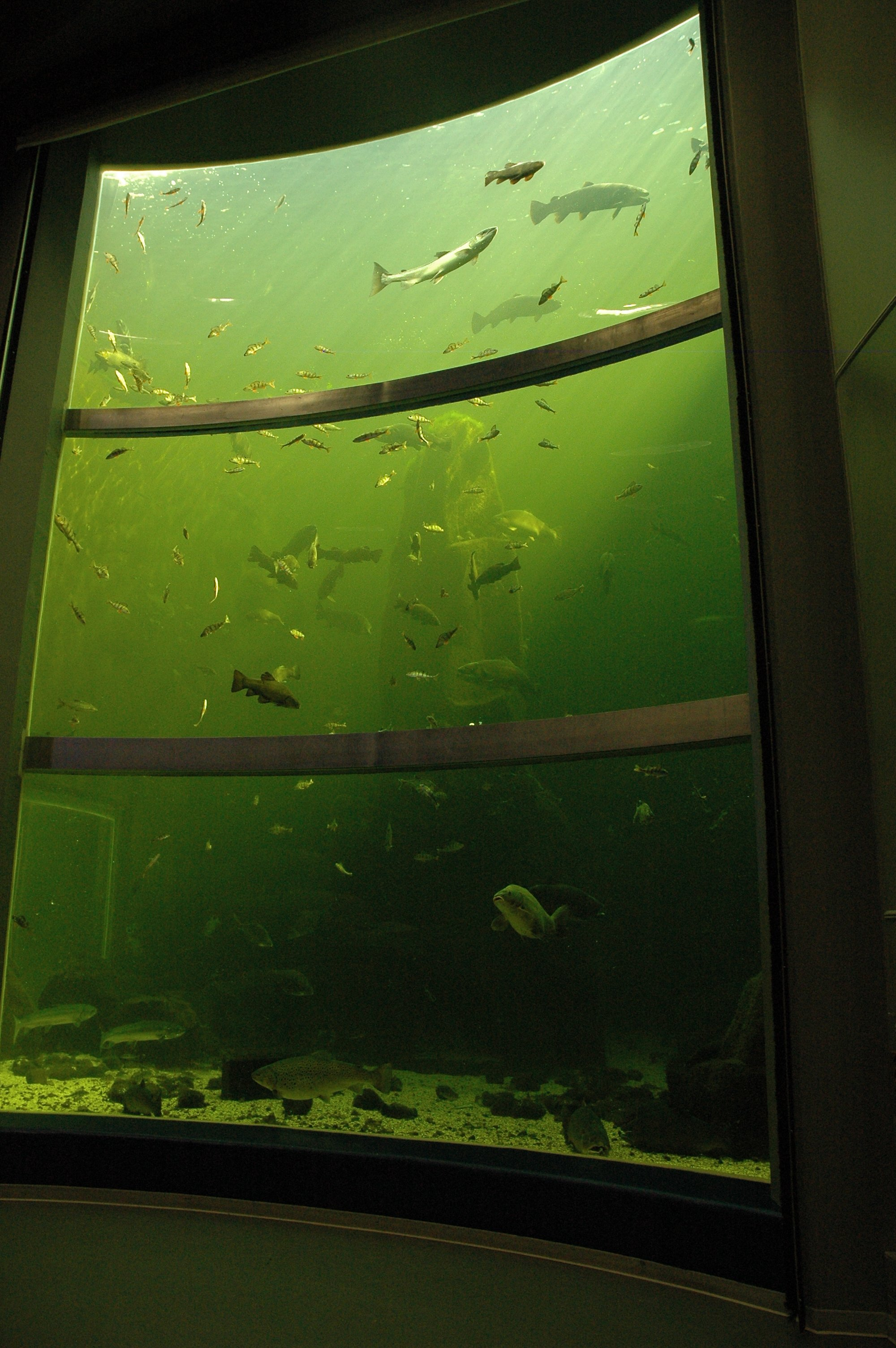
The big aquarium of the Maretarium

== See also ==
- Maritime Museum of Finland
