= Kotka =

- City
- Kotkan kaupunki (Finnish); Kotka stad (Swedish); City of Kotka
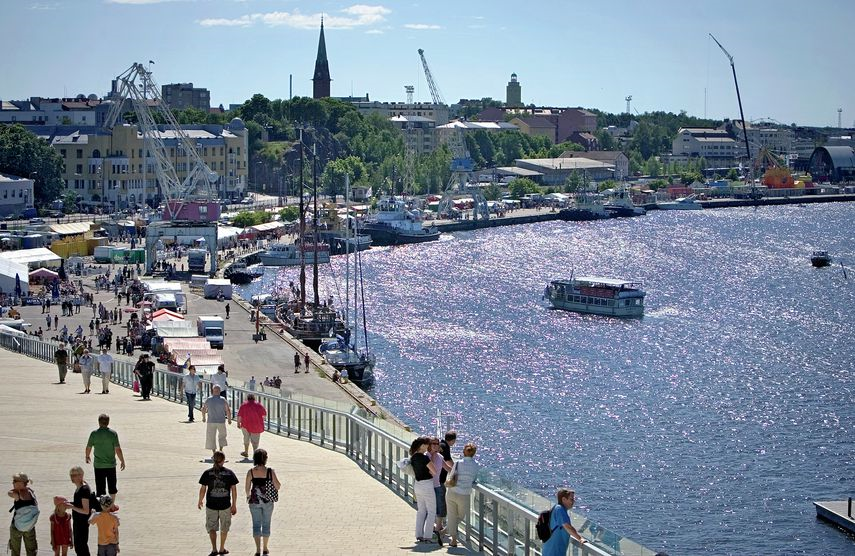
- Kotka in July 2019

- Coat of arms

- Location of Kotka in Finland
- Interactive map of Kotka
- Coordinates: 60°27′50″N 26°56′34″E
- Country: Finland
- Region: Kymenlaakso
- Sub-region: Kotka-Hamina
- Charter: 16 July 1879

Government
  - City manager: Esa Sirviö

Area (2018-01-01)
  - Total: 949.77 km^{2} (366.71 sq mi)
  - Land: 272.13 km^{2} (105.07 sq mi)
  - Water: 678.45 km^{2} (261.95 sq mi)
  - Rank: 239th largest in Finland

Population (2025-12-31)
  - Total: 50,029
  - Rank: 21st largest in Finland
  - Density: 183.84/km^{2} (476.1/sq mi)

Population by native language
  - Finnish: 87.3% (official)
  - Swedish: 0.9%
  - Others: 11.8%

Population by age
  - 0 to 14: 13.1%
  - 15 to 64: 59.2%
  - 65 or older: 27.7%
- Time zone: UTC+02:00 (EET)
  - Summer (DST): UTC+03:00 (EEST)
- Postal code: 48400
- Climate: Dfb
- Website: www.kotka.fi/en/

Kotka (Finnish pronunciation: [ˈkotkɑ]; lit. 'eagle') is a town in Finland, located on the southeastern coast of the country at the mouth of the Kymi River. The population of Kotka is approximately 50,000, while the sub-region has a population of approximately 79,000. It is the 21st most populous municipality in Finland, and the 16th most populous urban area in the country.

Kotka is situated in the southern part of the Kymenlaakso province of Finland. Kotka is a major port and industrial city situated on the coast of the Gulf of Finland. Kotka is a culturally diverse city with a variety of schools. It was previously a part of the former Kymi parish. Kymi, Haapasaari island, and Karhula, which was once a separate market town, were later incorporated into Kotka. Kotka's neighboring municipalities are Hamina, Kouvola, and Pyhtää. Kotka is situated in the Kotka-Hamina subdivision and, along with Kouvola, is one of the main centres of the Kymenlaakso region.

The city centre of Kotka is located on an island in the sea called Kotkansaari ("Island of Kotka"). The main road in Kotka is the Finnish national road 7 (E18), which runs west through Porvoo to Helsinki, the capital of Finland, and extends east to St. Petersburg, Russia. The Port of Kotka is a major Finnish seaport serving both Finnish and Russian foreign trade. The municipality is officially unilingually Finnish, with 87% being native Finnish speakers, 1% Swedish, and 10% speaking some other language.

== Heraldry ==
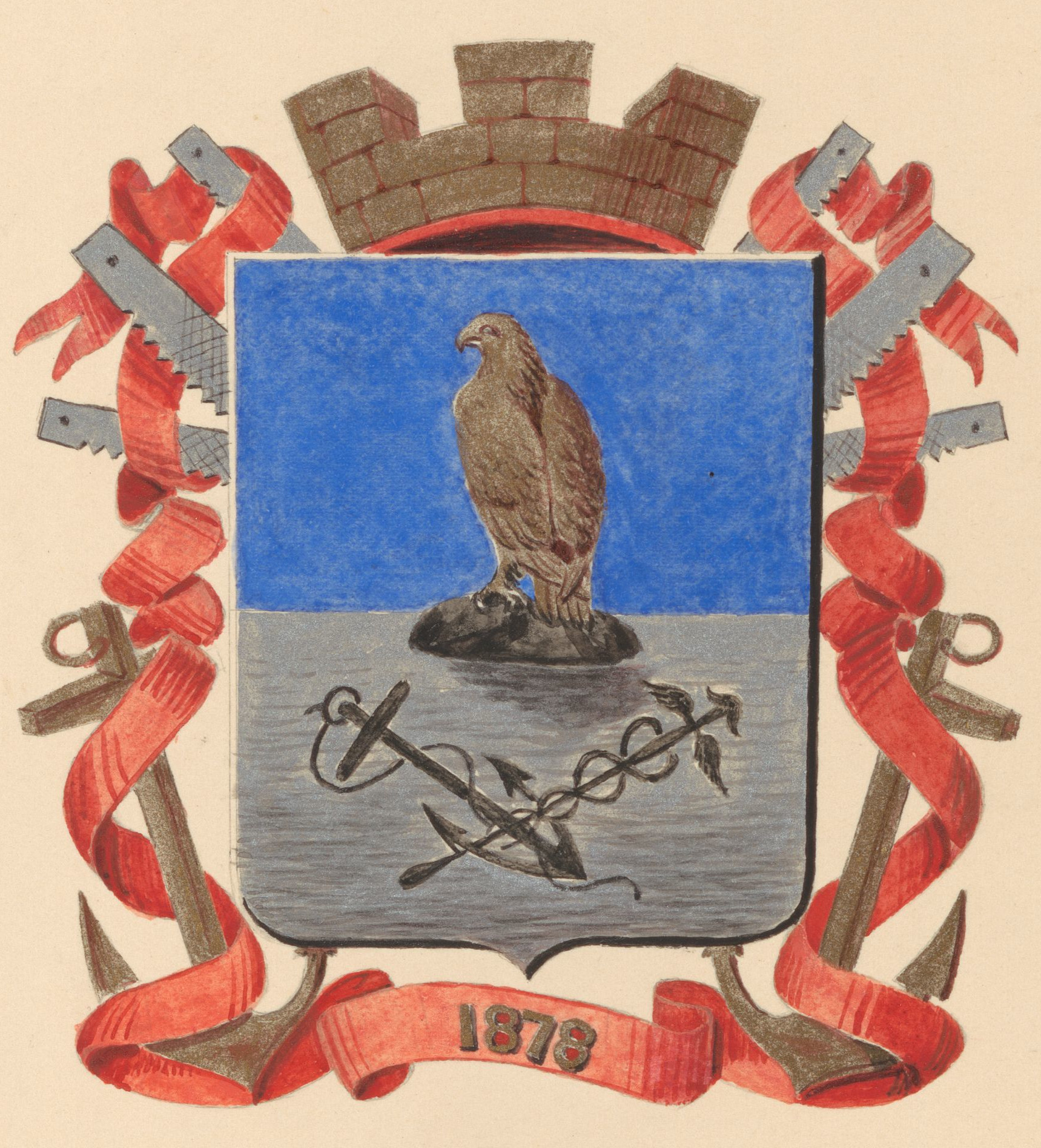
The older coat of arms of Kotka from the 19th century

The description of the older coat of arms read that "the upper field of the split shield is blue, the lower field silver, and in the center of the shield a natural stone with a golden eagle, and in the lower field the anchor and caduceus diagonally crossed, both blue," while the current coat of arms is described as follows: "In a blue field, the wings of a golden natural eagle are raised, standing with a crossed anchor and caduceus, both of which are silver." The first coat of arms of the city of Kotka was confirmed in 1881. However, the Kotka City Council had to renew the old coat of arms in 1954 because it did not meet heraldic requirements. The new coat of arms was designed by Olof Eriksson in 1957, Eriksson kept the new coat of arms as the main emblem of Kotka referring to the name of the city. From the images of the current coat of arms, the anchor reflects the importance of Kotka as a port town and caduceus in trade, industry and maritime traffic.

== History ==
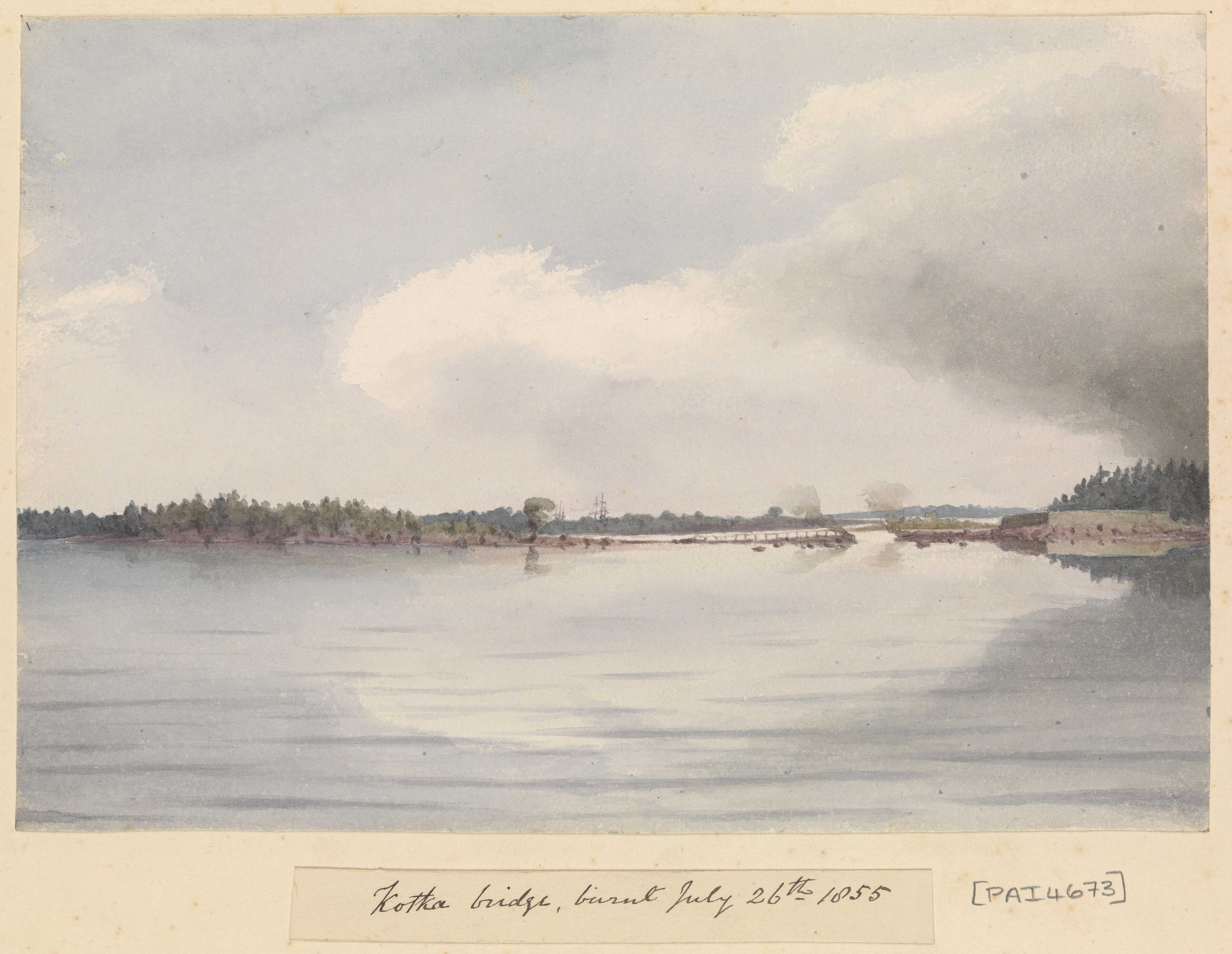
The bridge of Kotka burnt down on 26 July 1855, during the naval warfare of the Gulf of Finland

On 16 April 1878, the Senate of the Grand Duchy of Finland issued a declaration establishing a city on the southern part islands from the old Kymi parish, so in 1879 the islands of Kotkansaari and Hovinsaari were separated from Kymi and the city of Kotka was established.

The Second All-Russian Conference of the Russian Social Democratic Labour Party was held in Kotka, on 21–23 July (3–5 August) 1907.

Historically, Swedish was the official language in the city until 1902. From 1902 until 1906, the city was officially bilingual. Kotka has a Swedish speaking minority (see: Swedish-speaking population of Finland), which in the 1890s accounted for 16% of the city population and 3% in the 1950s. Today around 1% of the city's population are Swedish speakers. There is one school in Kotka where Swedish is the language of instruction, Kotka Svenska Samskola, which was founded in 1885.

Kotka region was one of the first heavily industrialized regions of Finland. Paper and pulp mills remain important employers. In the last decades several factories have undergone restructuring which has led to an increasing unemployment. Since the 1980s the population of Kotka has been slowly decreasing, mostly due to domestic migration to Helsinki region.

== Demographics ==
=== Population ===
The city of Kotka has 50,029 inhabitants, making it the 21st most populous municipality in Finland. The Kotka-Hamina region has a population of 78,573.

Population size 1990–2025
Year	Population
1990	56,634
1995	55,903
2000	54,846
2005	54,838
2010	54,824
2015	54,319
2020	51,668
2025	50,029

=== Languages ===
Population by
mother tongue (2025)
1. Finnish (87.3%)
2. Russian (5.20%)
3. Ukrainian (1.00%)
4. Swedish (0.90%)
5. Estonian (0.70%)
6. English (0.50%)
7. Arabic (0.40%)
8. Other (4.00%)

Kotka is a monolingual Finnish-speaking municipality. The majority of the population, 43,683 persons (87.3%), spoke Finnish as their first language. In addition, the number of Swedish speakers was 466 persons (0.9%) of the population. Foreign languages were spoken by 11.8% of the population. As English and Swedish are compulsory school subjects, functional bilingualism or trilingualism acquired through language studies is not uncommon.

At least 30 different languages are spoken in Kotka. The most common foreign languages are Russian (5.2%), Ukrainian (1.0%), Estonian (0.7%), English (0.5%) and Arabic (0.4%).

=== Immigration ===
Population by country of birth (2025)
Country of birth	Population	%
Finland	44,465	88.9
Soviet Union	1,963	3.9
Russia	405	0.8
Ukraine	347	0.7
Estonia	321	0.6
Thailand	138	0.3
Iraq	131	0.3
Sweden	127	0.3
China	119	0.2
Philippines	117	0.2
Other	1,896	3.8

As of 2024, there were 5,743 persons with a foreign background living in Kotka, or 11% of the population. (Note: Statistics Finland classifies a person as having a "foreign background" if both parents or the only known parent were born abroad.) The number of residents who were born abroad was 5,278, or 11% of the population. The number of persons with foreign citizenship living in Kotka was 3,323. Most foreign-born citizens came from the former Soviet Union, Russia, Estonia, Ukraine, and Iraq.

The relative share of immigrants in Kotka's population is above the national average. Moreover, the city's new residents are increasingly of foreign origin. This will increase the proportion of foreign residents in the coming years.

=== Religion ===
In 2023, the Evangelical Lutheran Church was the largest religious group with 59.9% of the population of Kotka. Other religious groups accounted for 3.0% of the population. 37.2% of the population had no religious affiliation.

== Economy ==
Kotka's three largest employers at the beginning of 2018 were the City of Kotka, the Social and Health Services in Kymenlaakso (Kymsote), and Steveco. The largest livelihoods in 2004 were social services (31.7%) and local industry (21.9%). In 2006, the city's total expenditure was just over EUR 370 million and municipal tax revenue amounted to EUR 141.3 million with an income tax rate of 18.75%. At the end of 2015, the unemployment rate in Kotka was 22.2%, which is one of the highest and largest cities in Finland. In 2005, the unemployment rate in Kotka was 14.4% and in 2006 12.9%. In 2010, the relative number of unemployed in the city started to rise and at the end of 2012 the rate was 17.1%.

== Architecture and culture ==
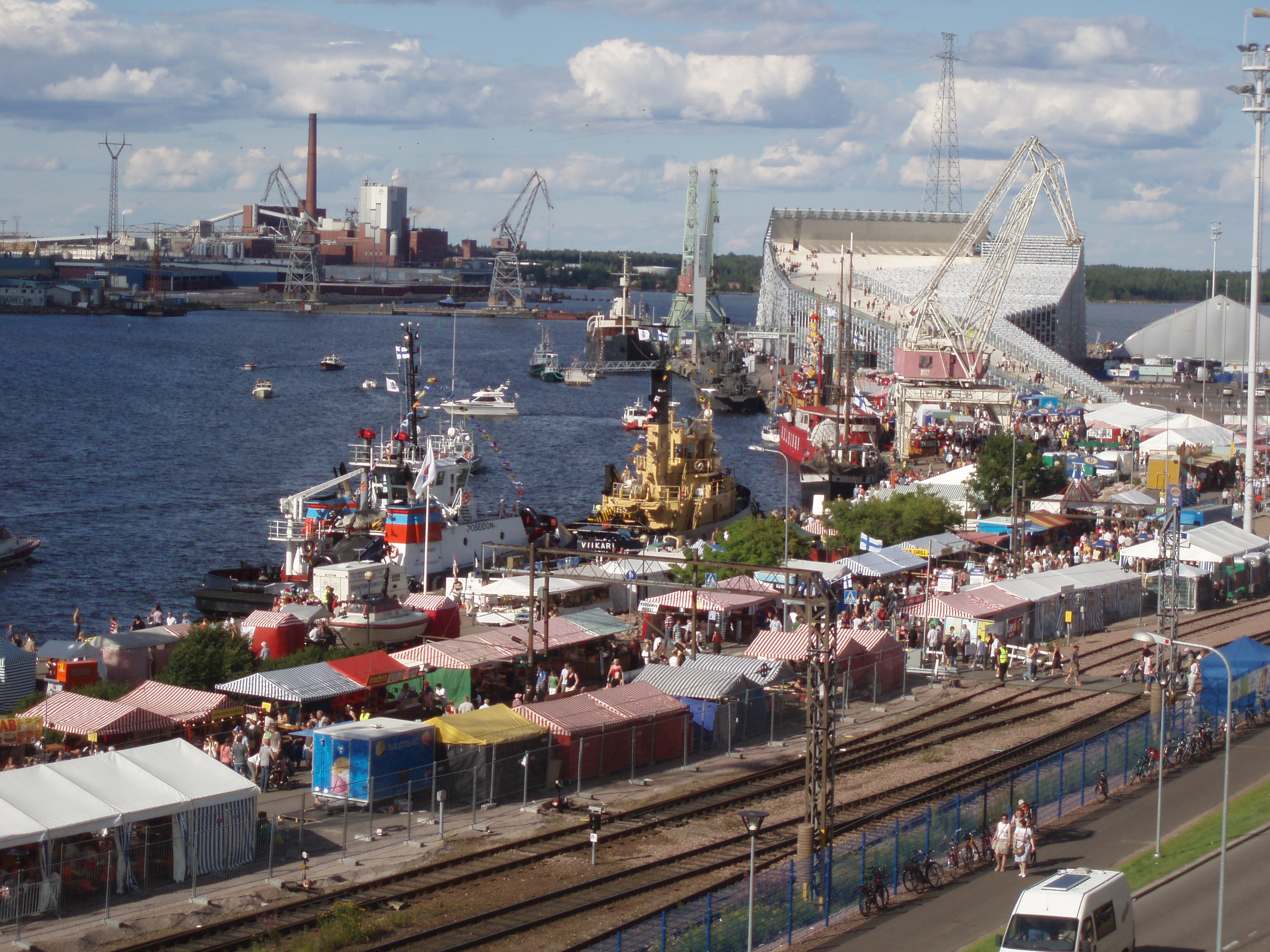
Kotka Maritime Festival (Kotkan meripäivät) in 2008

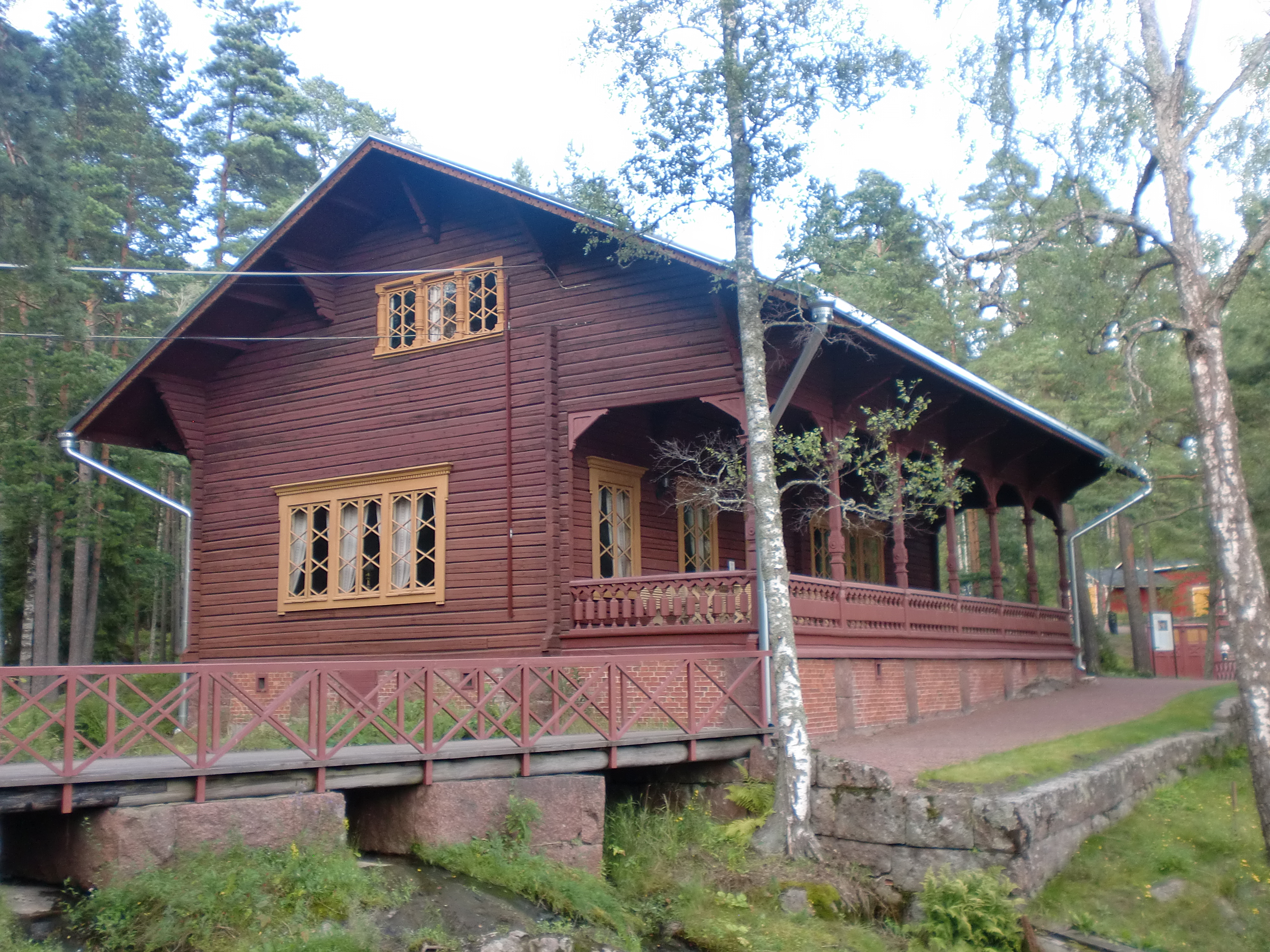
Langinkoski Imperial Fishing Lodge

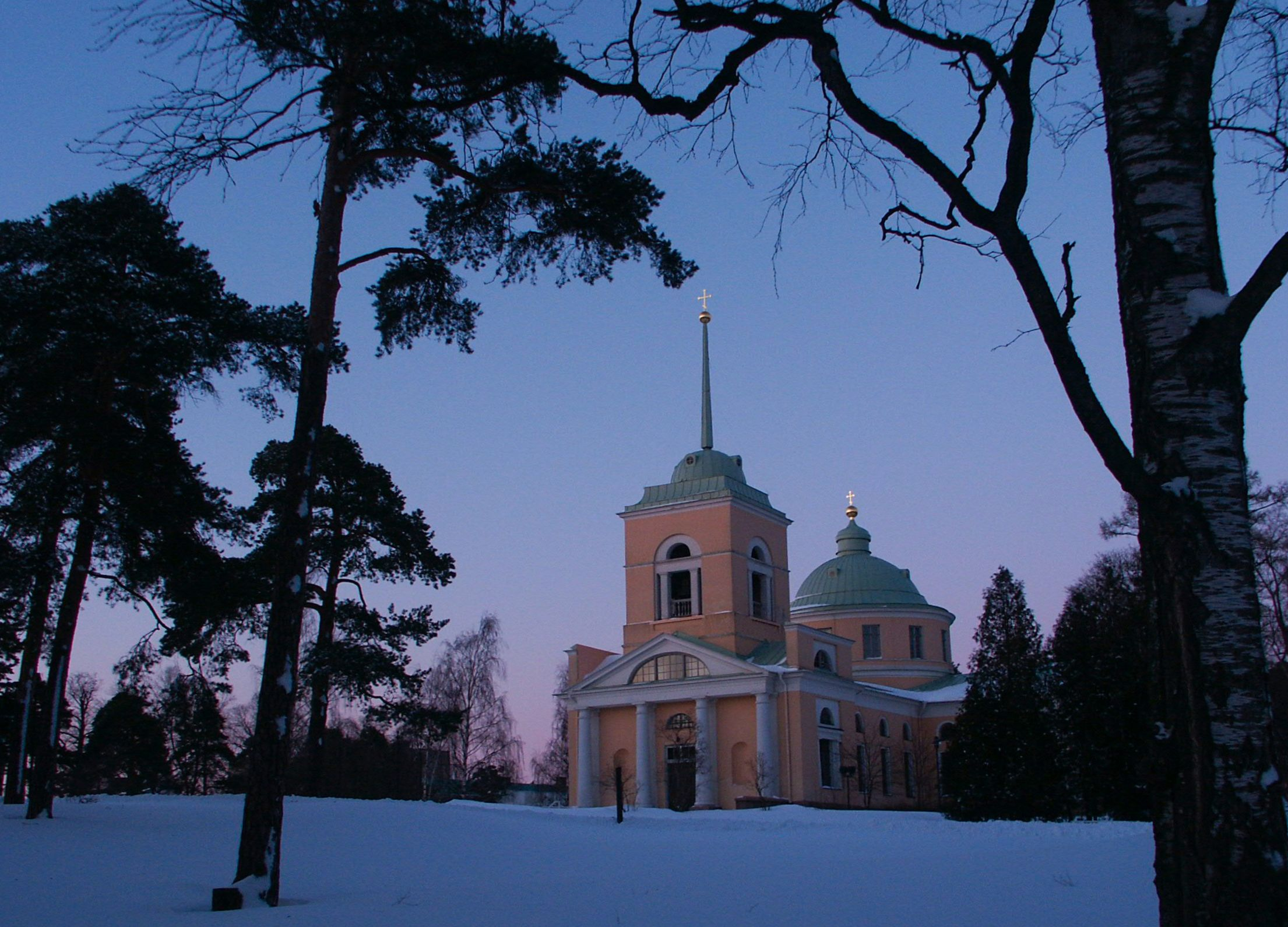
St. Nicholas Church in Kotka

=== Structures ===
Maritime Centre Vellamo is home to the Maritime Museum of Finland, the Museum of Kymenlaakso, the Coast Guard Museum, Information Centre Vellamo and the Kotka Cultural Centre. In addition to this, the building holds classrooms, seminar rooms, a 200-seat auditorium, Restaurant Laakonki with 100 seats, and Museum Shop Plootu.

The Kymenlaakso Museum operates at the Kantasatama Harbour in Kotka, at Maritime Centre Vellamo. The museum building, which has aroused much attention, was designed by the architect Ilmari Lahdelma. The area of operation of the Kymenlaakso museum, which is maintained by the City of Kotka, covers seven municipalities. The museum information services and the work of the regional archaeologist cover the entire region of Kymenlaakso. In building research, the museum serves as a public authority, with duties such as the issuing of opinions in building protection matters. The collections of Kymenlaakso museum have been compiled since the 1920s. Alongside collections of museum items, the museum has an extensive archive of photographs. The collections are located at Metsola in Kotka.

Langinkoski Imperial Fishing Lodge (Langinkosken keisarillinen kalastusmaja) is a museum and fishing lodge in the valley of River Kymijoki. Kymijoki is one of the biggest rivers in Finland with a drainage basin with 11% of the area of Finland. Emperor Alexander III of Russia first visited Langinkoski in 1880 as Crown Prince. During his second visit to Langinkoski, he stated that he wanted a small fishing lodge near rapids. Construction of the house began in the summer of 1888 and was inaugurated the following year. The museum is visited annually by about 14,000 visitors a year.

Maretarium Aquarium opened in 2002, is located on Kotka Island, on the shore of the Gulf of Sapokka. It focuses on the presentation of Finnish fish species and water bodies. There are about 60 native and established fish species from Finland. The Maretarium was created in collaboration between the City of Kotka, the University of Helsinki and the Finnish Game and Fisheries Research Institute. In addition to aquariums, there are also facilities for researchers and the nature school. There is also the Maritime Theater, Meri Café Kristina and a souvenir shop.

The Church of St Nicholas is located in Isopuisto Park in Kotka city centre. Based on designs by Jakov Perrin, the neoclassical church was constructed between 1799–1801, and it is the oldest building in Kotka today. Facade consists of pillars for three entries, the bell tower and a cross dome.

=== Parks ===
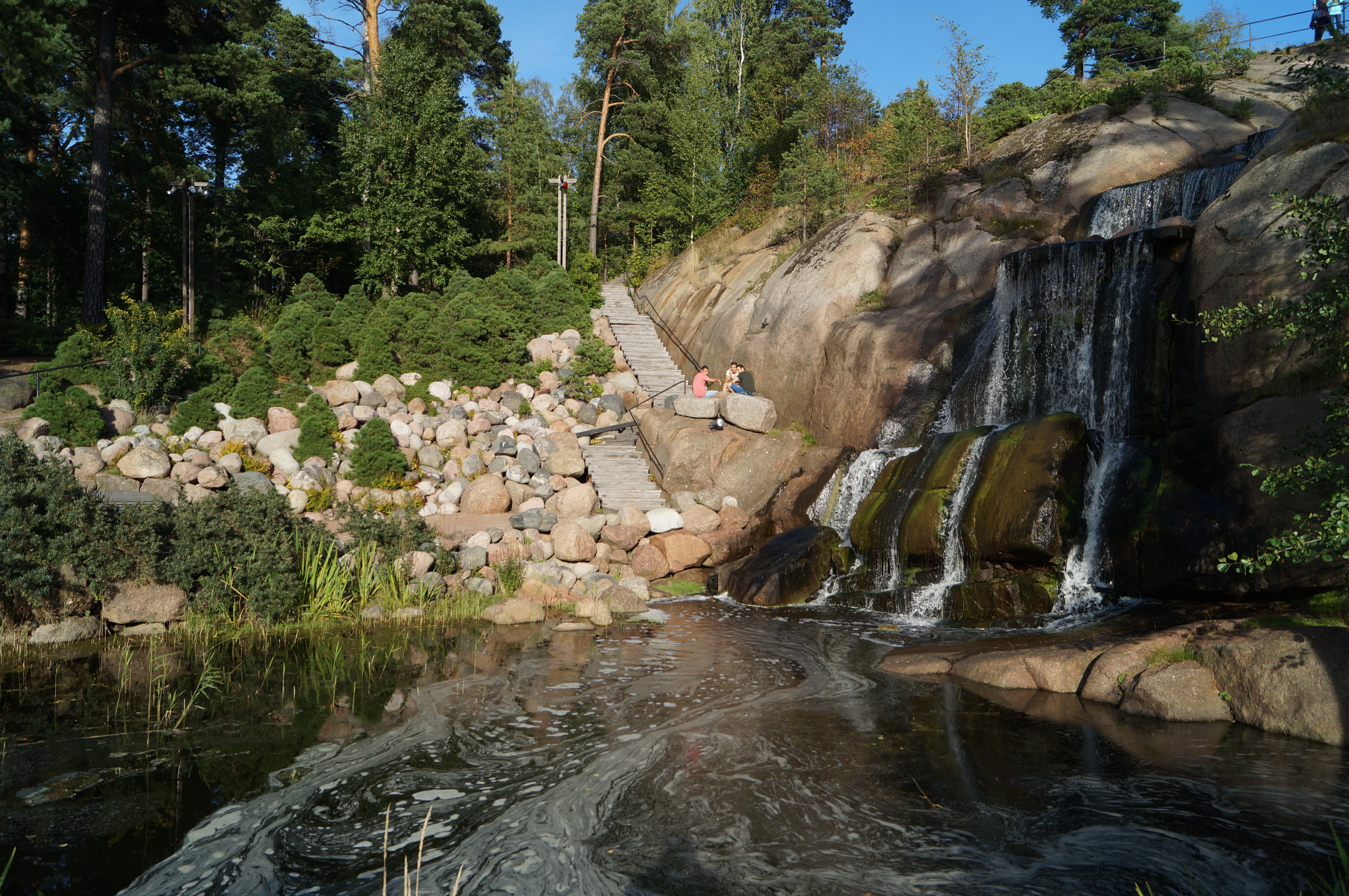
A small waterfall in the Sapokka Watergarden

The numerous maintained parks and green areas make the centre of Kotka can be visited with a walk of about five kilometers, which can reach these park sites: Sapokka Watergarden, Katariina Seaside Park, Sibelius Park, Isopuisto ("Big Park"), Sculpture Promenade, Palotornivuori Park, Redutti-Kotka herb garden, Fuksinpuisto Park and Toivo Pekkanen Park.

- Sapokka Watergarden, awarded with numerous international prizes, is a real green oasis in the middle of Kotka. In addition to the variety of plants, the main elements of this park are water, stone and special lighting.
- Katariina Seaside Park is an extensive outdoor recreation area of more than 20 hectares, which grew up on the site of the oil loading port.
- Sculpture Promenade is Finland's largest outdoor gallery. The new works have been acquired for the sculpture promenade almost every year.

=== Food ===
In the 1980s, Baltic herring, salmon soup, head cheese, turnip potatoes called "lanttujyrkkö", and groat pie ("ryynipiirakka") were named Kotka's traditional parish dishes. Deep-fried doughnuts called "possos" are also considered traditional pastries in Kotka.

== Climate ==
Kotka has an humid continental climate (Köppen: Dfb) with oceanic influences from the Gulf of Finland.

Climate data for Kotka Rankki (1991–2020 temps and precipitation, 1981-2010 sunshine extremes 1959– present)
Month	Jan	Feb	Mar	Apr	May	Jun	Jul	Aug	Sep	Oct	Nov	Dec	Year
Record high °C (°F)	7.1 (44.8)	6.4 (43.5)	12.1 (53.8)	18.6 (65.5)	26.2 (79.2)	29.8 (85.6)	31.7 (89.1)	29.5 (85.1)	24.8 (76.6)	16.1 (61.0)	12.6 (54.7)	8.3 (46.9)	31.7 (89.1)
Mean daily maximum °C (°F)	−1.7 (28.9)	−2.6 (27.3)	0.7 (33.3)	5.9 (42.6)	12.5 (54.5)	17.4 (63.3)	21.0 (69.8)	20.0 (68.0)	15.0 (59.0)	8.7 (47.7)	4.1 (39.4)	1.0 (33.8)	8.5 (47.3)
Daily mean °C (°F)	−3.9 (25.0)	−5.0 (23.0)	−2.1 (28.2)	2.7 (36.9)	8.8 (47.8)	13.9 (57.0)	17.7 (63.9)	17.0 (62.6)	12.5 (54.5)	6.9 (44.4)	2.4 (36.3)	−1.0 (30.2)	5.8 (42.4)
Mean daily minimum °C (°F)	−6.1 (21.0)	−7.5 (18.5)	−4.8 (23.4)	0.2 (32.4)	5.8 (42.4)	11.1 (52.0)	14.9 (58.8)	14.4 (57.9)	10.3 (50.5)	5.0 (41.0)	0.7 (33.3)	−2.9 (26.8)	3.4 (38.1)
Record low °C (°F)	−35.3 (−31.5)	−32.7 (−26.9)	−27.5 (−17.5)	−18.3 (−0.9)	−4.1 (24.6)	1.8 (35.2)	6.6 (43.9)	5.5 (41.9)	−0.7 (30.7)	−8.0 (17.6)	−16.5 (2.3)	−29.8 (−21.6)	−35.3 (−31.5)
Average precipitation mm (inches)	45 (1.8)	40 (1.6)	33 (1.3)	28 (1.1)	35 (1.4)	52 (2.0)	47 (1.9)	59 (2.3)	58 (2.3)	68 (2.7)	60 (2.4)	53 (2.1)	576 (22.7)
Average precipitation days (≥ 1.0 mm)	11	10	8	7	6	8	7	8	9	11	12	12	109
Average relative humidity (%)	89	88	84	80	77	79	79	80	82	84	88	89	83
Mean monthly sunshine hours	36	74	134	200	293	285	317	243	156	87	33	22	1,880
Source 1: FMI climatological normals for Finland 1991-2020
Source 2: Record highs and lows 1959- present

== Sports ==
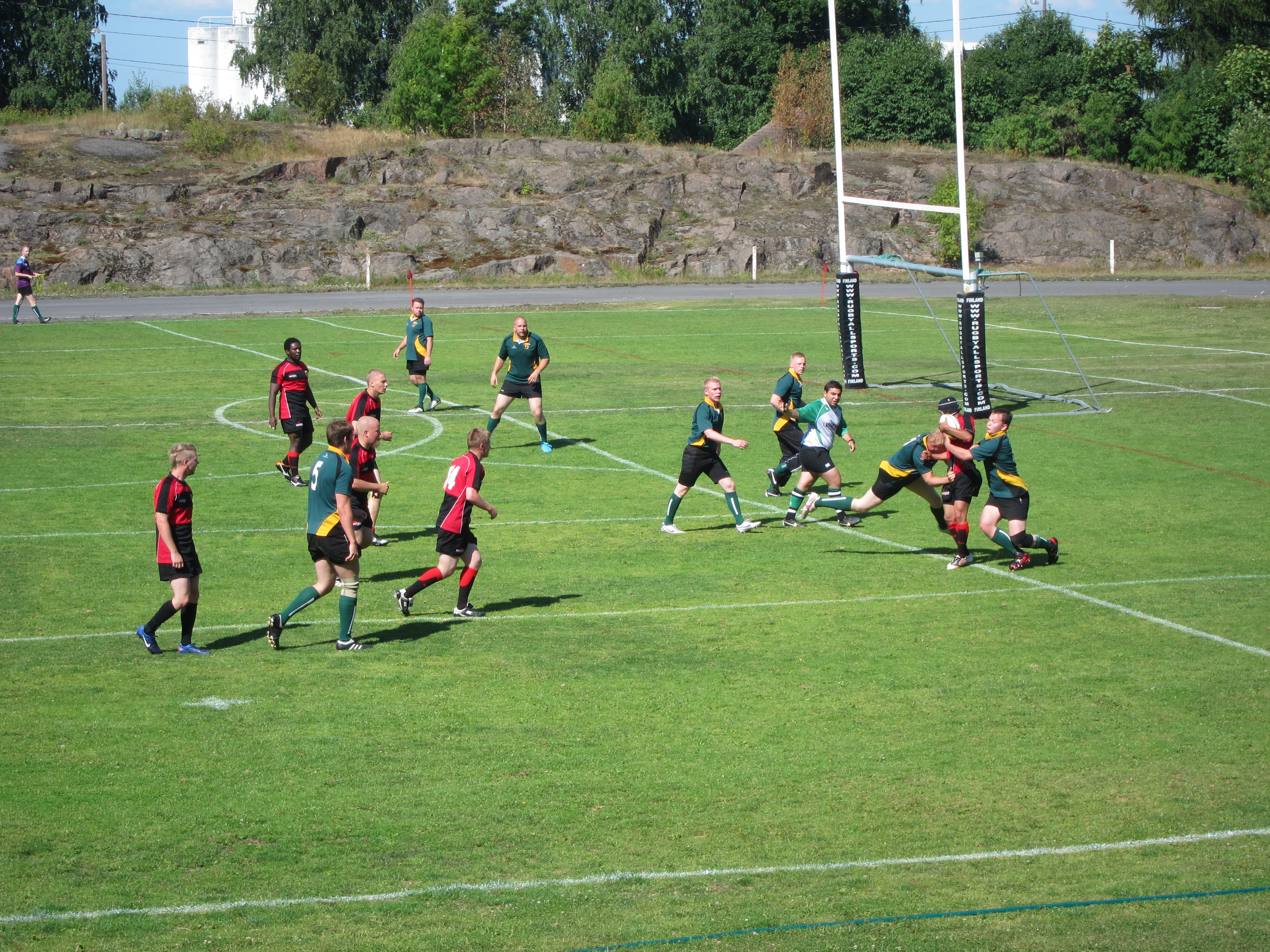
The rugby union team Griffins RFC Kotka playing in the Rugby-7 Tournament in 2013

The local football team is KTP. Founded in 1927, KTP has long, and successful football history. KTP won the Finnish football championship in 1951 and 1952, and Finnish Cup 4 times, in years 1958, 1961, 1967, and 1980. Currently the club plays in the highest Finnish league Veikkausliiga.

Kotka has long been known as one of Finland's basketball cities; KTP-Basket plays in Korisliiga.

There is also rugby club Griffins RFC.

== Local government ==
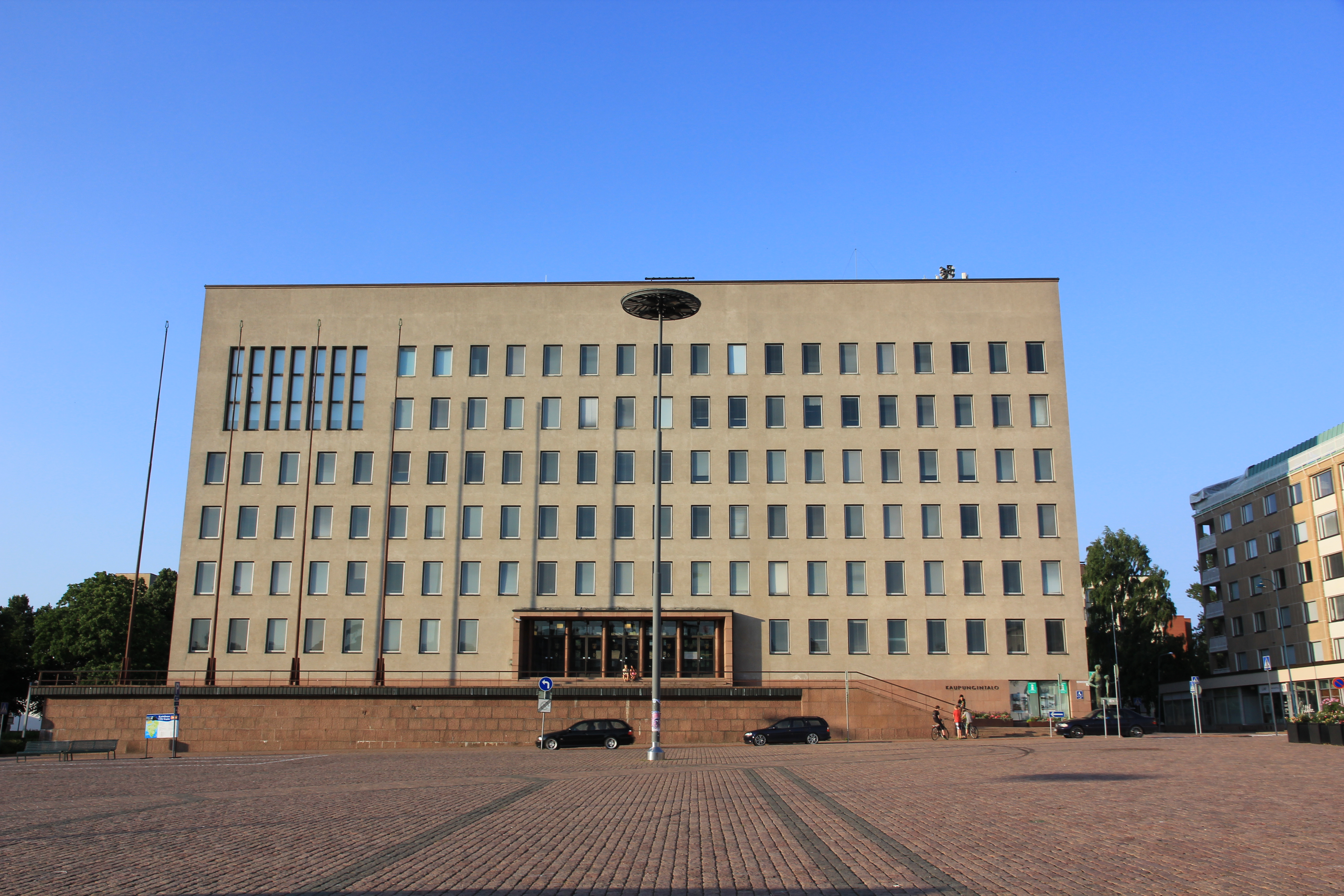
Kotka City Hall

City Council of Kotka
Party	Seats
Social Democratic Party	19
National Coalition Party	13
Left Alliance	7
Finns Party	5
Green League	3
Centre Party	2
Christian Democrats	1
Swedish People's Party	1

== Notable people ==
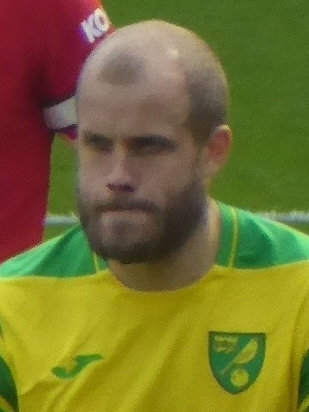
Teemu Pukki

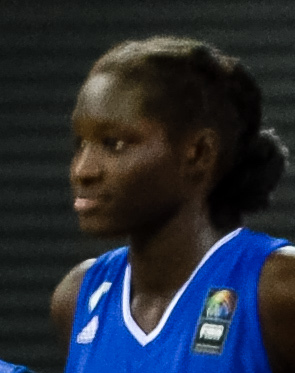
Awak Kuier

- Paavo Aaltonen (1919–1962), gymnast and Olympic champion
- Sari Baldauf (born 1955), businesswoman
- Jyri Häkämies (born 1961), politician
- Pentti Hämäläinen (1929–1984), boxer
- Juha Hirvi (born 1960), sport shooter
- Tapani Kansa (1949–2025), singer
- Veikko Kokkola (1911–1974), politician
- Awak Kuier (born 2001), basketball player
- Rasmus Kupari (born 2000), ice hockey player
- Veikko Lavi (1912–1996), singer, songwriter and author
- Lasse Lehtinen (born 1947), politician
- Irmeli Mäkelä (1942–2026), pop singer
- Toivo Pekkanen (1902–1957), author
- Teemu Pukki (born 1990), professional footballer
- Jaana Saarinen (born 1955), actress
- Niilo Sevänen (born 1979), musician and director of culture in Kotka
- Taisto Sinisalo (1926–2002), communist politician
- Pentti Tiusanen (1949–2018), politician and surgeon
- Arto Tolsa (1945–1989), footballer
- Juha Vainio (1938–1990), lyricist, singer, composer and teacher

== Twin towns — Sister cities ==
Kotka is twinned with:

Landskrona, Sweden (since 1940); Glostrup, Denmark (since 1947); Fredrikstad, Norway (since 1950); Tallinn, Estonia (since 1955); Greifswald, Germany (since 1959)	Gdynia, Poland (since 1961); Lübeck, Germany (since 1969); Kronstadt, Russia (since 1993); Klaipėda, Lithuania (since 1994); Taizhou, Jiangsu, China (since 2001)

== See also ==
- Karhula
- Kaunissaari
- Kouvola–Kotka railway
- Kyminlinna
- Ruonala
- Sunila, Kotka
