= Hilkka Toivola =

Finnish stained glass artist (1909–2002)

Hilkka Terttu Hilda Toivola
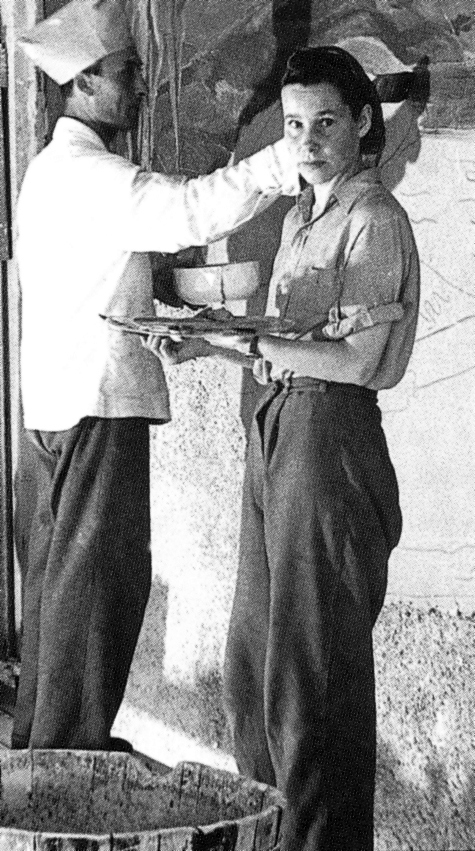
- Hilkka Toivola in 1947
- Born: June 20, 1909; Akaa, Grand Duchy of Finland
- Died: 19 September 2002 (aged 93); Rusko, Finland
- Awards: Pro Finlandia Medal; 1970

Hilkka Terttu Hilda Toivola (20 June 1909 – 19 September 2002) was a Finnish artist who created many stained-glass works, particularly for churches.

== Biography ==
Toivola's parents were train engine driver Herman Frederick Toivola and Hilda Emilia Tammi. Both her mother and her older brother had also studied art in Turku. She studied at the Turku Art Academy (Turun piirustuskoulu) from 1932 to 1935, graduating with honours. Toivola also studied with glass painters Giovanni Toller in Florence (1938) and Pierre Gaudin in Paris (1951). At the Turku Art Academy, she was a drawing instructor (1942–1945, 1964–1969) and later its rector (1969–1973).

Toivola married the painter Otso Karpakka (1914-2005); both were involved in Ryhmä 9, a Turku-based artists' collective that functioned from 1951 to 1959. The couple was unusual in having worked alongside each other as artists for some 60 years, cooperating in the creation of several large frescoes and stained-glass pieces. Nevertheless, they each had separate artistic careers. The Wäinö Aaltonen Museum of Art mounted a large exhibition featuring 600 Toivola and Karpakka works (2006–2007), and published a bilingual Finnish-Swedish book on the artist couple's lives and work.

In 1943, she received a 10,000-mark prize in a mural competition sponsored by Helsinki art dealer Ivar Hörhammer. In 1970, Toivola was awarded the Pro Finlandia Medal.

== See also ==
- Langinkoski Church
