= Hilkka Nenonen =

Finnish diplomat

Hilkka Nenonen is a Finnish diplomat. Since September 2013, she has been the Ambassador of Finland in Dublin.

Nenonen has been employed by the Ministry for Foreign Affairs since 1987 and has been working for Dublin since 2009 in Berlin at the Finnish Nato Delegation as deputy ambassador for military crisis management. Before that, she has had various positions in Moscow, Hamburg and Brussels in the Finnish EU Delegation.

Nenonen's spouse is German-born Rainer Lahmann.
