= Kaunissaari =

Island in Pyhtää, Finland

Coordinates: 60°21′05″N 026°46′00″E

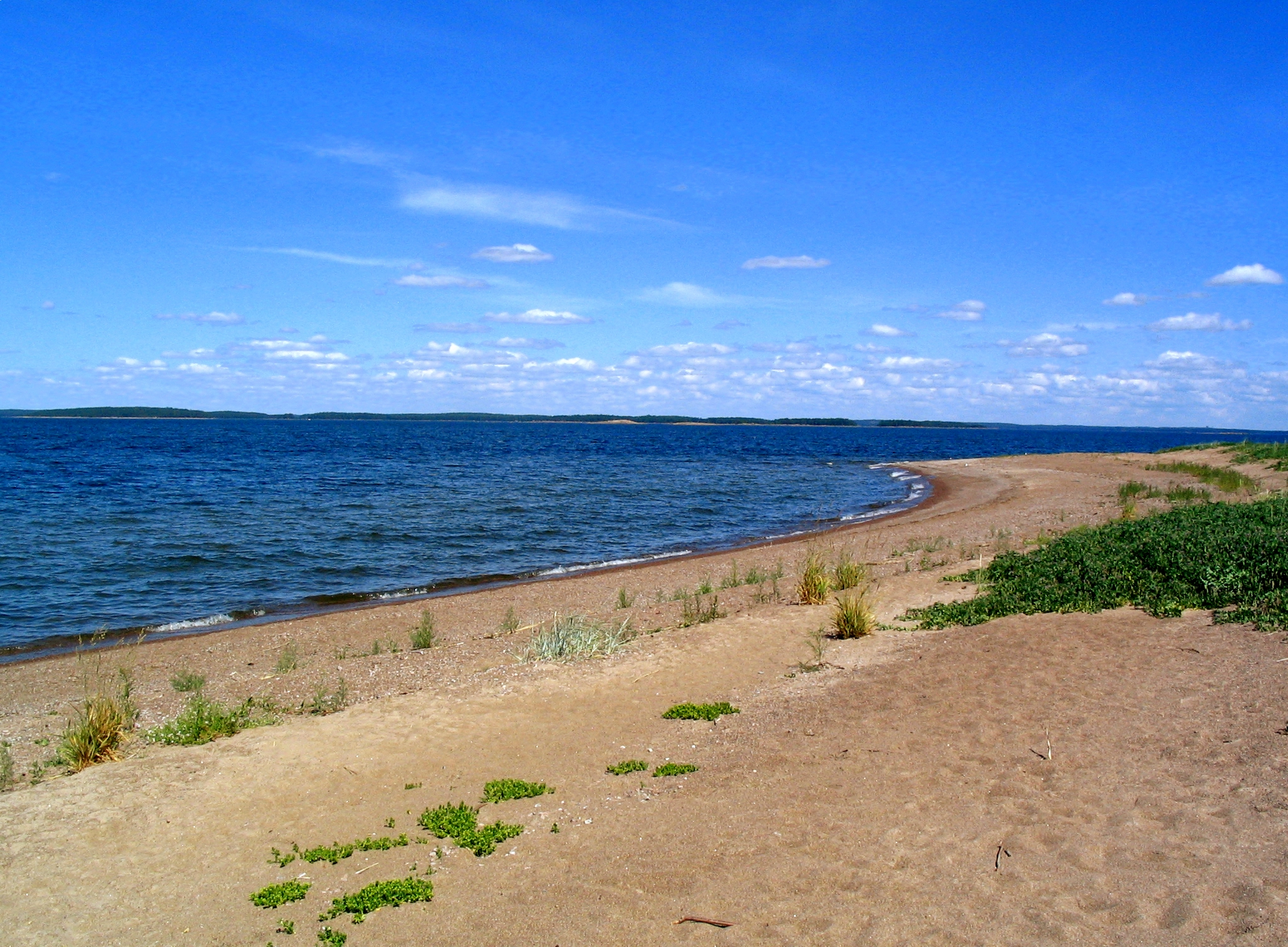
Pohjaspää beach in Kaunissaari

Kaunissaari (Finnish: [ˈkɑu̯nisˌsɑːri]; Swedish: Fagerö), lit. "Beautiful Island", is an island in the Gulf of Finland. It is part of the municipality of Pyhtää in the Kymenlaakso region, Finland, and is 17 kilometres (11 mi) southwest of the city of Kotka.

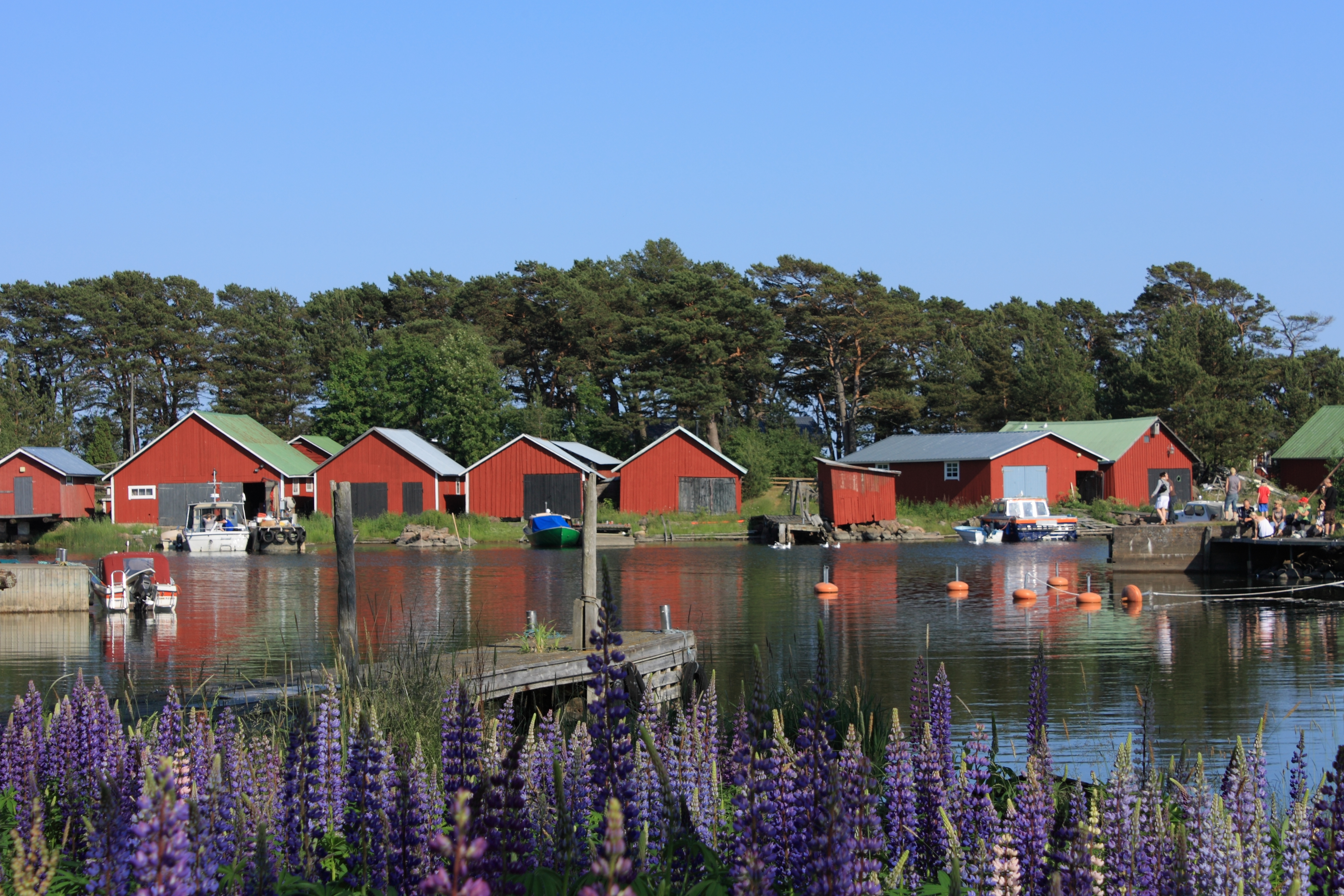
The fishing village of Kaunissaari

Kaunissaari forms part of an esker that juts out into the Gulf of Finland. The soil also has a glacial till on the west side of the ridge formation. The trees are mainly pines; the southern part of the island has culturally influenced, lush vegetation, and much deciduous trees. Sand beaches are located on the north and east side of the island. At the southern end of Kaunissaari is a fishing village, the oldest buildings of which are from the 19th century, although the earliest records of Kaunissaari's settlement date from the 1560s. Of these, the old fishing village and the island's sandy beaches make the island a popular excursion destination, which is why Kaunissaari is the most popular seaside tourist destination in Kymenlaakso and the most versatile archipelago destination in terms of service equipment. Tourists and villagers in Kaunissaari are served by a retail store, restaurant and café opened in the 1980s and an archipelago museum, which presents the local history of the island. Kaunissaari holiday village offers accommodation in log cabins, and the old school building can also be rented for small groups. The current guest marina was built in the early 1990s because the old one became congested due to tourism.

The easiest way to get to Kaunissaari is by ship from Kotka. Boaters can stay at the island's guest marina, close to services.
