= Ahlström family =

Finnish family of industrialists, designers and artists

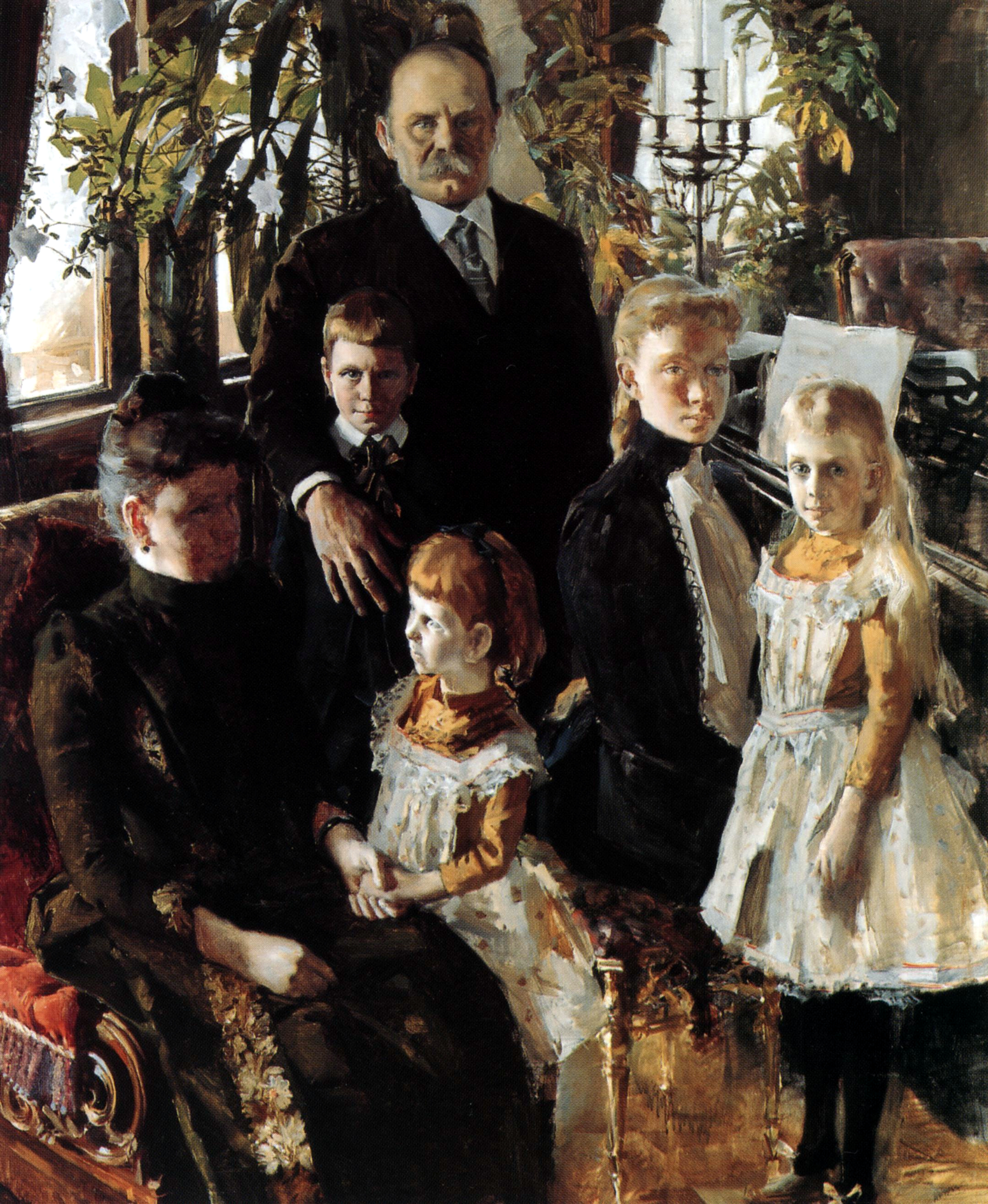
Antti and Eva Ahlström with family by Akseli Gallen-Kallela, 1890

The Ahlström family is a Finnish family of industrialists, designers and artists. They are known for being the founding family behind the Ahlstrom Corporation and for their cooperation with Alvar Aalto. Jussi Ahlström, the son of a Swedish allotment soldier and the ancestor of the Ahlström family, was from Naistenmatka, the village of Pirkkala.

== Notable members ==
- Antti Ahlström, founder of the A. Ahlström company
- Eva Ahlström CEO of A. Ahlström, first female CEO in Finland
- Walter Ahlström, CEO of A. Ahlström, son of Antti
- Rafael Ahlström, son of Antti
- Wilhelm Ahlström, son of Antti
- Hans Ahlström, CEO of A. Ahlström
- Maire Gullichsen (née Ahlström, 1907–1990), daughter of Walter, founder of Artek, resident at Villa Mairea
- Harry Gullichsen, CEO of A. Ahlström, husband of Maire
- Krister Ahlström, CEO of A. Ahlström
- Kristian Valter Gullichsen (born 1932), son of Harry & Maire, architect in the company Gullichsen Kairamo Vormala
- Johan Gullichsen, professor and a chairman of the board of directors of A. Ahlström, son of Harry & Maire
- Lilli Alanen, philosopher and professor, daughter of Harry & Maire
- Alvar Gullichsen (born 1961), artist known for his spoof Bonk Business Inc., son of Kristian
- Johanna Gullichsen, textile designer
- Sam Huber, musician and actor

== See also ==
- Ahlstrom
- List of Bilderberg attendees
- Millennium Technology Prize
