= Lilli Alanen =

Finnish philosopher (1941–2021)

Lilli Kristina Alanen (née Gullichsen; 16 October 1941 – 22 October 2021) was a Finnish philosopher and Professor Emeritus of History of Philosophy at Department of Philosophy at Uppsala University. She was elected a member of the American Academy of Arts and Sciences in 2018.

== Early life and education ==
Lilli Gullichsen was born on 16 October 1941 in Pori, Finland. She studied philosophy at the Sorbonne in Paris, where she was a student of Ferdinand Alquié, and the University of Helsinki, where she was a doctoral student of Ingmar Pörn and influenced by Georg Henrik von Wright.

== Academic career ==
In the 1980s she taught at the University of Pittsburgh in the US and in Helsinki before being named professor of philosophy at Uppsala University in 1997.

Alanen specialised in the history of philosophy, with particular interest in René Descartes and David Hume. She also contributed to feminist philosophy.

In her critically received book on Descartes (2003), Alanen goes beyond mere history, drawing out the historical antecedents and the intellectual evolution of Descartes' thinking about the mind, showing how his emphasis on the embodiment of the mind has implications far more complex and interesting than the usual dualist account associated with his thinking suggests.

Alanen was elected a member of the American Academy of Arts and Sciences in 2018. She was also a member of the Norwegian Academy of Science and Letters.

== Personal life ==
Alanen was a member of the industrialist Ahlström family. Her mother was a Finnish art collector and patron of the arts Maire Gullichsen and her father the industrialist Harry Gullichsen. Her siblings were the Finnish architect Kristian Gullichsen and Johan Gullichsen, a professor of engineering. The family home at Noormarkku near Pori is the world-famous modernist house Villa Mairea designed by architect Alvar Aalto. In 1964 she married the Finnish artist Sakari Alanen (born 1940), and they had three children. They were divorced in 1989. In 1992, Alanen married the American philosopher Frederick Stoutland (1933–2011).

Alanen died on 22 October 2021 in Helsinki.

== Selected works ==
- Lilli Alanen, Studies in Cartesian epistemology and philosophy of mind, Acta Philosophica Fennica, Helsinki, 1982.
- Lilli Alanen and Sara Heinämaa (eds.), Commonality and Particularity in Ethics, Palgrave Macmillan, London, 1997.
- Lilli Alanen and Charlotte Witt (eds.), Feminist Reflections on the History of Philosophy (The New Synthese Historical Library), Springer, New York, 2004.
- Lilli Alanen, Descartes's Concept of Mind, Harvard University Press, Cambridge, Mass., 2003.
