= 1939 in architecture =

The year 1939 in architecture involved some significant events.

== Events ==
- Jane Drew sets up an all-female architectural practice in London.

== Buildings and structures ==
=== Buildings opened ===
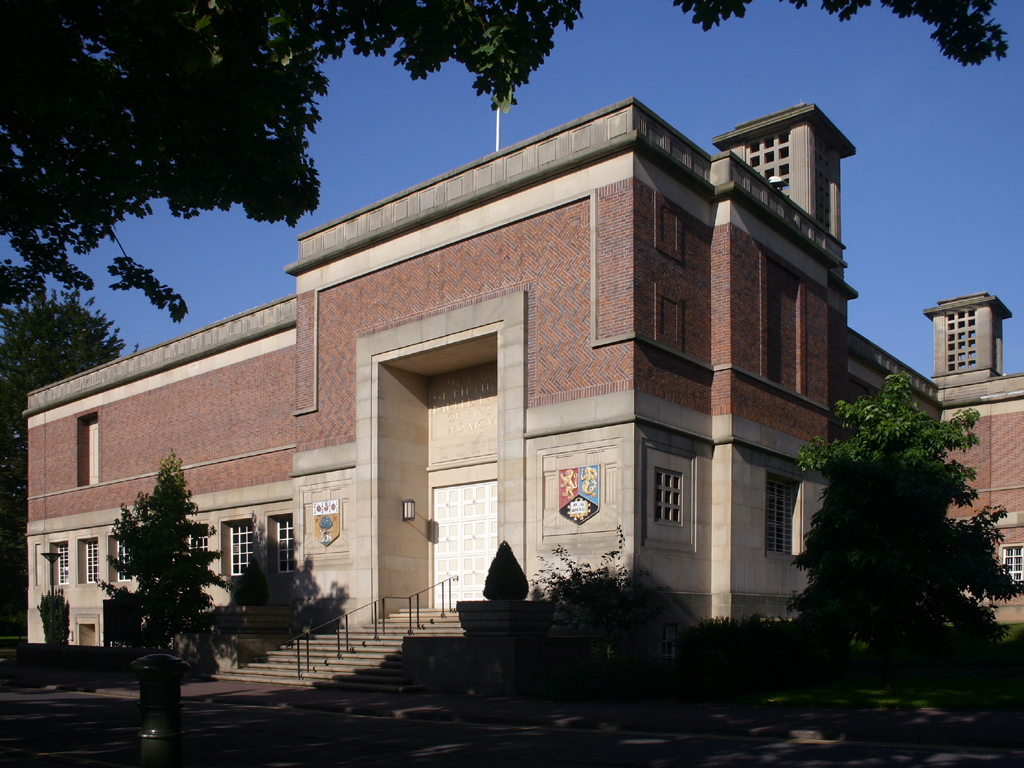
Barber Institute of Fine Arts

- April 21 – The San Jacinto Monument near Houston, Texas, United States.
- April 30 – 1939 New York World's Fair. Notable examples of temporary architecture include the Trylon and Perisphere designed by Wallace Harrison and J. André Fouilhoux and the Ireland pavilion designed by Michael Scott.
- May 7 – Vulcan Park in Birmingham, Alabama, USA.
- June 14 – St Peter the Apostle Roman Catholic Church, Gorleston, England, designed by Eric Gill.
- July 26 – The Barber Institute of Fine Arts at the University of Birmingham, England, designed by Robert Atkinson.
- November 16 – Uptown Theater (Minneapolis), designed by Liebenberg and Kaplan.

=== Other buildings ===
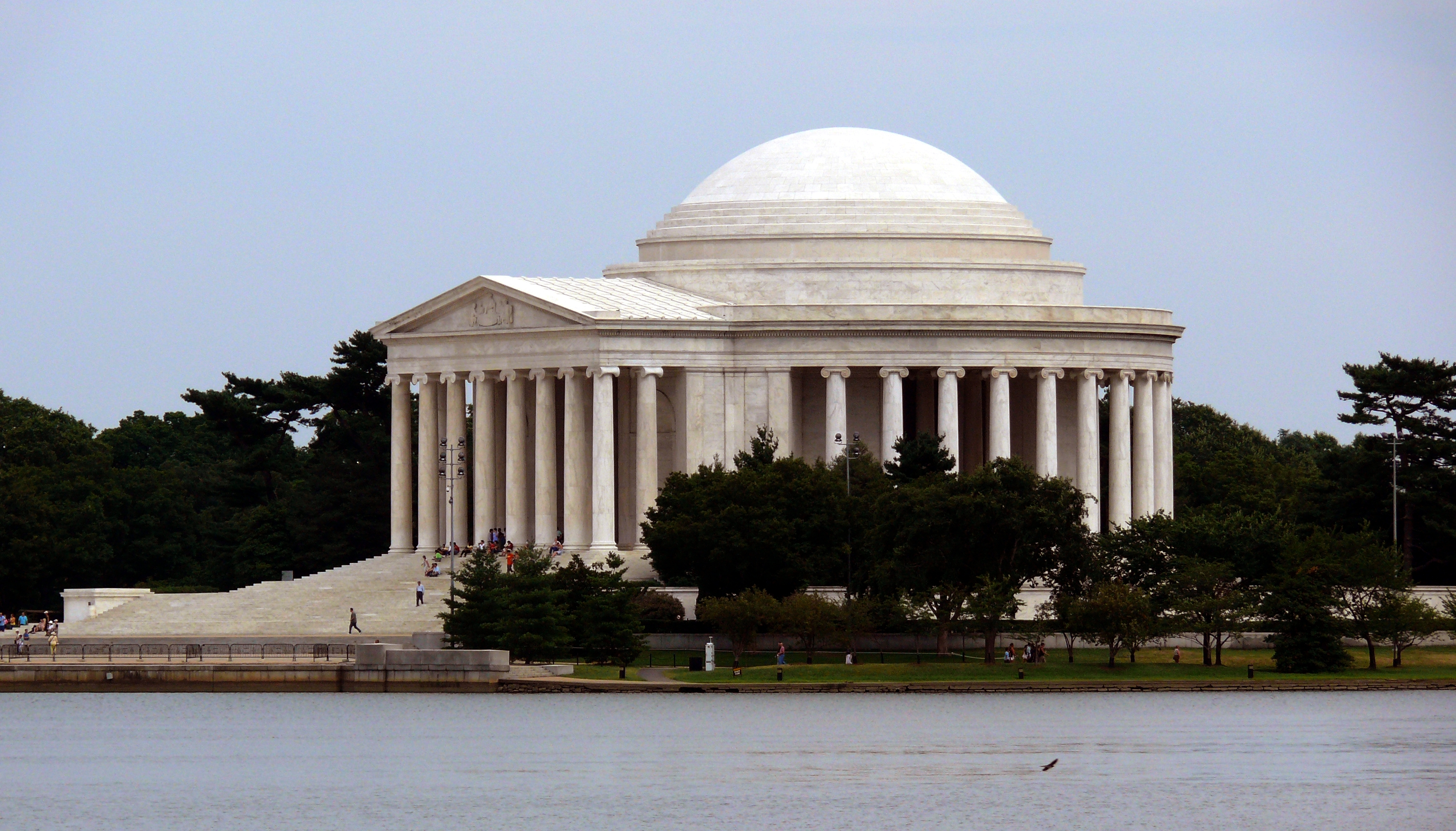
The Jefferson Memorial in Washington, D.C.

- The Jefferson Memorial in Washington, D.C., designed by John Russell Pope, is begun.
- St Patrick's Cathedral, Melbourne, Australia, designed by William Wardell in 1858, is completed.
- Dome of Saint Joseph's Oratory in Montreal, Quebec, Canada is completed.
- Hotel Vancouver in Vancouver, British Columbia, Canada.
- Impington Village College in England, designed by Walter Gropius and Maxwell Fry, is completed.
- Daily Express Building, Manchester, England, designed by engineer Sir Owen Williams, is completed.
- Marine Gate (apartments) in Brighton, England, designed by Wimperis, Simpson and Guthrie, is built.
- Remodelling of the village, manor house and parish church of Cornwell, Oxfordshire, England, by Clough Williams-Ellis is completed.
- Villa Mairea in Noormarkku, Finland, designed by Alvar Aalto for Harry and Maire Gullichsen, is completed.
- Tip Top Bakery, St Paul's Cray, London, designed by engineers Sir Alexander Gibb & Partners.

== Awards ==
- RIBA Royal Gold Medal – Percy Thomas.
- Grand Prix de Rome, architecture: Bernard Zehrfuss.

== Births ==
- March 3 – Eva Jiřičná, Czech-born architect and interior designer
- June 21 – Charles Jencks, American architectural theorist, landscape architect and designer (died 2019)
- October 1 – Philip Cox, Australian architect
- October 9 – Nicholas Grimshaw, English modernist architect (died 2025)
- December 5 – Ricardo Bofill, Catalan postmodernist architect (died 2022)

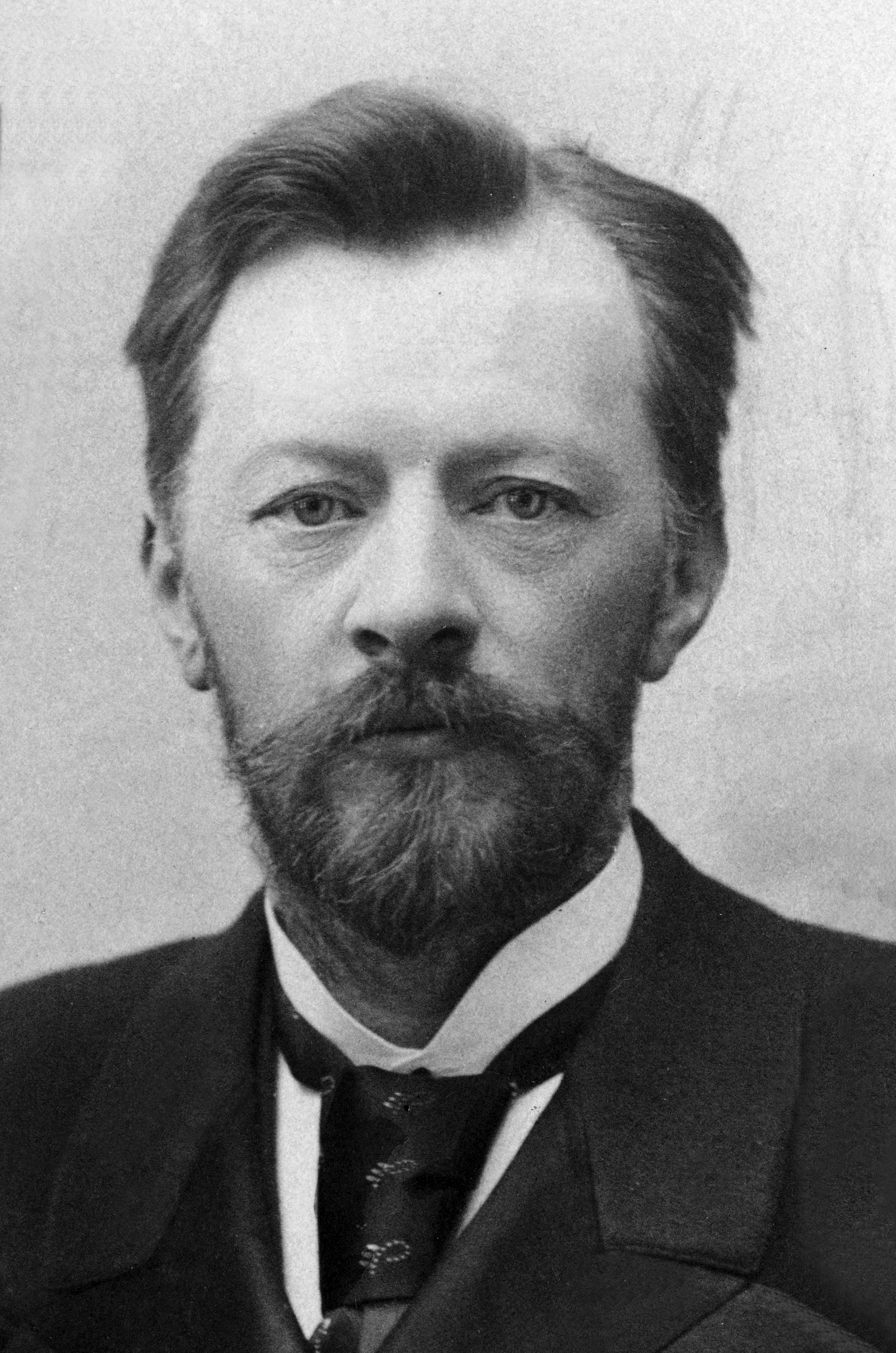
Vladimir Shukhov

== Deaths ==
- January 9 – Jānis Alksnis, Latvian architect and builder (born 1869)
- February 2 – Vladimir Shukhov, Russian structural engineer (born 1853)
- February 7 – Detmar Blow, English architect (born 1867)
- September 26 – Kirtland Cutter, American architect (born 1860)
