= Magnus Scharmanoff =

Finnish photographic artist

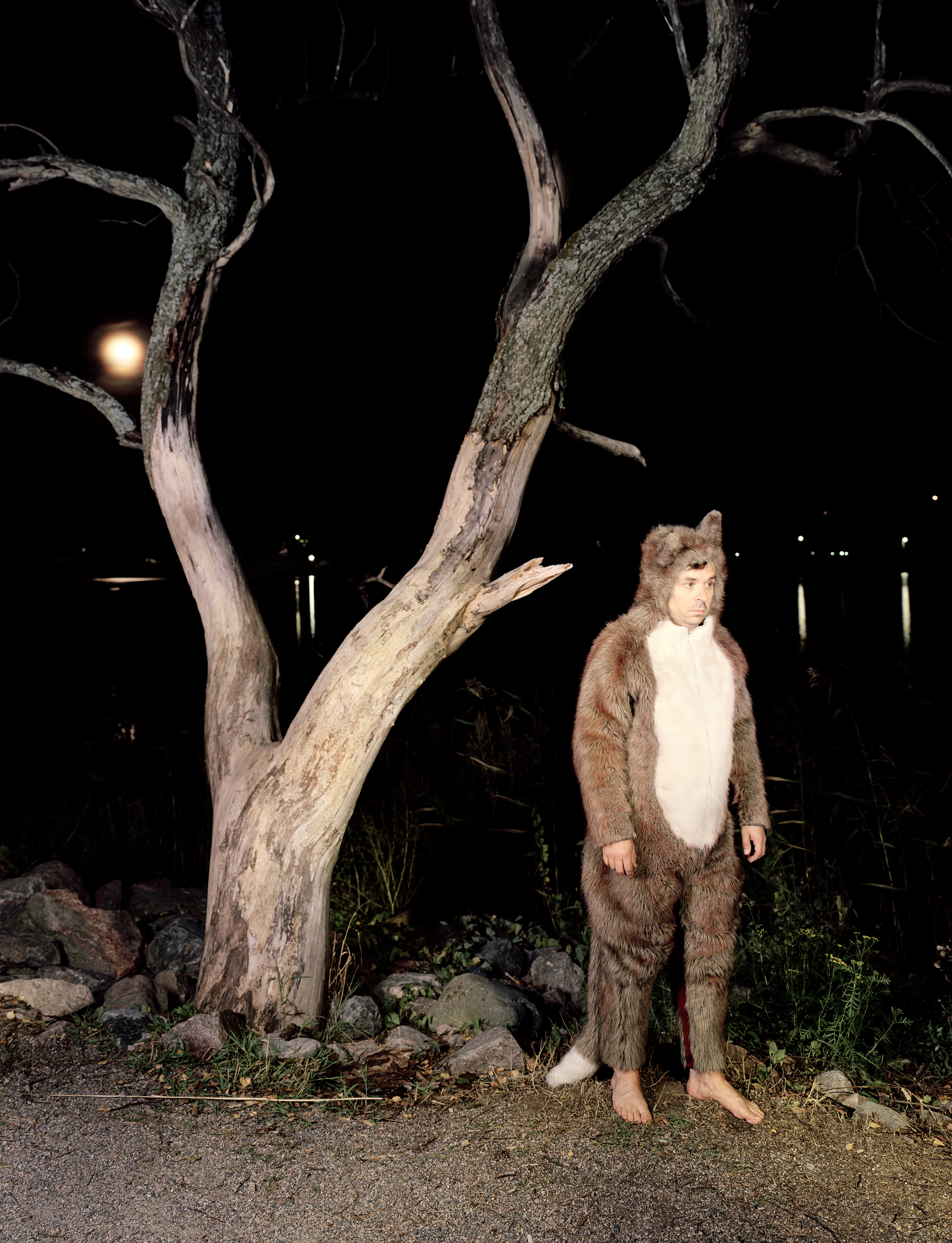

The Fox Man (2006)

Magnus Scharmanoff (born 1964) is a Finnish photographic artist, earlier associated with The Helsinki School. He lives and works in Helsinki. He helped create the Bonk Business with another Finnish artist and sculptor Alvar Gullichsen.

== Education ==
He holds a Master of Art from University of Art and Design Helsinki, Photo department in 1994.

== Private exhibitions ==
“Too Young”, was published between 1992 and 1993.

“The Hero Brothers”, was published in 1993.

“A Sense of Loss”, was published in 1997. Sense of Loss 7, which is portrayed at, the Finnish National Gallery Kiasma, resembles a film still and each photo in the series is like a scene from a film. Magnus Scharmanoff's photos are easily identified by their strong colors and staged settings. Every photo has several events which together make up a story that lends itself to multiple interpretations. There is also a documentary made in 1997 holding the same name to show the preparation of the art collection.

“The Lost Time”, was published in 2009. This collection continues to explore the aging men. While the previous collection, a sense of loss, was made in 1997, now the middle aged artist explores the role of a man from a different perspective. Man is a character from a fairy tale who walks the streets alone as a clown or explores from the distance as the women are in the control.

== Style ==
The artist himself poses in the photographs, generally playing characters that resembles of film heroes or fairy tale characters. Magnus Scharmanoff's art disturbs mainstream values and especially our notions of gender roles. He explores the role and the insecurities of men in different ages that are often surrounded by strong women. Magnus Scharmanoff stages his photographs using real-life situations usually among Finnish nature and he does not use computer manipulation. He presents traditional photography even he stretches the moods in his photos from comedy to melodrama. The Author and Professor from the University of Helsinki, Leena-Maija Rossi, who is also a specialist in art history, contemporary art and gender studies described Magnus Scharmanoff’s work in a book “Frames – Viewing Finnish Contemporary Photography”, Finnish Fund for Art Exchange 1998 as the artist who has meticulously staged the photographic scenes to remind the society of the internalization and construction of gender. The Finnish author Kari Hotakainen who wrote the introduction to his book, A Sense of Loss, which illustrates the collection said that he wishes there would be more of those days staged by Scharmanoff.

== Works in Collections ==
He has works in collections in Helsinki City Art Museum, The Museum of Contemporary Art Kiasma in Helsinki and The State Art Collection in Finland. He has also other works in collections in Finland. The Hospital of Kellokoski, The City of Riihimäki, Heino Collection, Arwidson ltd, Filmikonttori ltd and several private collections.

== Commercial Work ==
Bonk Business Inc. is a fictional corporation created in 1988 by Finnish artist and sculptor Alvar Gullichsen, which creates whimsical inventions such as LBH (Localized Black Holes), ADS (Advanced Disinformation Systems), Cosmic Therapy and Defunctioned Machinery. The roots of the company lie over a century ago in Finland, with the discovery of Anchovy Oil, which greased the frozen wheels of Nordic industry in the 19th century. Magnus Scharmanoff has been member of the project since 1994 and the other members of the project include Richard Stanley and Henrik Helpiö. There is a Bonk museum in Uusikaupunki, where the Bonk machines are displayed.

His other commercial work includes working with the largest news paper in Finland, Helsingin Sanomat, portraying people like Asko Sarkola the head of Helsinki City Theatre and clients such as Merita Bank, currently Nordea Bank.
