= Free Art School =

Art school in Helsinki, Finland

- Vapaa Taidekoulu
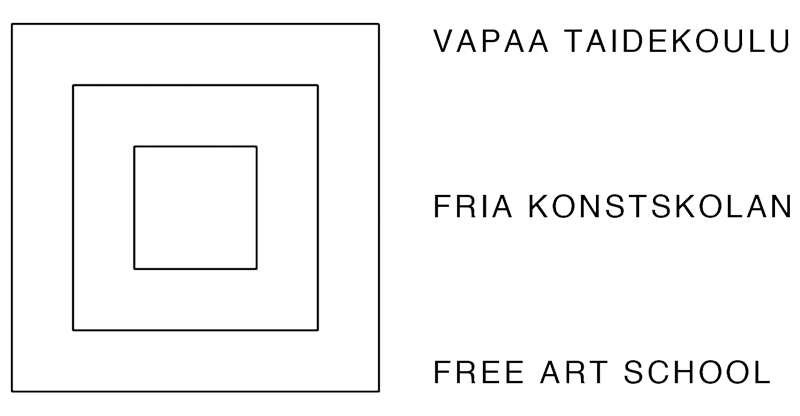
- The Free Art School logo
- Type: Art school
- Established: 1935
- Rector: Elina Merenmies
- Students: 70
- Location: Helsinki, Finland; 60.1596°N 24.9146°E
- Website: vapaataidekoulu.fi

Free Art School (Vapaa Taidekoulu, Fria Konstskolan) is an independent art school in Helsinki, Finland, founded in 1935. The school specializes in painting and is known for its emphasis on artistic freedom and individual development. Since 1990, it has been located at the Cable Factory (Kaapelitehdas), a major cultural centre in the Ruoholahti district of Helsinki.

== History ==
The Free Art School was established at the end of 1934 on the initiative of art patron Maire Gullichsen and opened in January 1935. Gullichsen aimed to create an art school in Helsinki similar to the free academies of Paris — open to everyone and free from rigid academic curricula. She was dissatisfied with the traditional Finnish teaching methods of the time, which often began with copying plaster casts.

The school opened its doors on 15 January 1935 in a studio at Eteläranta 14. It soon moved to Ullanlinnankatu 1, and in 1937, to larger premises on Kasarminkatu, in an industrial building owned by A. Ahlström Oy. The school remained there until 1990, when it relocated to the Cable Factory.

In 1971, a four-year study programme leading to a professional qualification in painting was introduced.

== Studies ==
The school offers a four-year program focused on painting. Teaching is studio-based, emphasizing observation, colour and form studies, individual artistic development, and critical reflection on the artist's role in contemporary society.

== Admission ==
The student selection process at the Free Art School consists of two stages. First-year painting students are admitted each spring through a preparatory painting course (25 students are selected annually). Admission is based on an assessment of the works produced during the course, as well as the applicant's artistic progress and motivation. Advancement to the second year is determined by the student's performance during the first year.

== Open courses ==
The Free Art School offers art courses open to the general public. These include life drawing courses held during the autumn and spring terms, an intensive drawing course, and a watercolor painting course. Intensive courses last one weekend, while other courses meet once a week for ten sessions.

== Distinctive features of teaching ==
The Free Art School is distinguished by its strong emphasis on painting. The teaching aims to provide students with a profound experience of visual perception and the expressive potential of colour, supporting the development of each student's individual artistic expression. While the school maintains an open attitude toward various forms of art, its instruction remains centered on its primary discipline: painting.

== Rectors ==
Rectors of Vapaa Taidekoulu since 1958.

Period	Rector	Notes
1958–1961	Unto Pusa	
1961–1964	Torger Enckell	
1965–1966	Unto Pusa	
1966–1987	Tor Arne	
1988–1989, 1990–1995	Carolus Enckell	
1989–1990	Ilmari Rautio	
1995–1998	Päivi Björkenheim	
1998–2005	Reijo Viljanen	
2005–2006	Janne Räisänen	Artistic Director
2006–2013	Pekka Hepoluhta	Artistic Director
2014–2016	Sari Tenni	
2017–2019	Paavo Paunu	
2020–present	Elina Merenmies	

== Selected publications ==
- Josef Albers, Värien vuorovaikutus, Free Art School, 1978. ISBN 951-95982-3-5.
- Hans Hofmann, Esseitä, Free Art School, 1983. ISBN 951-99353-2-0.
- Josef Albers, Taito nähdä, Free Art School, 1985. ISBN 951-99619-0-9.
- Tor Arne, Carolus Enckell, Markku Komonen, Seppo Niinivaara, Juhani Pallasmaa, Näkemisen kentät, Free Art School, 1985. ISBN 951-95982-0-0.
- Agnes Martin, Hiljaisuus taloni lattialla, Free Art School, 1990. ISBN 951-95982-1-9.
- Ad Reinhardt, Taide taiteena, Free Art School, 1995. ISBN 951-95982-4-3.
- Pekka Hepoluhta, Carolus Enckell, Reijo Viljanen, Juhani Pallasmaa, Juan Antonio Muro, Voisitko nähdä näin, Free Art School, 2011. ISBN 978-951-95982-6-0.
- Meri Karppanen, Elina Merenmies, Satu Metsola, Juhani Pallasmaa, Magnus Quaife, Riikka Stewen, Juha-Heikki Tihinen. Edited by Pirkko Tuukkanen, Vapaa Taidekoulu | Fria Konstskolan | Free Art School: Teaching Painting for 90 Years, Vapaa Taidekoulu & HAM Helsinki Art Museum, 2025. ISBN 978-952-7611-01-2.
