= Porin maalaiskunta =

Coordinates: 61.559368°N 21.61191°E

- Former municipality
- Porin maalaiskunta Björneborgs landskommun
- Coat of arms

- Location of Porin mlk in Finland
- Country: Finland
- Region: Satakunta
- Consolidated: 1967

Area
  - Land: 166.0 km^{2} (64.1 sq mi)

Population (1963)
  - Total: 8,709
  - Density: 52.46/km^{2} (135.9/sq mi)
- Time zone: UTC+2 (EET)
  - Summer (DST): UTC+3 (EEST)

Porin maalaiskunta (abbr. Porin mlk, Swedish: Björneborgs landskommun, "the Rural Municipality of Pori") is a former municipality in the province of Satakunta, Finland. It was annexed with the city of Pori in 1967. Population of Porin maalaiskunta was 8,709 in 1963.

Porin maalaiskunta covered areas like Yyteri and the Port of Pori, which are parts of the present Meri-Pori district.

== Notable people ==
- Eino Grön
- Kelpo Gröndahl
- Johan Gullichsen
- Maire Gullichsen
- Aarne Tarkas
- Miikka Toivola

== See also ==
- Maalaiskunta
