= Pori Art Museum =

Art museum in Pori, Finland

- Porin taidemuseo
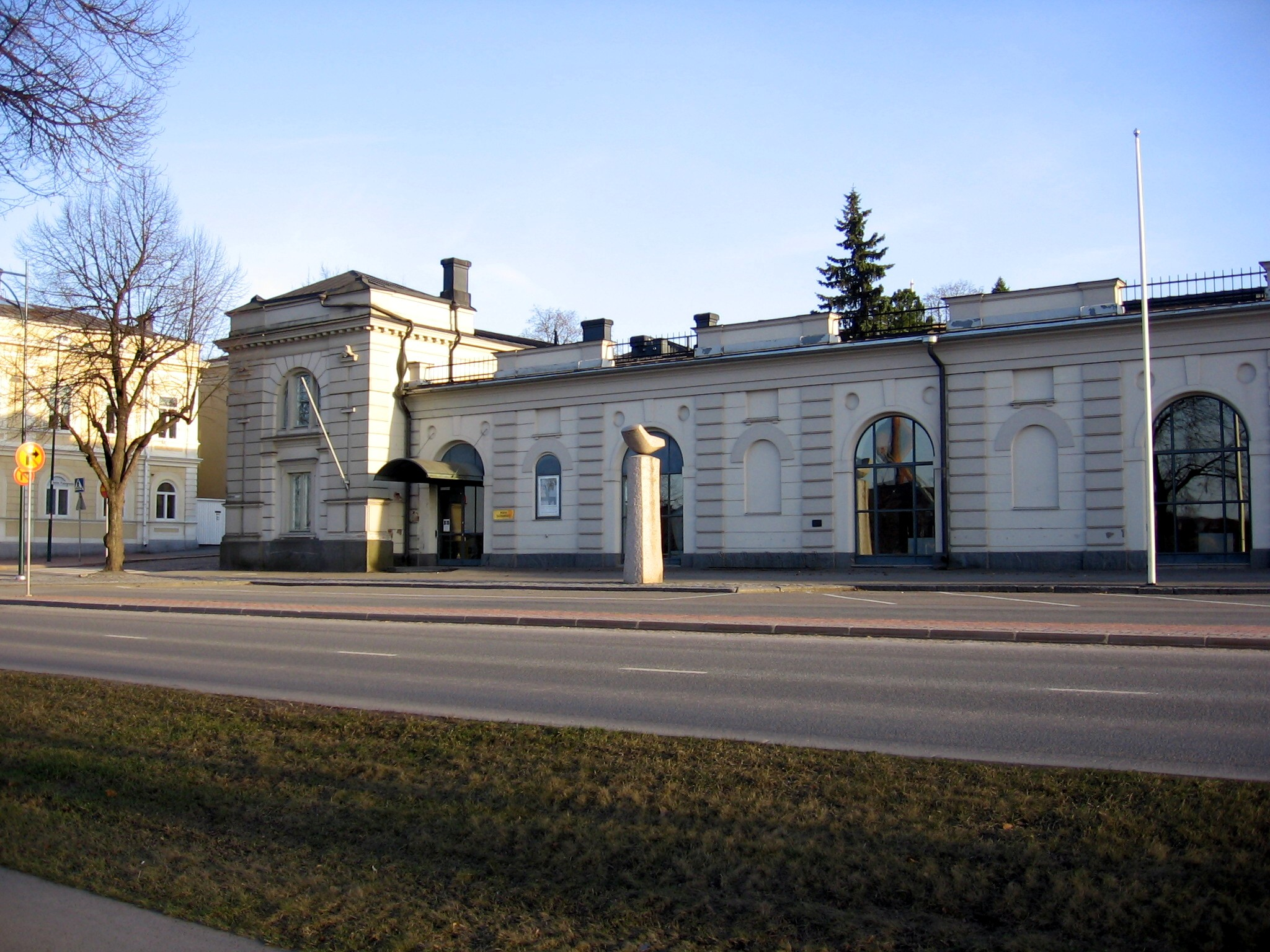
- Established: 1979
- Location: Pori, Finland
- Coordinates: 61.4901°N 21.7942°E
- Website: www.poriartmuseum.fi

Pori Art Museum, (Finnish: Porin taidemuseo, Swedish: Björneborgs konstmuseum) is a museum of contemporary and modern art in Pori, Finland. It was established in 1979, mainly by the efforts of professor Maire Gullichsen (1907- 1990), co-founder of the furniture company Artek. Pori Art Museum has several art collections as well as changing exhibitions.

The museum is located in the centre of the city by the river Kokemäenjoki. The building is an old weigh house that was designed by architect C. J. von Heideken (1832–1888). It was originally built in 1860 and renovated for museum use in 1979–1981 by the design of architect Kristian Gullichsen. The latest extension of the museum was completed in 2000. The exhibition area is about 800 m^{2}. The museum does also have a library, picture archive, shop and a café.

Pori Art Museum's two main collections are the collection of Maire Gullichsen Art Foundation and the Pori Municipal Collection. Maire Gullichsen Art Foundation collection consists mainly of Finnish art from the late 19th century to the 1980s. The main focus of the Pori Municipal Collection is on 20th-century art together with 19th-century Finnish artists as Akseli Gallen-Kallela (1865–1931) and Victor Westerholm (1860–1919).

The collections have works by many notable international artists, including names like José Bedia Valdés, Ian McKeever, Leonhard Lapin, Yan Pei Ming, Georges Rousse, Yoko Ono and Dennis Oppenheim.
