= 1853 in architecture =

The year 1853 in architecture involved some significant architectural events and new buildings.

== Events ==
- June 30 – Georges-Eugène Haussmann is selected as préfect of the Seine (department) to begin the re-planning of Paris.

== Buildings and structures ==
=== Buildings ===
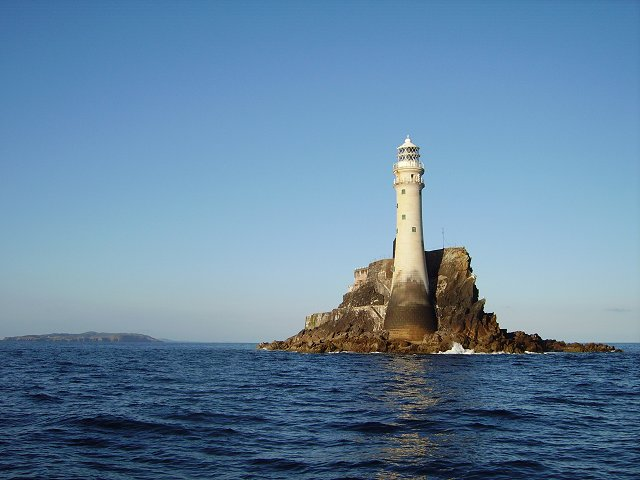
Fastnet Lighthouse

- Fastnet Rock Lighthouse is completed at the most southerly point of Ireland.
- The New York Crystal Palace is constructed for the Exhibition of the Industry of All Nations in New York City.
- The New York Cotton Exchange building is completed in New York City.
- Rhode Island Tool Company building is completed in Providence, Rhode Island.
- Charlbury railway station in Oxfordshire, England, designed by I. K. Brunel, is opened.

== Awards ==
- RIBA Royal Gold Medal – Robert Smirke.
- Grand Prix de Rome, architecture – Arthur-Stanislas Diet.

== Births ==
- February 26 – Antonio Rivas Mercado, Mexican architect, engineer and restorer (died 1927)
- June 21 – Peder Vilhelm Jensen-Klint, Danish architect, designer, painter and architectural theorist (died 1930)
- August 28 (August 16 O.S.) – Vladimir Shukhov, Russian structural engineer (died 1939)
- September 11 – Stanford White, American architect (died 1906)

== Deaths ==
- December 12 – William Nichols, English-born American Neoclassical architect (born 1780)
