= Eino Grön =

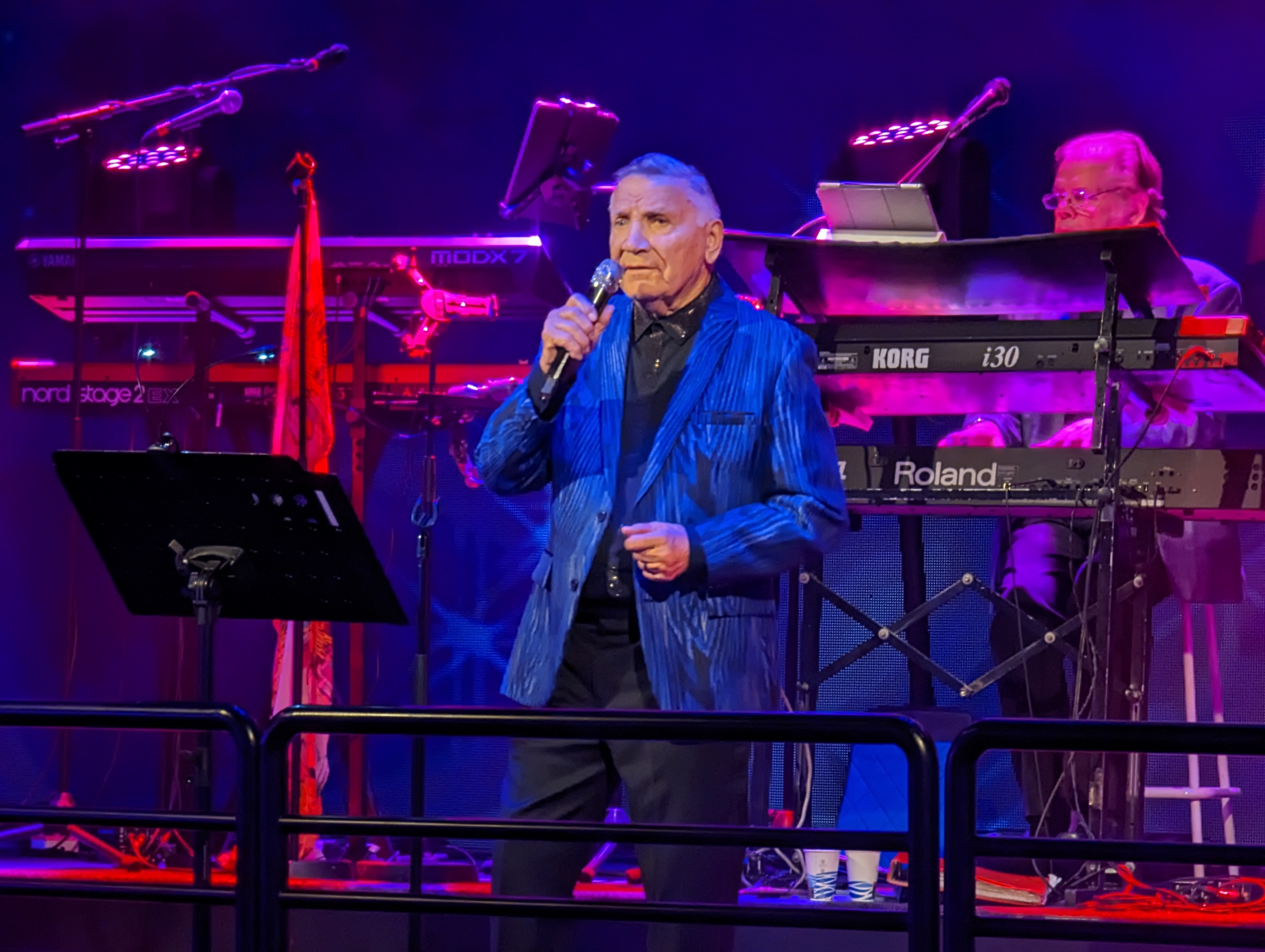
- Eino Grön in 2023

Background information
- Birth name: Eino Joel Grön
- Born: January 31, 1939 (age 86); Porin maalaiskunta, Finland
- Genres: tango, jazz, schlager, religious music
- Occupation: singer
- Years active: 1957–present
- Labels: Warner Music Group
- Website: einogron.net

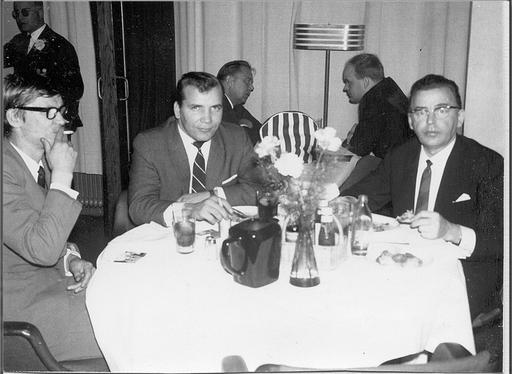
Juha Vainio, Eino Grön and Olavi Virta in 1965.

Eino Grön, born January 31, 1939, is a Finnish American singer known for his performance of a wide range of popular music styles, including Tango, jazz, and spiritual music. Grön was born at the island of Reposaari in Pori but has lived the last 30 years mainly in Palm Beach, Florida.

Grön made his first recording in 1958 and he is one of the most iconic persons in the Finnish popular music scene. Grön is best known as a tango singer but his styles vary from Finnish schlager to jazz and spiritual music, such as traditional Christmas songs. He has made recordings with many other artists like Argentine tango musicians and Finnish jazz clarinet player Antti Sarpila. Grön's discography includes 28 studio albums and several compilations.

In 2001 Grön received the Pro Finlandia Medal of the Order of the Lion of Finland.

== Discography ==
=== Studio albums ===
- 1969: Tangoserenadi – Eino Grön laulaa
- 1971: Rakkaustarinoita
- 1971: Ikivihreä Eino Grön
- 1973: Eino Grön laulaa suomalaisia tangoja
- 1973: Eino Grön
- 1974: Hetki muistoille
- 1975: Meidän laulumme
- 1977: Hartaita lauluja
- 1977: Eino Grön mestareiden seurassa
- 1983: Merellä ja kotisatamassa
- 1984: Tangon kotimaa
- 1987: Bandoneon
- 1987: Eino Grön
- 1989: Mustarastas: Suomalaisia laulelmia
- 1990: Sininen ja valkoinen
- 1992: Sulle lauluni laadin
- 1992: Kotikirkkoni: Eino Grön laulaa Tuomaslauluja
- 1995: Kuinka kaunista on
- 1997: Vähemmän kiirettä, enemmän aikaa
- 1997: Unelmatangoja
- 1999: Sinut löysin uudestaan
- 2000: Romanttinen Eino Grön
- 2000: Lapsuusajan joulu
- 2002: Kotikirkkoni
- 2003: Yötuuli
- 2003: Antti Sarpila featuring Eino Grön: Swinging Christmas (vol. 3)
- 2004: Antti Sarpila meets Eino Grön: Swingin' n' Singin'
- 2007: Minun jouluni

=== Joint albums with Reijo Taipale ===
- 1970: 16 tangoa
- 1973: 16 tangoa 2
- 1978: 16 tangoa (1978)
- 1978: Toiset 16 tangoa

=== Compilation albums ===
- 1965: Eino Grön (1965)
- 1967: Eino Grön (1967)
- 1967: Eino Grön laulaa tangoja
- 1974: Romanttinen Eino Grön
- 1978: Parhaat päältä
- 1980: Kauneimmat valssit
- 1981: Meidän tangomme
- 1982: Suomalaisen tangon taikaa
- 1988: 28 ikivihreää
- 1993: Parhaat
- 1995: 20 suosikkia – Seinillä on korvat
- 1997: 20 suosikkia – Tango d'amore
- 1998: 20 suosikkia – Tangokavaljeeri
- 1998: 20 suosikkia – Soi maininki hiljainen
- 2001: Musiikin tähtihetkiä (vol. 16)
- 2002: 20 suosikkia – Suudelmin suljetut kirjeet
- 2002: 20 suosikkia – Kotona taas
- 2003: Suomi huiput: 20 Hittiä
- 2006: Jokainen päiväni – Kauneimmat lauluni
- 2008: Tämä elämä – Kaikkien aikojen parhaat
- 2011: Lauluja rakkaudesta –vuosikymmenten suosikit
- 2013: Samettisilmäinen tyttöni

=== Featuring ===
- 2021: Hyvät hautajaiset (Pyhimys feat. Eino Grön)

== Television specials ==
- 1988: Eino Grön – Tangoja ja laulelmia (YLE TV1) with Jaakko Salo Orchestra
- 1993: Eino Grön 35 (YLE TV1) with Lahden kaupunginorkesteri
- 2004: Eino Grön – Taru tangon herrasta, documentary (YLE TV2)
- 2004: Estradilla: Eino Grön 65 (YLE TV2)
