= Maire Gullichsen =

Finnish art patron and co-founder of Artek

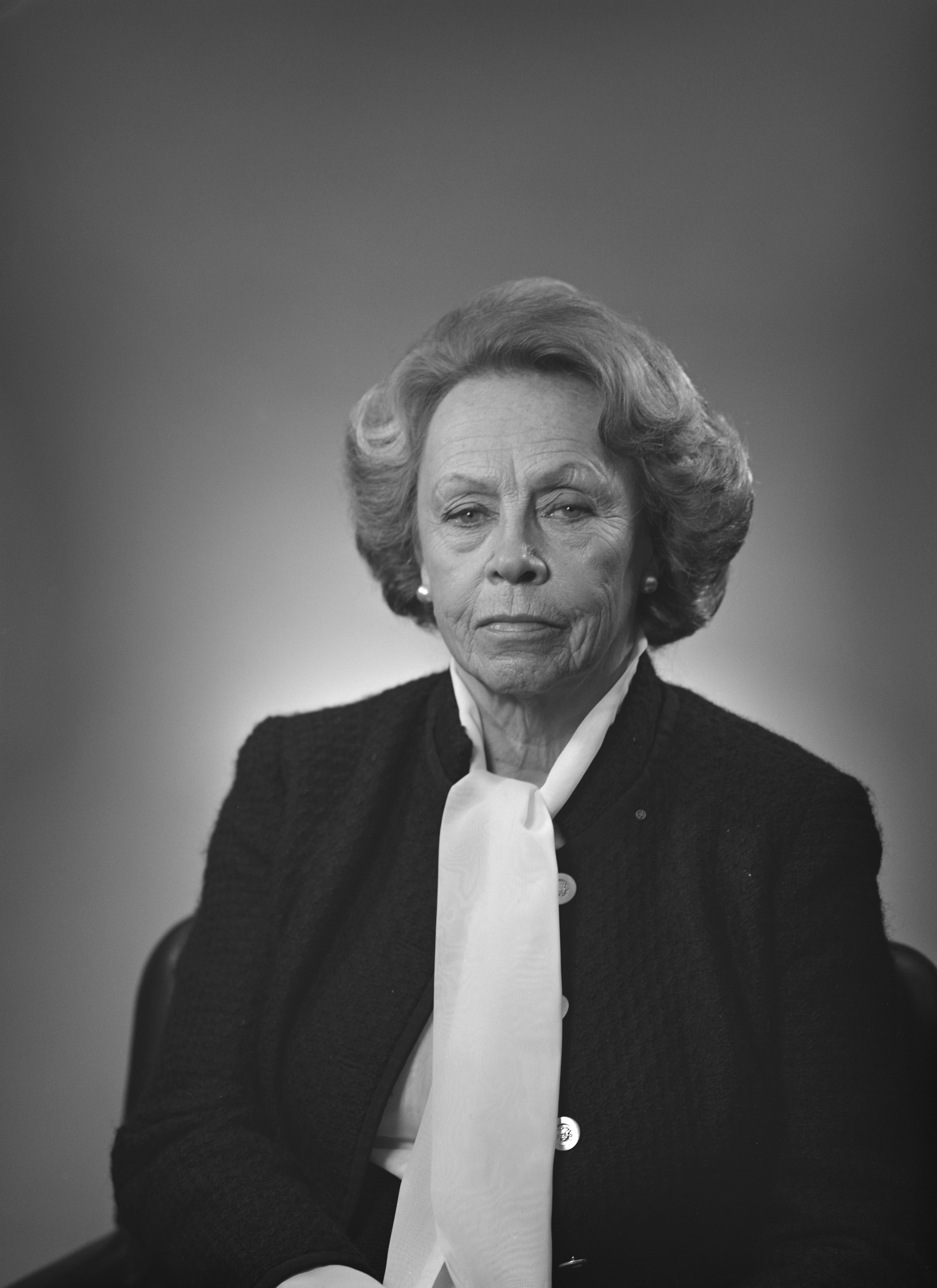
- Maire Gullichsen in 1982
- Born: Maire Eva Johanna Ahlström; June 24, 1907; Noormarkku, Finland
- Died: July 9, 1990 (aged 83); Noormarkku, Finland
- Occupations: Art patron, businesswoman
- Known for: Co-founder of Artek; founder of Pori Art Museum
- Spouse(s): Harry Gullichsen (1928–1954); Bertil C. Nyströmer (1969–1990)
- Children: Kristian Gullichsen; Johan Gullichsen; Lilli Alanen
- Relatives: Alvar Gullichsen (grandson); Ronja Stanley (great-granddaughter)

Maire Eva Johanna Gullichsen (née Ahlström, later known as Gullichsen-Nyströmer; 24 June 1907, Noormarkku – 9 July 1990, Noormarkku) was a Finnish art patron, promoter of modernism and businesswoman. She was one of the most influential figures on the Finnish art scene from the 1930s onwards, contributing decisively to the breakthrough of modernism in Finnish visual art and design. She co-founded Artek (1935) together with Aino and Alvar Aalto, initiated the Free Art School in Helsinki, and established the foundation that became the basis for the Pori Art Museum.

== Biography ==
=== Early life and education ===
Gullichsen was the daughter of businessman Walter Ahlström and granddaughter of Antti Ahlström, one of the wealthiest men in 19th-century Finland.

She came into contact with contemporary art through her parents and their artistic circles. A formative influence was her encounter with the work of Magnus Enckell, whose use of colour shaped her approach to collecting. She left school early and studied art in Helsinki, including at the Ateneum, before travelling to Paris in 1925. There she studied under several artists; in 1927 she lived together with painter Ethel Thesleff and studied at private academies. Her studies culminated in Fernand Léger's studio, giving her a deep familiarity with Léger's and Matisse's work.

=== Promoting modernism ===
After returning to Finland, Gullichsen married economist Harry Gullichsen in 1928. He worked at A. Ahlström Ab and was supportive of his wife's progressive cultural interests. Gullichsen became a central figure in the Swedish-speaking, culturally radical circles in Helsinki, and deliberately distanced herself from her conservative background. After her father's death in 1931 she gained greater financial independence, enabling several progressive cultural projects.

==== Free Art School ====
In 1935 Gullichsen co-founded the Free Art School in Helsinki together with Ethel Thesleff and friends Irja Noponen and Saara Castrén. The school had no entrance requirements and was open to all, modelled on the academies in Paris. It operated in opposition to the prevailing art establishment and played a significant role in the breakthrough of abstract art in Finland, particularly in the 1950s.

==== Artek ====
Also in 1935, Gullichsen co-founded Artek together with Aino and Alvar Aalto and art historian Nils-Gustav Hahl. The initiative grew out of Gullichsen's ambition to establish a gallery for modern art in Helsinki and growing international interest in Aalto's furniture, particularly from England. Hahl became the company's first managing director, responsible also for its art programme. Gullichsen herself served as managing director from 1955 to 1958. Artek became a key vehicle for spreading modern Finnish design internationally.

==== Exhibitions and Nykytaide ry ====
As an exhibition organiser and co-founder of the association Nykytaide ry Gullichsen played a central role in introducing international modernism to Finland. Particularly significant was a large exhibition of French modern art at the Helsinki Art Hall in 1939, presenting works by Picasso, Matisse, Braque and others.

=== Villa Mairea ===
In 1937–1939 the Gullichsens commissioned Villa Mairea near Noormarkku, designed by Aino and Alvar Aalto. Gullichsen was closely involved in the interior work and intended the villa to serve also as a setting for her art collection. It is among the most internationally recognised works of Alvar Aalto.

=== Pori Art Museum ===
From the late 1960s Gullichsen worked to establish an art museum in Pori. The Maire Gullichsen Art Foundation was created in 1971, and the Pori Art Museum was inaugurated in 1981, housed in a restored warehouse designed by her son, architect Kristian Gullichsen. The collection focuses primarily on Finnish art from around 1900 to the 1980s, with an emphasis on abstract art.

=== Family ===
Maire and Harry Gullichsen (1902–1954) had three children: architect Kristian Gullichsen (1932–2021), professor and former Olympic sailor Johan Gullichsen (born 1936), and philosopher and professor Lilli Alanen (1941–2021) of Uppsala University. After Harry Gullichsen's death in 1954, Maire Gullichsen married Captain Bertil C. Nyströmer in 1969. Alvar Gullichsen is a grandson and Ronja Stanley a great-granddaughter.

== See also ==
- Ahlström–Gullichsen family
