= Ferdinand Alquié =

French philosopher (1906–1985)

- Born: 18 December 1906; Carcassonne, Aude, France
- Died: 28 February 1985 (aged 78); Montpellier, France

Education
- Education: University of Paris
- Doctoral advisor: Léon Brunschvicg
- Other advisors: Émile Bréhier; Étienne Gilson; Jean Laporte

Philosophical work
- Era: 20th-century philosophy
- Region: Western philosophy
- School: Continental philosophy Cartesianism
- Institutions: University of Montpellier; University of Paris
- Doctoral students: Gilles Deleuze; Jean-Luc Marion
- Notable students: Lilli Alanen; Jean Laplanche
- Main interests: History of philosophy Metaphysics
- Notable ideas: Philosophical interpretation of surrealism

Ferdinand Alquié (French: [alkje]; 18 December 1906 – 28 February 1985) was a French philosopher and member of the Académie des Sciences Morales et Politiques from 1978.

In the years 1931 to 1945 he was a professor in various provincial and Parisian lycees, and later at the University of Montpellier and Sorbonne where he worked until he retired in 1979.

== Career ==
Alquié's career was dominated by the decades-long polemic between himself as a Cartesian and the Spinozian perspective of his rival Martial Gueroult. He was vehemently opposed to all forms of philosophical monism and felt that human life is permeated by various forms of dualism. He was opposed to totalitarianism as well as to Marxism; as a close friend of André Breton, he aligned himself with the surrealist project.

He was an instructor of Gilles Deleuze, whom, according to Michael Hardt, he accused of drawing on biology, psychology, and other fields, neglecting philosophy. Deleuze responded by agreeing with Alquié and moreover, he argued that his primary interest was precisely in the metaphysics science needs rather than in the science philosophy needs. Alquié went on to direct Deleuze's secondary doctoral thesis, Expressionism in Philosophy: Spinoza. His students at the Sorbonne also included Lilli Alanen and Jean-Luc Marion.

Alquié published many books about Descartes, Kant and Spinoza, as well as a book on Nicolas Malebranche. He was close to the artist André Breton and wrote Philosophy of Surrealism (1955), which espoused a view of surrealism as a form of humanism that values the vibrant potential of the unconscious mind.

== Works ==
- Leçon de philosophie, 2 vols., Didier, 1931–1951.
- Notes sur la première partie des Principes de la philosophie de Descartes, Éditions Chantiers, 1933.
- Le Problème moral, Éditions Chantiers, 1933.
- Les États représentatifs, Éditions Chantiers, 1934.
- Les Mouvements et les actes, Éditions Chantiers, 1934.
- Plans de philosophie générale, Éditions Chantiers, 1934; réédition La Table Ronde, "La Petite Vermillon", 2000.
- La Science, Éditions Chantiers, 1934.
- Les Devoirs et la vie morale (plans de morale spéciale), Éditions Chantiers, 1935.
- Notions de psychologie générale, Éditions Chantiers, 1935.
- Les Tendances et la raison, Éditions Chantiers, 1935.
- Les Sciences mathématiques, les sciences de la matière et de la vie, Éditions Chantiers, 1936.
- Les Synthèses représentatives, Éditions Chantiers, 1936.
- Les États affectifs, Éditions Chantiers, 1937.
- Les Opérations intellectuelles, Éditions Chantiers, 1937.
- Le Désir d'éternité, PUF, 1943.
- Introduction à la lecture de la Critique de la raison pure, PUF, 1943.
- La Découverte métaphysique de l'homme chez Descartes, PUF, 1950.
- La Nostalgie de l'être, PUF, 1950.
- Science et métaphysique chez Descartes, Les Cours de Sorbonne, CDU, 1955.
- Philosophie du surréalisme, Flammarion, 1955.
- Descartes, l'homme et l'œuvre, Connaissance des Lettres, Hatier, 1956.
- L'Expérience, PUF, 1957.
- Édition de textes choisis de l'Éthique de Spinoza, PUF, 1961.
- Édition des Œuvres philosophiques de Descartes, 3 vols., Garnier, 1963-1973.
- Nature et vérité dans la philosophie de Spinoza, Les Cours de Sorbonne, CDU, 1965.
- Solitude de la raison, Le Terrain vague, 1966.
- La Critique kantienne de la métaphysique, PUF, 1968.
- Entretiens sur le surréalisme, W. de Gruyter, 1968.
- Signification de la philosophie, Hachette, 1971.
- Le Cartésianisme de Malebranche, Vrin, 1974.
- Malebranche et le rationalisme chrétien, Seghers, 1977.
- La Conscience affective, Vrin, 1979.
- Le Rationalisme de Spinoza, PUF, 1981.
- Servitude et liberté chez Spinoza, Les Cours de Sorbonne, CDU.
- La Morale de Kant, Les Cours de Sorbonne, 1957.
- Édition des Œuvres philosophiques de Kant, 3 vols., Gallimard, Bibliothèque de la Pléiade, 1980, 1984, 1986.
- Études cartésiennes, Vrin, 1983.
