= Bonk Business =

Art concept by Alvar Gullischen

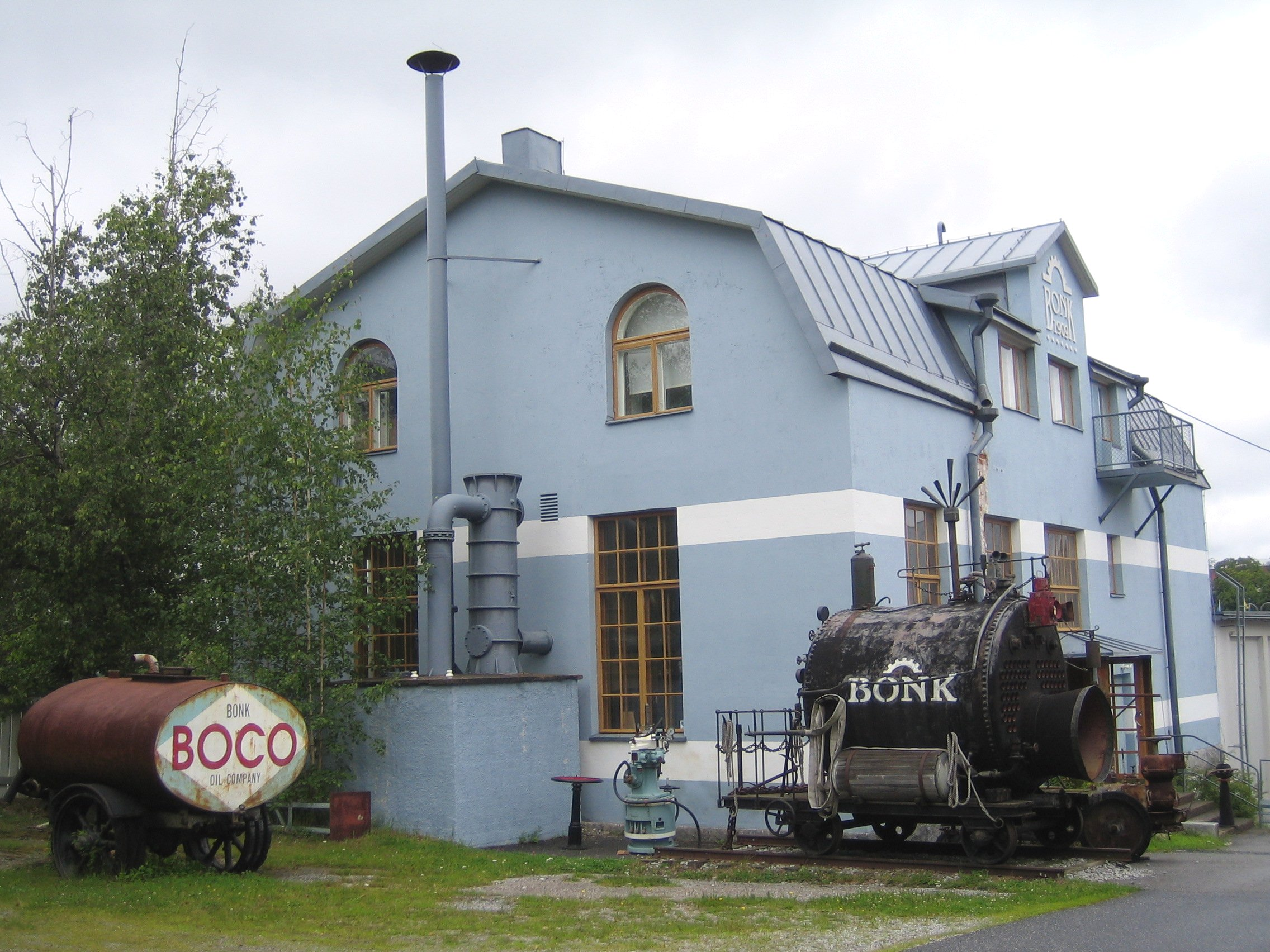
Bonk Centre in Uusikaupunki, Finland

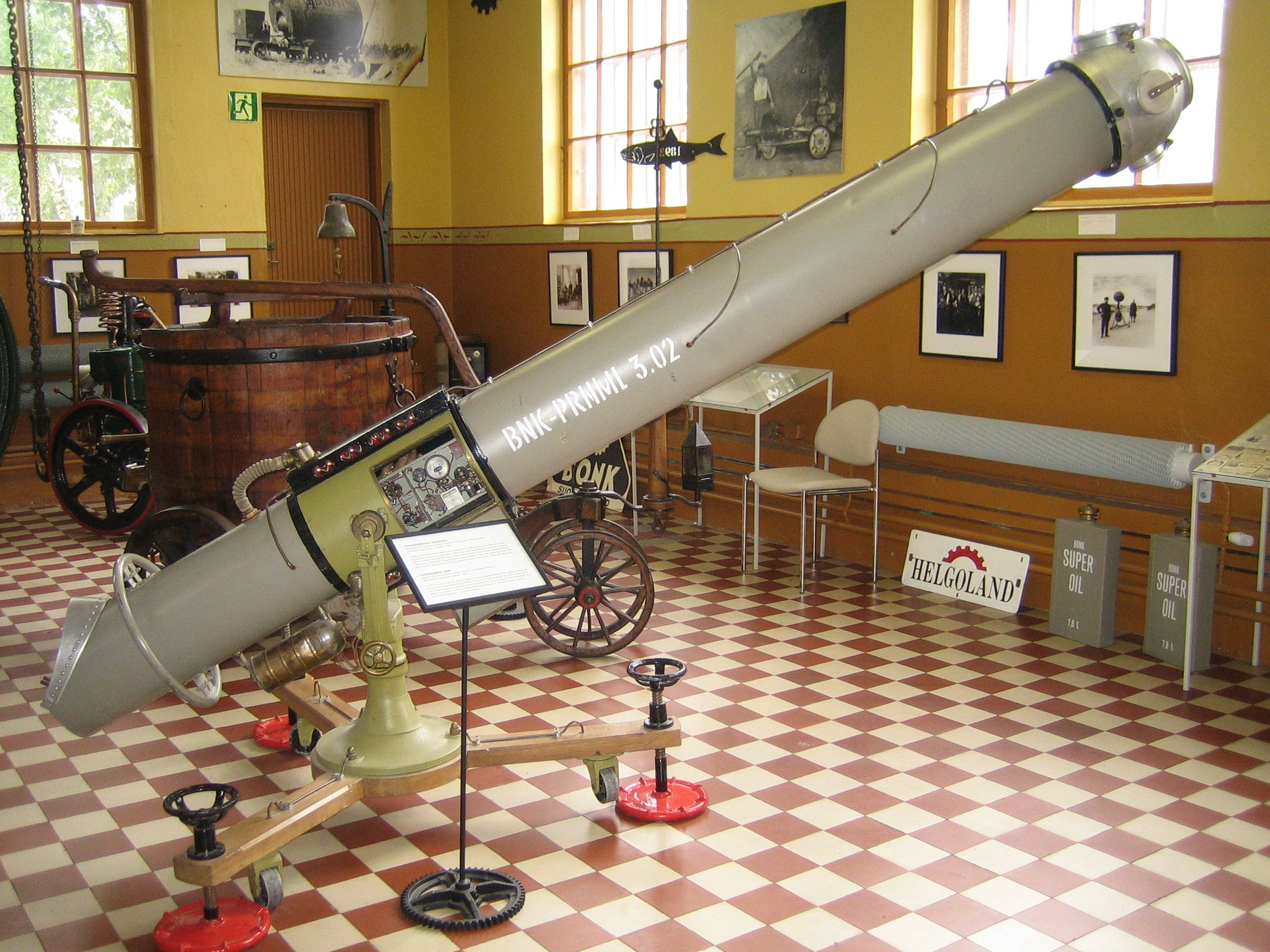
"Paranormal cannon" in Bonk Centre

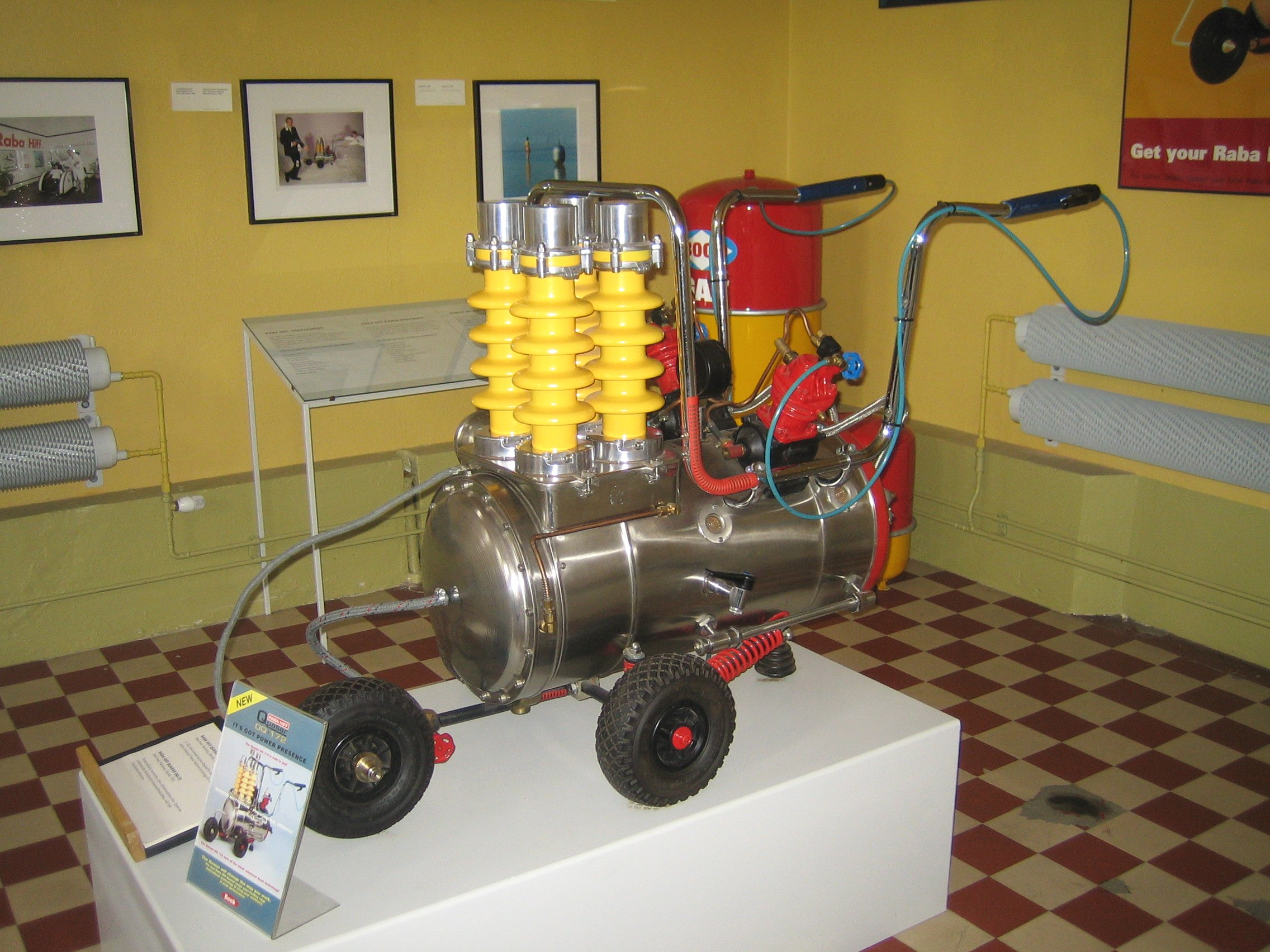
A Raba Hiff machine in Bonk Centre

Bonk Business Inc. is a fictional corporation created by Finnish artist and sculptor Alvar Gullichsen. The "products of Bonk Business" are absurd machines, such as the paranormal cannon, that have no apparent use, and which are built by Gullichsen. The story is that Bonk machines are powered by anchovy oil. The works parody corporate and marketing cliches in a retrofuturistic style.

In Uusikaupunki, there is a Bonk museum, where Bonk machines are displayed.

== See also ==
- Acme Corporation
- Bunab
