= Alvar Gullichsen =

Finnish painter and sculptor

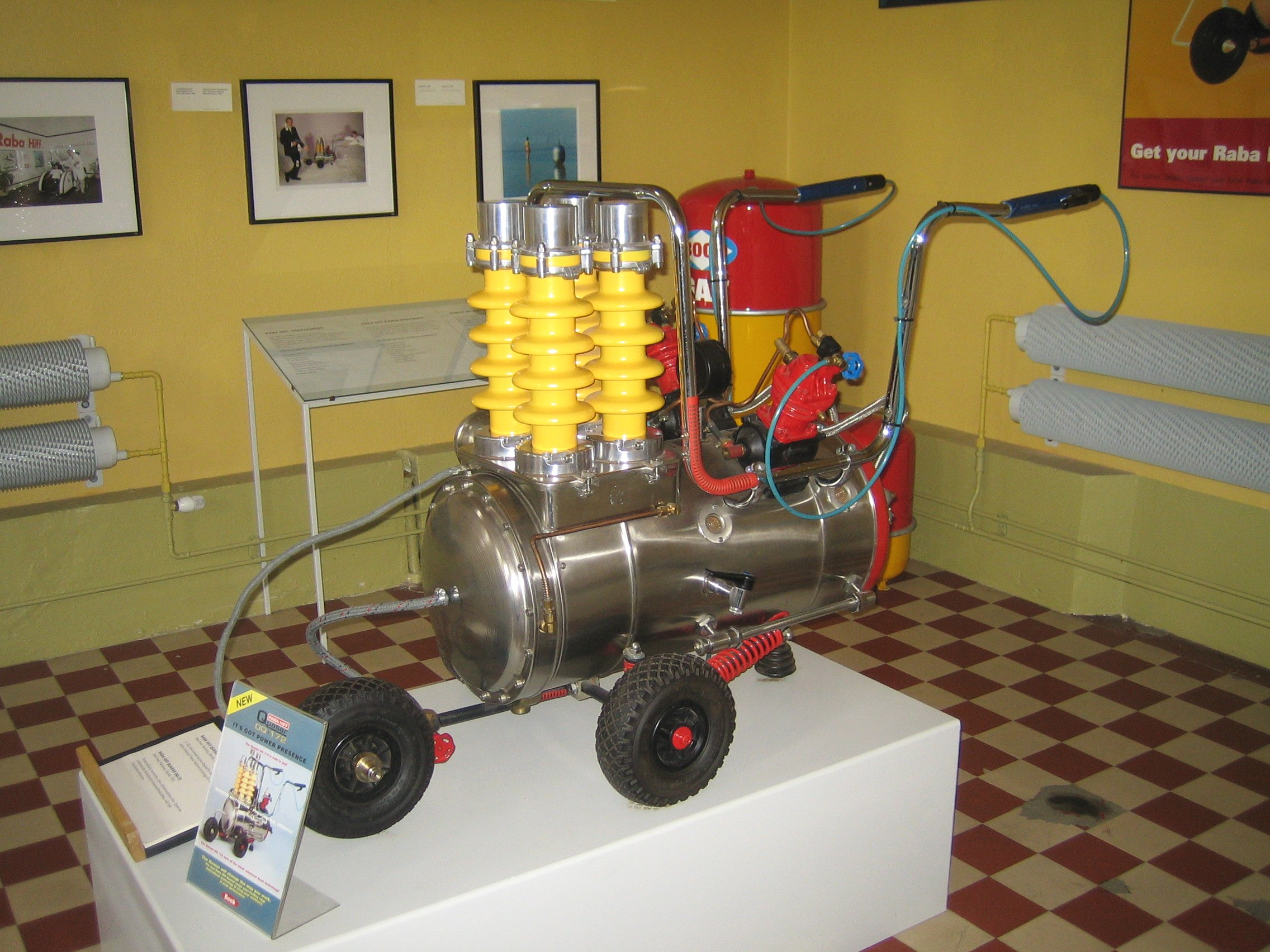
A Raba Hiff machine by Alvar Gullichsen, in Bonk Centre in Uusikaupunki

Alvar Gullichsen (born 1961 in Helsinki, Finland) is a Finnish painter and sculptor. He is most famous for his pop art works and the fictional corporation named Bonk Business which he founded. Gullichsen's works are often absurd machines with no apparent use. Alvar Gullichsen was the main designer of the interior of the night club Le Bonk in Helsinki.

Alvar Gullichsen is the son of Finnish architect Kristian Gullichsen and grandchild of art patron Maire Gullichsen.
