= Noormarkku =

- Former municipality
- Noormarkun kunta Norrmarks kommun
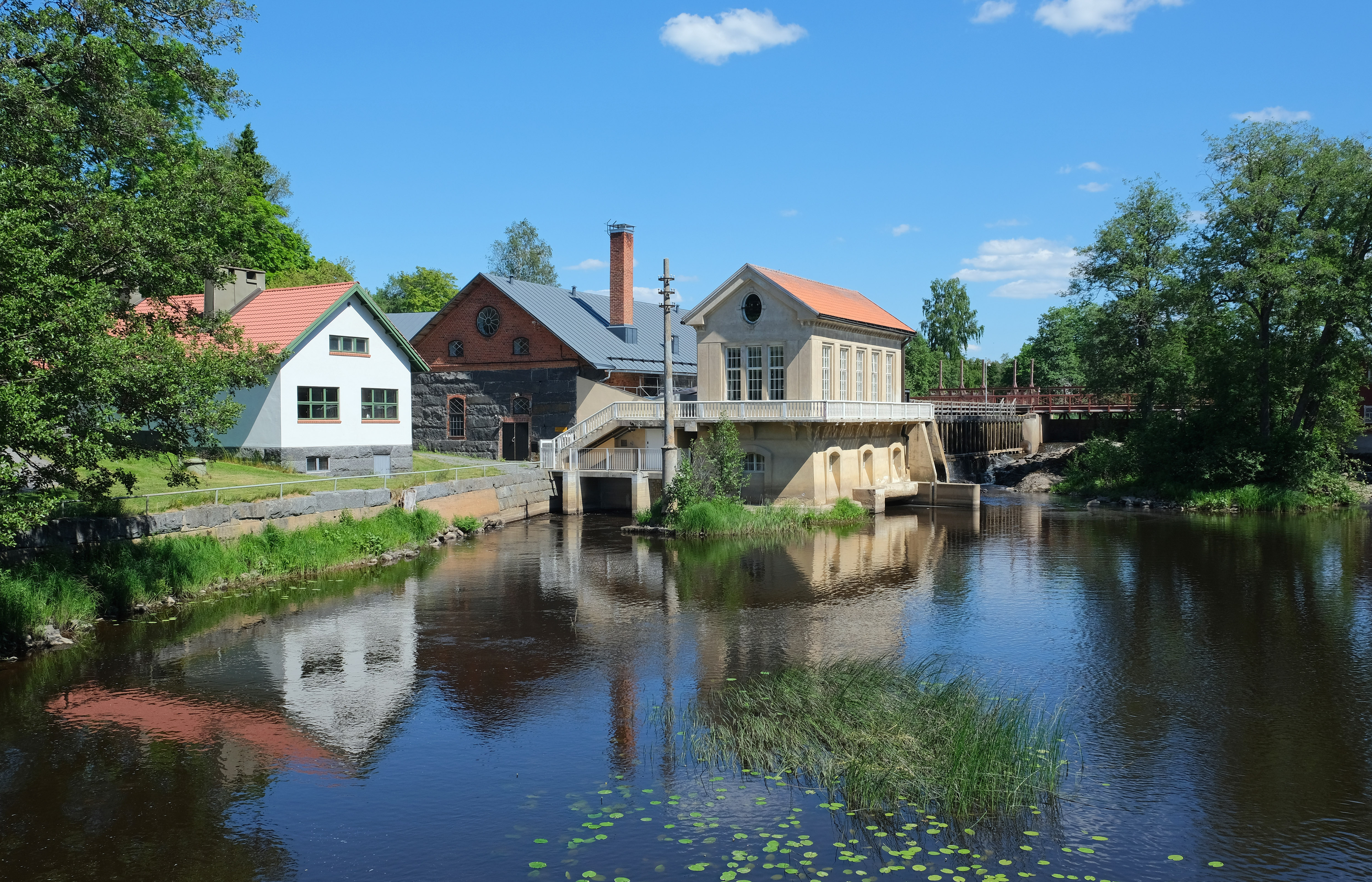
- Makkarakoski Power Plant in the Noormarkku Ironworks

- Coat of arms

- Location of Noormarkku in Finland
- Coordinates: 61°35.5′N 021°52′E
- Country: Finland
- Region: Satakunta
- Sub-region: Pori sub-region
- Consolidated: 2010

Government
  - Municipal manager: Risto Peevo

Area
  - Total: 332.06 km^{2} (128.21 sq mi)
  - Land: 316.86 km^{2} (122.34 sq mi)
  - Water: 15.2 km^{2} (5.9 sq mi)

Population (2009-12-31)
  - Total: 6,158
  - Density: 19.43/km^{2} (50.33/sq mi)
- Time zone: UTC+2 (EET)
  - Summer (DST): UTC+3 (EEST)
- Website: www.noormarkku.fi

Noormarkku (Swedish: Norrmark) is a former municipality of Finland.

It is located in the province of Western Finland and was part of the Satakunta region. The municipality had a population of 6,158 (31 December 2009) and covered an area of 332.06 square kilometres (128.21 sq mi) of which 15.2 km^{2} (5.9 sq mi) is water. The population density was 19.43 inhabitants per square kilometre (50.3/sq mi).

Noormarkku is the birthplace of the Ahlstrom Corporation. Antti Ahlström invested in the entire development of Noormarkku, setting up one of Finland's first Finnish language schools and building a road network.

The municipality was unilingually Finnish.

Noormarkku was annexed with the neighboring city of Pori on 1 January 2010.

A notable building is the Villa Mairea by architect Alvar Aalto designed as the private home for Maire and Harry Gullichsen.
