= Johan Gullichsen =

Finnish sailor (1936–2023)

Medal record

Sailing

Representing Finland

5.5 Metre World Championship
Silver medal – second place	2003 Bénodet	5.5m
Silver medal – second place	2005 Sydney	5.5m
Bronze medal – third place	2004 Torbole	5.5m

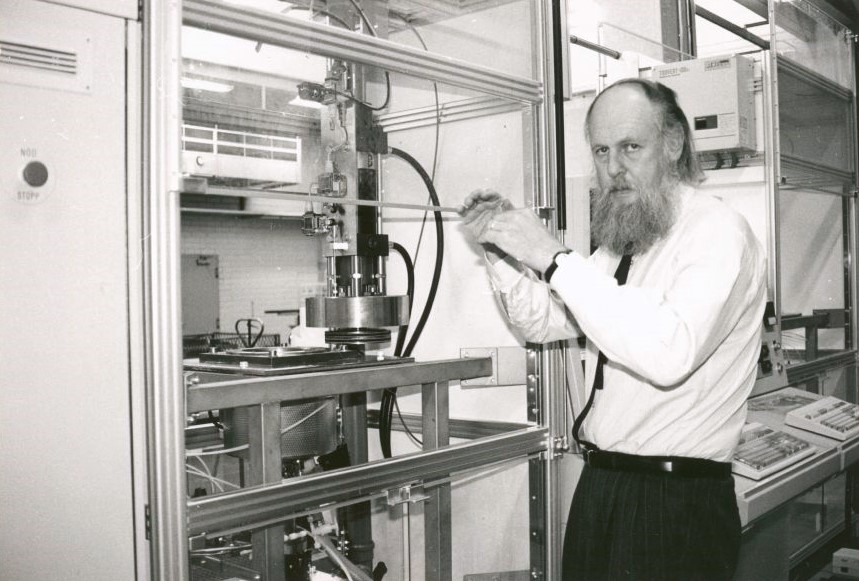
professor Gullischen

Johan Erik Gullichsen (28 June 1936 – 13 May 2023) was a Finnish paper engineer. From 1989 to 1999 he was professor for Pulping Technology at Helsinki University of Technology. He was also a sailor and competed in the 1964 Summer Olympics.

Johan Gullichsen was born in Porin maalaiskunta on 28 June 1936. A member of the Ahlström family, his mother was the Finnish art collector and patron Maire Gullichsen.

Gullichsen died on 13 May 2023, at the age of 86.
