= Antti Ahlström =

Finnish businessman

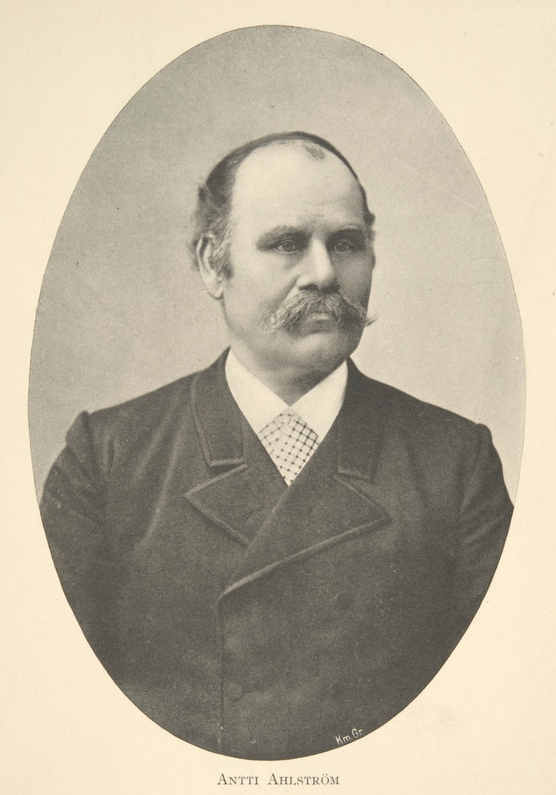
Ahlström in the early 1890s

Antti Ahlström (7 November 1827 – 10 May 1896) was a Finnish businessman, who founded Ahlstrom-Munksjö. He was one of Finland's influential and wealthy 19th-century businessman. In addition, Ahlström was an industrialist, ship owner, patron, commercial counselor and legislator.

== Biography ==
Ahlström was born on 7 November 1827, in Merikarvia, to Erkki Ahlström och Anna Norrgård. He was a socially active citizen, representing the bourgeoisie of the Town of Pori at the Diet of the Estates in 1877–1878 and in 1894. He was awarded the highly distinguished honorary title of Commercial Counsellor in 1881. Ahlström and his wife made considerable donations to public schools and to public education to further the national interest, and to the arts, for instance to the Finnish National Theatre and the Finnish National Opera. The Ahlströms were also patrons to several Finnish artists, including Akseli Gallen-Kallela.

Between 1866 and 1874, Ahlström's big business was shipping; he became the largest shipowner in Pori in 1871. It was in shipping that he earned the starting capital which he subsequently used to build his sawmill empire.

The purchase of the manor and iron works in Noormarkku in 1870 was a milestone in Ahlström's career: the purchase sealed his status as an important businessman and a 'lord of the manor'. One month after the deed of sale was signed, his wife Margaretha, whom he had married in December 1850, died of a sudden illness. In 1871, Antti Ahlström married again, this time to a woman 20 years his junior, Eva Holmström.

Ahlström's business grew rapidly through major acquisitions, such as the iron works in Kauttua, Leineperi and Strömfors and the sawmills in Haminaholma, Suursaari and Tampere.

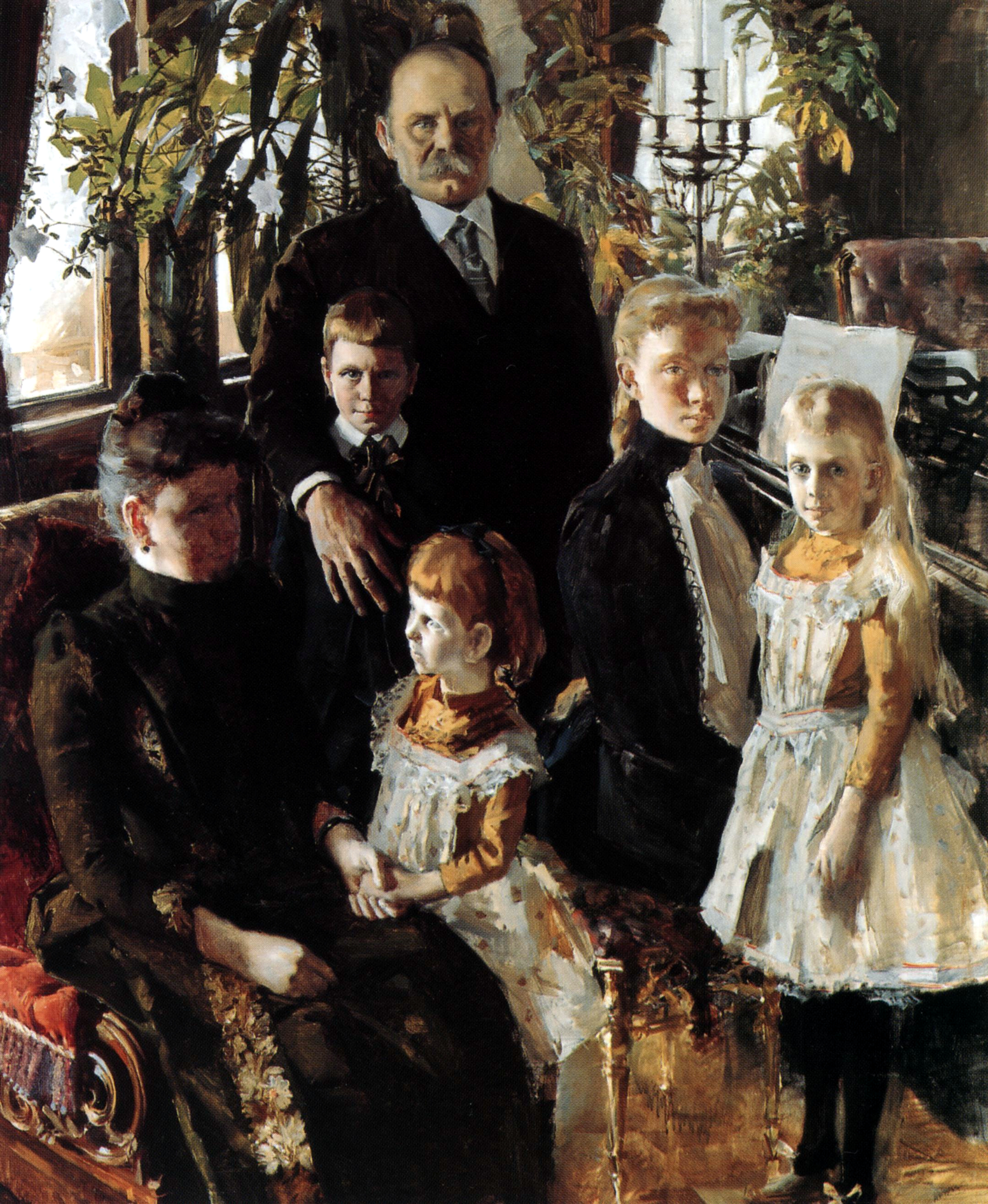
Ahlström with his family by Akseli Gallen-Kallela, 1890

When Ahlström died on 10 May 1896, aged 68, in Helsinki, he left behind 60,000 hectares of forest and a fortune estimated at 11.4 million Finnish markkas, which was Finland's largest at the time. Although difficult to estimate, this would likely be the equivalent of billions of Euro today. After his death, his wife Eva took over management of the company and in 1907 the company officially became a joint-stock company under the name A. Ahlström Osakeyhtiö. The company would later merge into Ahlstrom-Munksjö.

== See also ==
- Ahlstrom
