= Ahlstrom-Munksjö =

Finnish fiber company

Ahlstrom Oyj
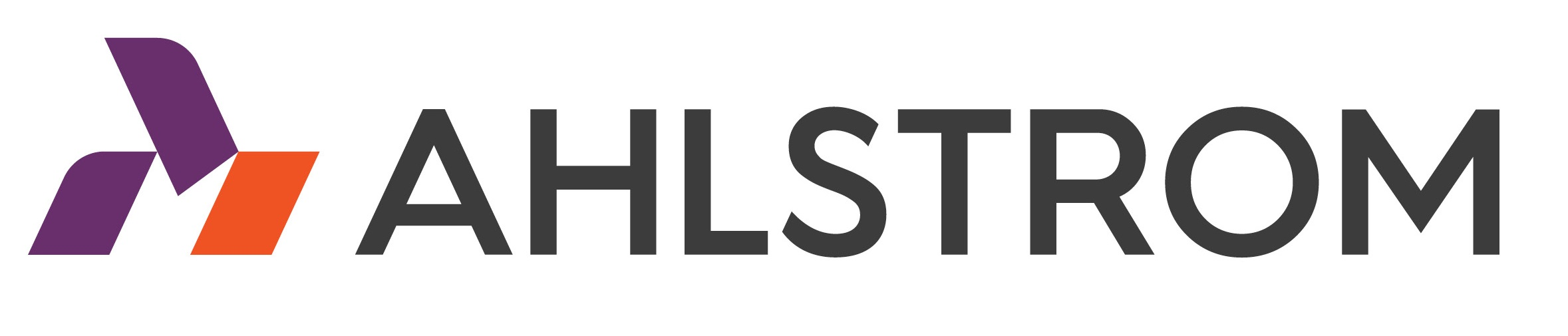
- Type: Private company
- Industry: Fiber-based materials, including nonwovens
- Founded: 1851
- Headquarters: Keilaranta 18, 02150, Espoo, Finland
- Area served: Worldwide
- Key people: Ivano Sessa (Chairman of the Board); Helen Mets (President and CEO)
- Products: Fiber-based materials for everyday applications such as filters, medical fabrics, life science and diagnostics, wallcoverings, energy storage, and food packaging.
- Revenue: ▲€2,900 million (2025)
- Number of employees: 7000 (2025)
- Website: https://www.ahlstrom.com/

Ahlstrom Oyj (previously Ahlstrom-Munksjö) is a manufacturer of fiber-based products. Renewable fibers represent about 95% of Ahlstrom's total fiber use. Ahlstrom operates in Europe, North and South America, and Asia. Most production sites are located in Europe and United States. The head office is located in Espoo, Finland.

Ahlstrom's customers represent several industries, including automotive construction, healthcare and life science, food and beverage and energy sectors. The company has some 7,000 employees worldwide and 36 production or converting facilities in 13 countries. The company's net sales in 2025 amounted to €2.9 billion. The company is led by Helen Mets, President and CEO.

== History ==
=== 1862–2016 ===
==== Munksjö ====
The creation of the Munksjö paper mill in 1862 was due to a chance meeting of two men: Janne Lundström, an inventor and industrialist from Jönköping, and Lars Johan Hierta, a prominent financier, publisher and politician.

==== Ahlstrom ====
Ahlstrom has its roots in Finland: the founder, Antti Ahlström, was one of Finland's most prominent 19th-century businessmen. The company was founded in 1851 and timber trading, shipping, and sawmill operations started to grow. The company focused on pulp, paper and timber production and machinery, later expanding to glassworks (Iittala and Karhula).

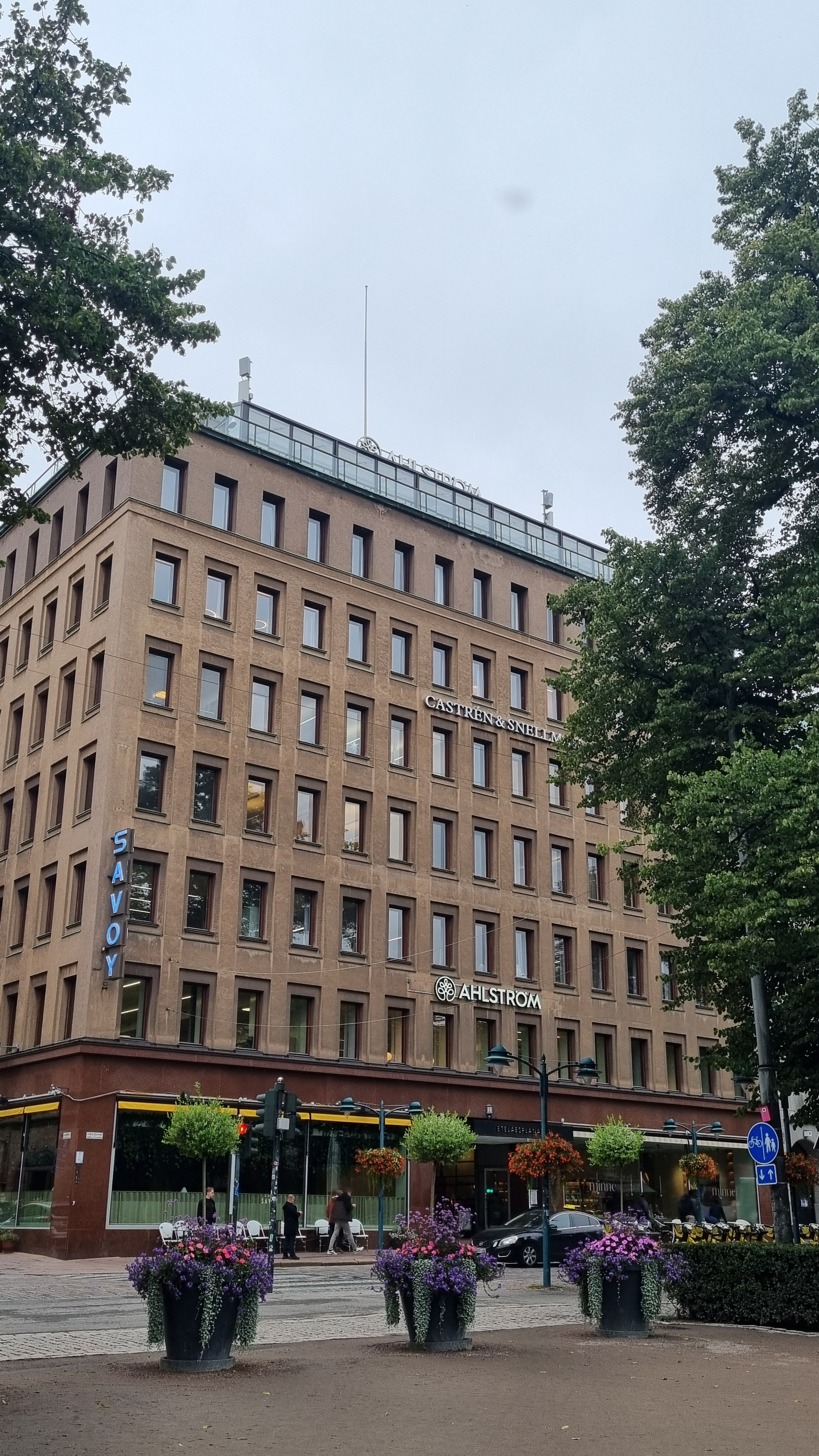
Headquarters of A. Ahlström Oy at Eteläesplanadi 14 in Helsinki. Constructed by Jung & Jung in 1937.

Ahlstrom's paper production began in Varkaus in 1921 on Europe's largest paper production machine. By the beginning of the 1930s, Ahlstrom had grown into Finland's largest industrial conglomerate. The outbreak of World War II led the company to convert much of its production to support the Finnish war effort. Following the war, the company played a major role in Finland's reconstruction and in its war reparations obligation. Ahlstrom alone accounted for nearly 15 percent of the country's total reparations. The company continued to expand into the 1950s, stepping up its engineering operations while also expanding into chemical wood processing technology.

Ahlstrom Corporation began to rapidly grow internationally in 1963, by acquiring a majority interest in a paper mill in Mathi close to Turin, Italy, that produced filter papers and rifle cartridge paper. This was the first significant international acquisition made by a Finnish company and made Ahlstrom a pioneer among major Finnish companies in internationalization. The town of Varkaus grew up around the A. Ahlström paper mills. In the 1930s, the Sunila Plant in Karhula (now Kotka), designed by Alvar Aalto, was built by Ahlström. In the 1980s, in a large swap of facilities, the Varkaus works were handed over to Enso Gutzeit (now Stora Enso).

During the 1980s, Ahlstrom left the newsprint and magazine paper market and focused its operations on specialty papers. One of the most profound decisions in Finnish industrial history was made in 1987, when Ahlstrom unexpectedly sold its paper-producing units. Leaving newsprint production increased the relative value of Ahlstrom's specialty paper and engineering units. In the 1990s, Ahlstrom expanded its focus to include nonwoven products. At the end of 1996, Ahlstrom Corporation continued its expansion by acquiring the French specialty paper and nonwovens producer Sibille-Dalle. During that same year, Ahlstrom Corporation established the Ahlstrom Paper Group to encompass the company's fiber-based materials operations.

In 2000, Ahlstrom acquired Dexter Corporation's nonwovens production facilities in the United States, Sweden and the United Kingdom. Recently, Ahlstrom is among the largest Nordic companies. The Ahlström family are still significant shareholders in the Ahlstrom Corporation. In 2001, the group split into three companies. The manufacturing divisions were transferred to the now public Ahlstrom Corporation. Ahlstrom Capital Oy was established as a private investment company. And A.Ahlstrom Osakeyhtio was established as a private forestry and real estate management company.

In October 2005, Professor Johan Erik Gullichsen, chairman of Ahlstrom Corporation, was inducted into the Paper Industry International Hall of Fame for his innovations in the processing of pulp fiber suspensions at medium consistency. In 2012, Ahlstrom Corporation announced that its Label and Processing business area will be combined with Munksjö Group. In 2016, Ahlstrom Corporation and Munksjö Oyj announced a plan to merge the two companies.

=== 2017–10/2022 ===
==== Ahlstrom-Munksjö ====
In 2017, Ahlstrom sold its Osnabruck, Germany plant to Kammerer. The completion of the merger of Ahlstrom Corporation into Munksjö Oyj was registered with the Finnish Trade Register on 1 April 2017. Following the completion of the merger, the name of the combined company has changed to Ahlstrom-Munksjö Oyj (“Ahlstrom-Munksjö”). Trading in the new Ahlstrom-Munksjö shares issued to Ahlstrom's shareholders as merger consideration commenced 1 April 2017 on the Nasdaq Helsinki (trading code: AM1) and Nasdaq Stockholm (trading code: AM1S) stock exchanges. In 2018, Ahlstrom-Munksjö acquired U.S. based Expera Specialty Solutions and Brazilian Caieiras specialty paper mill.

In September 2020, it was reported that a consortium consisting of Ahlström Capital, funds managed by Bain Capital, and Viknum and Belgrano Inversiones has submitted a cash purchase offer for all Ahlstrom-Munksjö Oyj's shares. In 2021, a consortium consisting of Ahlström Capital, funds managed by Bain Capital as well as Viknum and Belgrano Inversiones completed a tender offer for all shares in Ahlstrom-Munksjö. Ahlstrom-Munksjö became a privately held company (Ahlstrom-Munksjö Holding) and its shares were delisted from Nasdaq Helsinki and Nasdaq Stockholm.

=== 11/2022–now ===
==== Ahlstrom ====
In 2022, Ahlstrom-Munksjö divested its Decor business to a newly formed Swedish company named Munksjö AB. Following the ownership reorganization, the company renamed itself as Ahlstrom, with a renewed logo where the symbol remains the same and the name is changed to Ahlstrom. Helen Mets was appointed as President and CEO of Ahlstrom in December 2022

== PFAS Contamination ==
Ahlstrom is currently linked to PFAS soil- and water-contamination in different countries.

In the US, after sites inspections found PFAS levels more than 3 times those typically seen in soil, groundwater and sediments, The Wisconsin Department of Natural Resources sent what are known as “responsible party” letters to the Rhinelander mill’s current owner Ahlstrom Rhinelander LLC and Ahlstrom NA Specialty Solutions LLC. The DNR also named the mill’s former owner Wausau Paper Corp., Wausau Paper Mills LLC and Essity North America as responsible parties. The DNR has previously found contaminated wells in Stella, Wisconsin have some of the highest PFAS levels in the country, pointing the risk of drinking tap water in the area. Ahlstrom launches bottled water program after state regulators named it among companies tied to PFAS contamination.

In France similar contaminations with levels more than 6 times higher to what legislations allows are alike linked back to paper mills owned by Ahlstrom. This leads as well to a ground water consumption ban for large areas. PFAS from the paper mills are found in soils, water, fishes and even human blood samples according to investigations.

== Business areas ==
Ahlstrom manages a broad platform of businesses, focusing on three core segments, Filtration & Life Sciences, Food & Consumer Packaging, Protective Materials, and one cluster, Performance materials.

== Global operations ==
Ahlstrom products are developed and produced in 13 countries, with 36 plants and a global sales network. The headquarter office is in Espoo, Finland.

== See also ==
- Ahlström — Gullichsen family
- Forest industry in Finland
- List of Finnish companies
