= Mickle =

Mickle may refer to:

== Geographical features ==
- Mickle Ditch, six-mile long linear earthwork in Greater Manchester, England
- Mickle Fell, mountain in the Pennines, England
- Mickle Island, southeast of Flagstaff Point, west of Ross Island, Antarctica
- Mickle Mere, nature reserve south of Ixworth in Suffolk, England
- Mickle Trafford, village in Cheshire, England

== Surname ==
- Alan D. Mickle (1882–1969), Australian writer of essays and verse
- Andrew H. Mickle (1805–63), Mayor of New York from 1846 to 1847
- Charles Mickle, (1849–1910), Canadian politician
- Jim Mickle (born 1979), American film director and writer
- Kim Mickle (born 1984), Australian javelin thrower
- Robert Mickle (1925–2009), American city planner and community leader
- Stephan P. Mickle (1944–2021), American lawyer and judge
- William Julius Mickle (1735–1788), Scottish poet
- William Julius Mickle (physician) (1845–1917), Canadian-British medical doctor

== Given name ==
- Arthur William Mickle Ellis (1883–1966), British-Canadian physician, pathologist, Regius Professor of Medicine at the University of Oxford 1943–1948
- Walter Mickle Smith (1867–1953), civil engineer who worked primarily on U.S. dams and waterway projects
- Kathryn Mickle Werdegar (born 1936), former Associate Justice of the Supreme Court of California
- John Mickle Whitall (1800–1877), US sea captain, businessman and philanthropist in New Jersey and Pennsylvania

== See also ==
- Mickel
- Micle
- Mikel
- Mikell (disambiguation)
- Mykle
