= Mikl =

Mikl may refer to:

- Mikl.-Maclay or Nicholas Miklouho-Maclay (1846–1888), Russian explorer, ethnologist, anthropologist and biologist
- Josef Mikl (1929–2008), Austrian abstract painter of the Informal style
- Mikl, a musician in the band Brokencyde
- Johanna Mikl-Leitner (born 1964), Austrian politician of the ÖVP
- Jon Mikl Thor (born 1953), bodybuilding champion, actor, songwriter, screenwriter, historian, vocalist and musician

== See also ==
- Meikle (disambiguation)
- Meikles
- Mickel
- Mickle
- Mihkel
- Mikal (disambiguation)
- Mikel
- Mikkel
