= Munapirtti =

Munapirtti (Swedish: Mogenpört) may refer to:

- Munapirtti (island)
- Munapirtti (village)

both situated in the municipality of Pyhtää in Southern Finland.
