= Meikle =

Meikle may refer to:

People:

- Adrian Meikle, Welsh curler
- Andrea Meikle (née Crowther) (born 1963), former association football player who represented New Zealand at international level
- Andrew Meikle (1719–1811), Scottish mechanical engineer credited with inventing the threshing machine
- Andrew Meikle Bryan (1893–1988), Scottish mining engineer
- Carola Ivena Meikle (née Dickinson), British algologist, or anaesthetist with speciality training in pain management
- George Meikle Kemp (1795–1844), Scottish carpenter/joiner, draughtsman, and self-taught architect
- Hugh Meikle (1940–2016), Welsh curler and coach
- Izzy Meikle-Small (born 1996), British actress who has appeared in feature films and TV shows
- Jamie Meikle, Welsh curler
- Jeffrey L. Meikle, American cultural historian
- John James Meikle (1845–1937), New Zealand farmer and litigant
- John Meikle VC MM (1898–1918), Scottish World War I recipient of the Victoria Cross
- John Meikle (Saskatchewan politician) (1870–1964), Scottish-born farmer and political figure in Saskatchewan
- Lindon Meikle (born 1988), English professional footballer
- Orde Meikle (born 1964), member of DJ duo Slam, with Stuart MacMillan (born 1966); co-founders of Soma Quality Recordings
- Richard Meikle (1929–1991), Australian actor who worked in film, theatre, film and radio
- Robert Desmond Meikle (1923–2021), Irish botanist from the Royal Botanic Gardens, Kew
- Robert Greenshields Meikle (1830–1887), merchant and political figure in Quebec
- Ryan Meikle (born 1996), English professional darts player
- Sam Meikle (born 1971), Australian writer and director best known for his work in television
- Thomas Meikle (1861–1939), Scottish-born businessman and pioneer in Rhodesia

Places:

- Meikle Auchengree, hamlet near Kilbirnie and Longbar in North Ayrshire, Scotland
- Meikle Bin, peak in the Kilsyth Hills in Scotland
- Meikle Carewe Hill, landform in Aberdeenshire, Scotland in the Mounth Range of the Grampian Mountains
- Meikle Earnock, medium-sized suburb in the south of Hamilton, Scotland
- Meikle Loch, in Aberdeenshire, North East Scotland
- Meikle Millyea, a mountain in South West Scotland
- Meikle Pap, a mountain in North East Scotland
- Meikle Says Law in the Lammermuir Hills (An Lomair Mòr in Gaelic) in southern Scotland
- Meikle Wartle, small rural village in north-east of Scotland
- Meikle Day, 10th October National Meikle Day, folklore character of Scotland

== See also ==
- Meike (disambiguation)
- Meikles
- Meile (disambiguation)
- Mikl (disambiguation)
