= Zacoccia =

King of Mozambique

Zacoccia was a king of Mozambique who, according to the Lusiad, welcomed Vasco da Gama believing him to be a Muslim. Upon discovering that Vasco da Gama was a Christian he conceived to have him killed. When the agent he employed failed, he committed suicide.
