= Wickel =

Wickel is a surname. Notable people with the surname include:

- Harrison Wickel (1912–1989), American baseball player, manager, and scout
- Ralph James Wickel (1921–2001), American tennis player

== See also ==
- Mickel
