= Mickels =

Mickels is a name. Notable people with the name include:

- Gustaf Mickels (1879-1949), Finnish politician
- Joy-Lance Mickels (born 1994), Rwandan footballer
- Joy-Slayd Mickels (born 1994), Rwandan footballer
- Leroy-Jacques Mickels (born 1995), Rwandan footballer
- Mickels Réa (born 1983), French singer-songwriter

== See also ==
- Mickel
