= Luso =

Luso may refer to:

- Luso (Mealhada), a civil parish in the municipality of Mealhada, Portugal
- Luis Eduardo Delgado (born 1984), Spanish footballer commonly known as Luso
- Luso Clemens, the protagonist in the video game Final Fantasy Tactics A2: Grimoire of the Rift
- A prefix meaning relating to Portugal or Portuguese (after the Roman province of Lusitania, corresponding to part of modern Portugal)

== See also ==
- Lusus
