= Battle of Ahvenkoski =

1918 battle of the Finnish Civil War

Coordinates: 60.497773°N 26.459595°E

- Part of the Finnish Civil War and Eastern Front in World War I
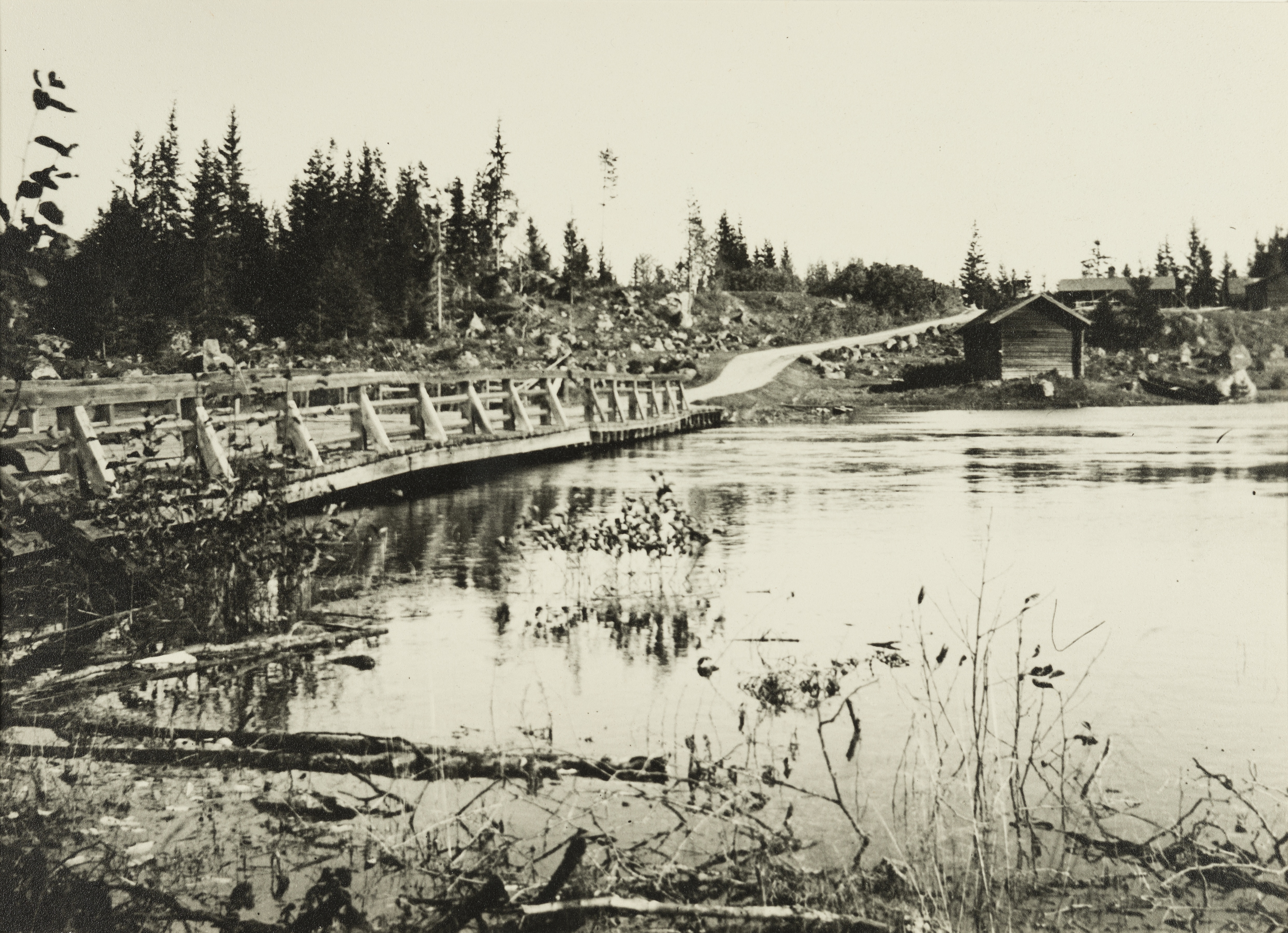
- The fixed Rajasilta ("border bridge") after the battle
Date	10 April – 5 May 1918 (3 weeks and 4 days)
Location	Ahvenkoski, Finland
Result	German–White victory
Territorial changes	Surrender of Red Finland

Belligerents
German Empire; Finnish Whites	Red Finland

Commanders and leaders
(German Empire) Otto von Brandenstein	Oskar Vinte (executed)

Strength
800	800–900

Casualties and losses
at least 13 killed	at least 13 killed

The Battle of Ahvenkoski was fought during the Finnish Civil War between 10 April and 5 May 1918 at Ahvenkoski (Swedish: Abborfors; lit. 'perch rapids'), Finland between the German Empire and the Red Guards (Finnish: punakaartit) of the Finnish Socialist Workers' Republic, more commonly known as Red Finland. For most of the battle both sides occupied trenches along the Kymi river. Ahvenkoski and the surrounding Kymi valley region were the last strongholds of the Reds. The battle ended with the surrender of the last of the Red Guards on 5 May, which ended the war with White Finland and Germany defeating Red Finland.

== German campaign begins ==
The German Empire supported White Finland, the precursor of the modern Finnish state, during the civil war against Red Finland and its paramilitary army, the Red Guards. Thus, Germany launched a military campaign in southeast Finland on 7 April 1918 with the landing of Detachment Brandenstein (German: Abteilung-Brandenstein) in Loviisa. Their goal was to take the coastal town of Kotka situated 40 kilometres (25 mi) east of Loviisa, then move north along the vital Saint Petersburg railway to the railway junction of Kouvola. The next morning, a 300-soldier reconnaissance unit reached the outskirts of Kotka, but was stopped in the Battle of Kyminlinna.

As the Germans waited for reinforcements, they tapped enemy telephone lines and mistakenly believed that the Red Guards had a reserve of 10,000–30,000 soldiers heading to Kotka from the northern Kymi valley region. In reality the Reds were strengthened by only 450 men. The German unit retreated to Ahvenkoski, 20 km (12 mi) east of Kotka. As they were soon followed by the Reds, they moved 8 km (5.0 mi) further west, where they dug into defensive positions by the Taasianjoki river. The Reds did not advance past Ahvenkoski, where they occupied 18th-century fortifications by the Kymi river. They were soon reinforced by units who had retreated from the Karelian front.

== Battle at Ahvenkoski ==
The next ten days were quiet, as the fighting was focused north of Loviisa in the Eastern Uusimaa region. On 22 April the Germans moved up to Ahvenkoski and attacked the next morning. The battle lasted two days, but the Germans were not able to break through the Red lines. On 25 April, the Reds left their positions on the western side of the Kymi river and retreated across it, destroying bridges behind them. The Germans occupied the trenches on the western side of the Kymi river, and the battle paused for the next eight days.

The Reds' front in Karelia collapsed after the Battle of Vyborg (Finnish: Viipuri) on 29 April and they suffered a decisive loss at the Battle of Lahti. This meant that the Kymi valley region was now the last Red stronghold. A ceasefire was established on 3 May, and the parties started negotiations for a Red surrender.

== Red Finland surrenders ==
The Reds in Kymenlaakso started surrendering on 4 May, first in the village of Inkeroinen in Anjalankoski. The same evening the Whites entered Kotka, where 4,000 Reds surrendered with hardly any resistance. The last Reds left were now the 800–900 fighters in Ahvenkoski. The negotiations in Ahvenkoski were mediated by foreign representatives based in Kotka. The Red delegation was led by Juho Kaven, a 24-year-old carpenter from Malmi, Helsinki. The Finnish Whites demanded an unconditional surrender, but according to the agreement concluded with the Germans, the individual soldiers were to be released and only the leaders made prisoners. The Reds were to surrender their weapons by 6 p.m. on 5 May at the latest.

The surrender became effective at midday of 5 May, as 800 Reds marched behind their commander Oskar Vinter towards the German lines on the western bank of the Kymi river. After crossing the Rajasilta ("border bridge"), they surrendered their weapons. Despite the agreement, the Red fighters were not released. After capturing the Reds, the Whites separated the staff members, platoon leaders and trade union activists from the crowd, and took them to the Svartholm fortress, where they were immediately shot. The rest were kept overnight in the Vähä-Ahvenkoski village, and then transported to various White prison camps in Southern Finland. The following week, the Whites executed nearly 300 Reds in Kymi valley.

== Aftermath ==
According to a list of Germans who were killed in action during the war, at least 13 Germans died during the attack of 22 and 23 April. According to a Finnish casualty database, at least 13 Reds died during the battle within the Pyhtää municipality. Seven Germans were buried in Ahvenkoski Cemetery, as well as an unknown number of Reds. A memorial on the Red mass grave was erected in 1946. In September 2013, a memorial to the end of the Civil War was unveiled at the site where the last Reds surrendered. The Battle of Ahvenkoski was the last action of the Civil War, but the White Army Commander-in-Chief C. G. E. Mannerheim did not declare the war over until 16 May, when the Russians had left Fort Ino near Petrograd.
