= Västerby =

Västerby may refer to:

- Västerby, Finland (Finnish: Länsikylä), a village in Pyhtää, Kymenlaakso Region
- Västerby, Sweden, a locality in Hedemora, Dalarna County
