= C. O. Frietsch =

Finnish consul general

Carl Olof (Ole, C.O.) Frietsch (24 March 1901 – 19 August 1973) was the Finnish consul general and the MP from the Swedish People's Party.

Frietsch was born in Prague, Czechoslovakia. His parents were Karl Gustaf Frietsch, a qualified engineer, and Eva Lönnblad. He graduated in 1920 and then studied at the Kiel University, where he graduated as a doctoral student in 1926.

Frietsch served as an official of the Nordic Union Bank in Helsinki in 1927–1937 and as a procurator of the bank from 1935 to 1937. He was the advisor for co-operative Varuboden from 1937 to 1940 and the head of the sales office of Uusimaa in 1941–1945.

Frietsch was also served as the secretary of the Kontorsvärlden newspaper in 1933–1935 and as editor-in-chief from 1935 to 1937 and editor-in-chief of Vi och vårt 1937–1945.

After the war, Frietsch was a newsreader at the Embassy of Finland in Stockholm from 1946 to 1948, as Secretary of State in Stockholm from 1948 to 1950, and from 1953 to 1956, as Secretary of State in Oslo and Copenhagen from 1948 to 1950, and as Secretary of State in Washington, 1950–1953.

Finland's permanent representative at the Vienna headquarters of the United Nations in and chargé d'affaires in Vienna 1957–1961 and last consul general in Hamburg 1961–1965.

Frietsch was a member of the Parliament from the Swedish People's Party between 1936 and 1945 representing the constituency of Uusimaa. Frietsch moved to a branch office in Stockholm in December 1945 and replaced by Henrik Kullberg in the Swedish People's Party.

Frietsch chaired the Parliamentary Banking Committee, belonged to the Finnish Broadcasting Company's supervisory board and the board of directors of the Social Insurance Institution. He was also chairman of the Finnish-American Association, the Finnish branch of the Swedish branch office and the Swedish Banking Association of Finland.

Frietsch was a member of the peace opposition during the Continuation War. During the war, he was also a member of the Parliamentary Foreign Affairs Committee. In 1945, he published a piece of work devoted to war-related politics Finlands ödesår 1939–1943

Frietsch was married from 1927 to 1964 to Anna Liesbeth Hollen. In 1965 he married Leni Hanna Magda Maria Delwall. He died, aged 72, in Malles, Val Venosta, South Tyrol, Italy.
