= Tuuski =

Village in Finland

Coordinates: 60°24′18.92″N 26°32′44.09″E

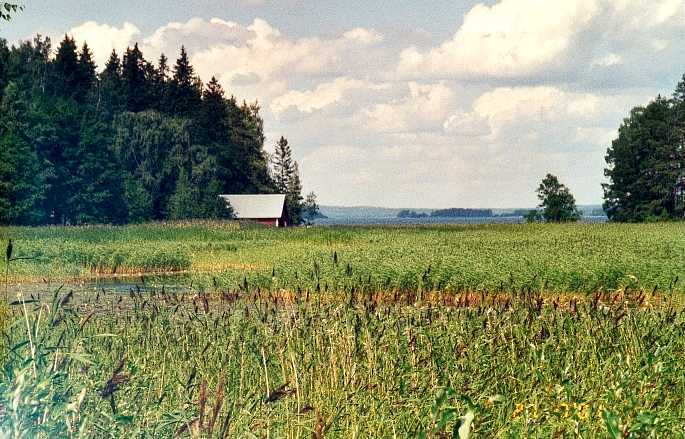
A view over the bay of Österviken

Tuuski (Swedish: Tuskas) is a place on the island of Munapirtti in the municipality of Pyhtää, Kymenlaakso, Southern Finland. It is part of Munapirtti village.
