= Munapirtti (island) =

Coordinates: 60.415°N 26.58°E

Munapirtti (Swedish: Mogenpört) is an island in the municipality of Pyhtää, Finland.

== Villages ==
- Hinkaböle
- Malm
- Munapirtti
- Tuuski
