= Malmi, Pyhtää =

Village in municipality of Pyhtää, Finland

Coordinates: 60°25′50.73″N 26°35′13.97″E

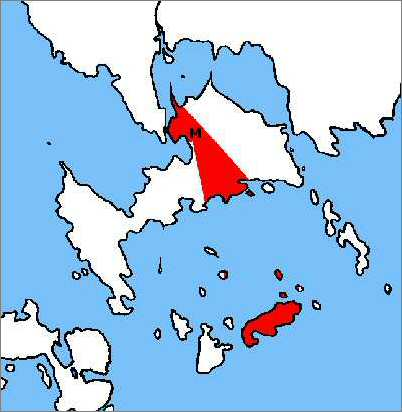
Map of the village

Malmi (Swedish: Malm) is a village on the island of Munapirtti in the municipality of Pyhtää, Kymenlaakso, Southern Finland.
