= Ruotsinpyhtää =

Ruotsinpyhtää Ruotsinpyhtää (Finnish) Strömfors (Swedish)
- Former municipality
- Ruotsinpyhtään kunta Strömfors kommun
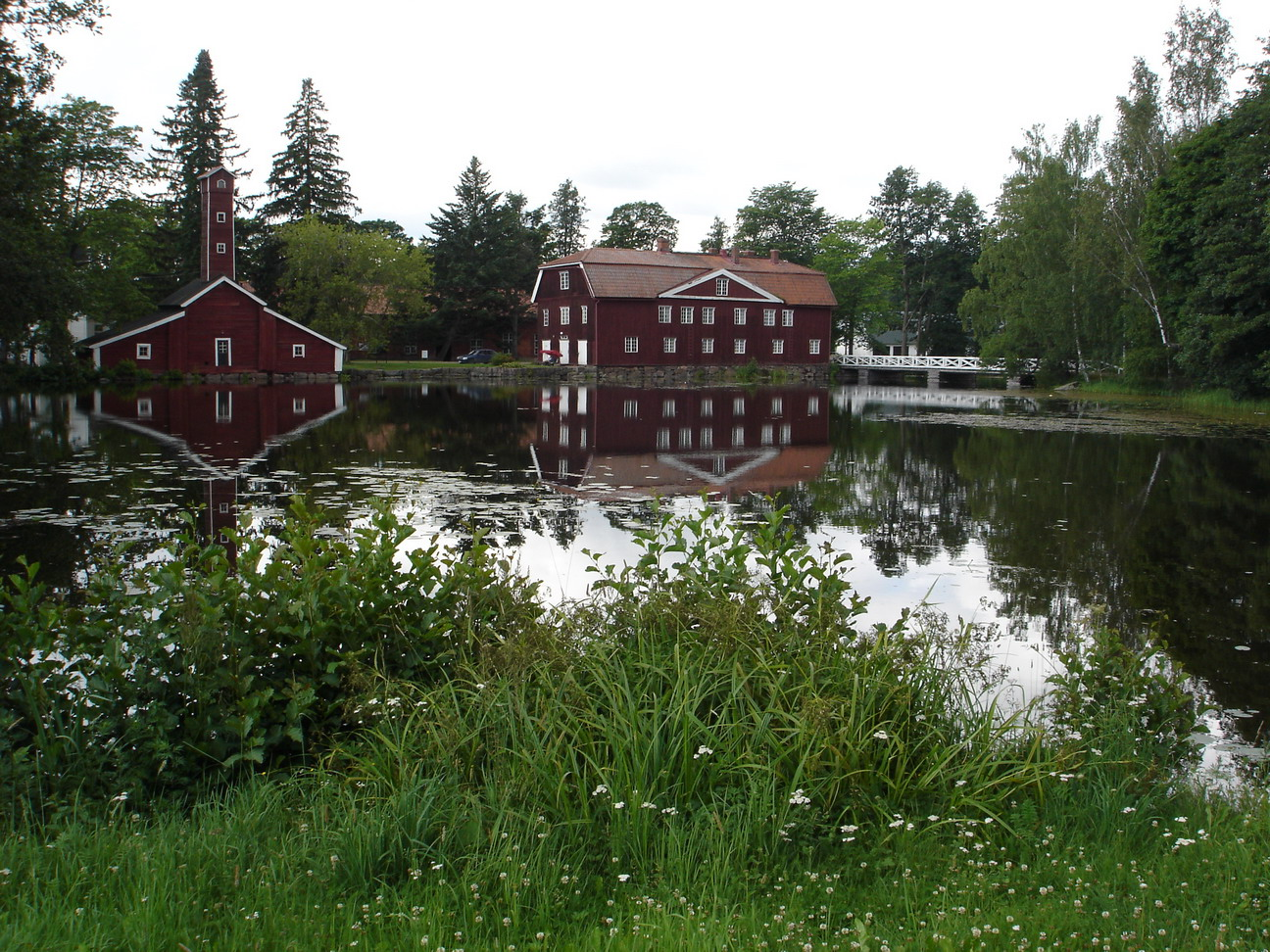
- Old buildings of the Strömfors Iron works

- Coat of arms

- Location of Ruotsinpyhtää in Finland
- Coordinates: 60°31.5′N 026°28′E
- Country: Finland
- Region: Uusimaa
- Sub-region: Loviisa sub-region
- Charter: 1743
- Consolidated: 2010

Government
  - Municipal manager: Risto Nieminen

Area
  - Total: 470.03 km^{2} (181.48 sq mi)
  - Land: 276.67 km^{2} (106.82 sq mi)
  - Water: 193.36 km^{2} (74.66 sq mi)

Population (2009-12-31)
  - Total: 2,893

Population by age
  - 0 to 14: %
  - 15 to 64: %
  - 65 or older: %
- Time zone: UTC+2 (EET)
  - Summer (DST): UTC+3 (EEST)
- Climate: Dfb
- Website: www.ruotsinpyhtaa.fi

Ruotsinpyhtää (Finnish pronunciation: [ˈruo̯tsimˌpyhtæː]; Swedish: Strömfors) is a former municipality of Finland. Ruotsinpyhtää, Pernå and Liljendal were consolidated to Loviisa on January 1, 2010.

It is located in the province of Southern Finland and was part of the Eastern Uusimaa region (now Uusimaa). The municipality had a population of 2,893 (December 31, 2009) and covered an area of 470.03 square kilometres (181.48 sq mi) of which 193.36 km^{2} (74.66 sq mi) is water. The population density was 10.46 inhabitants per square kilometre (27.1/sq mi).

The municipality was bilingual, with majority being Finnish and minority Swedish speakers.

== History ==
The area of Ruotsinpyhtää was originally part of Pyhtää. After the Treaty of Åbo in 1743 the border between Sweden and Russian Empire was drawn on the Ahvenkoski rapid, dividing Pyhtää between the two states. Due to this the western side became known as Ruotsinpyhtää (Swedish Pyhtää). In 1744 Jakob Forsell (later af Forselles) and Anders Nohrström bought the local ironworks, which was renamed Strömfors after their surnames. In 1817 Strömfors became the official Swedish name for the municipality.

The Ruotsinpyhtää church was built in 1771 from wood. The church was renovated in 1898 to its current Gothic Revival appearance.

== People born in Ruotsinpyhtää ==
- Carl Axel Gottlund (1796–1875)
- Gustaf Mickels (1879–1949)
- Henrik Kullberg (1891–1953)
- Sylvi Siltanen (1909–1986)
- Pamela Tola (1981–)
- Toni Lindberg (1985–)

== See also ==
- Virginia af Forselles
