= Hinkaböle =

Village in Finland

Coordinates: 60°25′16.31″N 26°34′58.7″E

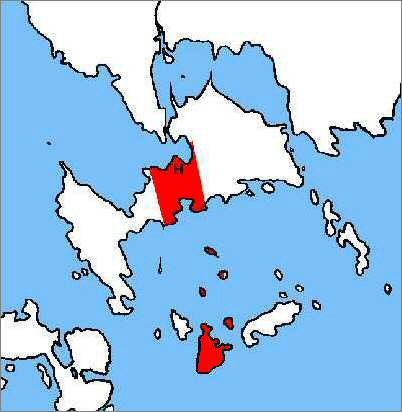
Map

Hinkaböle (Finnish: Hinkapyöli) is a village on the island of Munapirtti in the municipality of Pyhtää, Kymenlaakso, Finland.
