= The Old Man of Restelo =

Fictional character in a poem by Camões

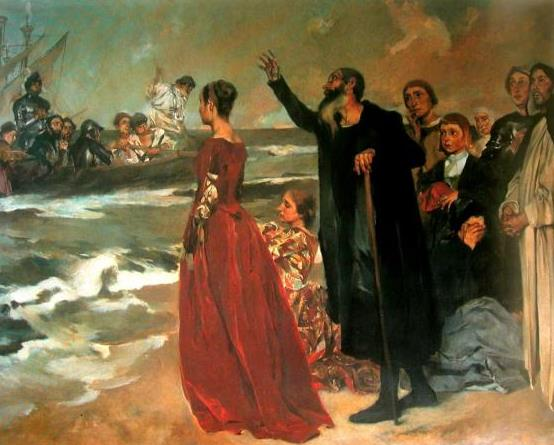
The Old Man of Restelo (1904), by Columbano Bordalo Pinheiro at the Military Museum in Lisbon.

The Old Man of Restelo (Portuguese: Velho do Restelo), also known as the Old Man of Bélem, is a fictional character introduced by the Portuguese epic poet Luís de Camões in Canto IV of his epic poem Os Lusíadas (The Lusiads). The Old Man of Restelo is interpreted in different ways as a symbol of pessimism, or as representing those who did not believe in the likely success of the then upcoming Portuguese Discoveries. The character appears at the departure of the first expedition to India (1497), giving warnings about the odyssey that was about to happen.

== The Old Man's speech ==
This episode begins at the outset of the voyage of Vasco da Gama across unknown oceans. An old man (the Old Man of Restelo) goes down denounce the voyages and the occupants of the ships, arguing that the reckless navigators, driven by greed for fame, glory, and riches, are courting disaster for themselves and the Portuguese people.

This is the argument of the Old Man of Restelo against the voyage that Vasco da Gama and his crew were about to undertake:

94 "But now an agèd Sire of reverend mien, upon the foreshore thronged by the crowd, with eyne fast fixt upon our forms was seen, and discontented thrice his brow he bow'd: His deep toned accents raising somewhat keen, that we from shipboard hear him speak aloud, with lore by long experience only grown, thus from his time-taught breast he made his moan — 95 "'Oh craving of Command! Oh vain Desire! of vainest van'ity man miscalleth Fame! Oh fraudulent gust, so easy fanned to fire by breath of vulgar, aping Honour's name! What just and dreadful judgment deals thine ire, to seely souls who overlove thy claim! What deaths, what direful risks, what agonies wherewith thou guerd'onest them, thy fitting prize!	96 "'Thou dour disturber of man's sprite and life, fount of backsliding and adultery, sagacious waster, and consummate thief of subjects, kingdoms, treasure, empery: They hail thee noble, and they hail thee chief, though digne of all indignities thou be; they call thee Fame and Glory sovereign, words, words, the heart of silly herd to gain! 97 "'What new disaster dost thou here design? What horror for our realm and race invent? What unheard dangers or what deaths condign, veiled by some name that soundeth excellent? What bribe of gorgeous reign, and golden mine, whose ready offer is so rarely meant? What Fame hast promised them? what pride of story? What palms? what triumphs? what victorious glory?

Os Lusíadas, Canto IV, 94-97: Burton's translation (1880)

Portuguese original

94 Mas um velho, de aspecto venerando, Que ficava nas praias, entre a gente, Postos em nós os olhos, meneando Três vezes a cabeça, descontente, A voz pesada um pouco alevantando, Que nós no mar ouvimos claramente, C'um saber só de experiências feito, Tais palavras tirou do experto peito: 95 — "Ó glória de mandar! Ó vã cobiça Desta vaidade, a quem chamamos Fama! Ó fraudulento gosto, que se atiça C'uma aura popular, que honra se chama! Que castigo tamanho e que justiça Fazes no peito vão que muito te ama! Que mortes, que perigos, que tormentas, Que crueldades neles experimentas!	96 — "Dura inquietação d'alma e da vida, Fonte de desamparos e adultérios, Sagaz consumidora conhecida De fazendas, de reinos e de impérios: Chamam-te ilustre, chamam-te subida, Sendo digna de infames vitupérios; Chamam-te Fama e Glória soberana, Nomes com quem se o povo néscio engana! 97 — "A que novos desastres determinas De levar estes reinos e esta gente? Que perigos, que mortes lhe destinas Debaixo dalgum nome preminente? Que promessas de reinos, e de minas D'ouro, que lhe farás tão facilmente? Que famas lhe prometerás? que histórias? Que triunfos, que palmas, que vitórias?

Os Lusíadas, Canto IV, 94-97

== The position of Camões ==
It remains uncertain to what degree the monologue of the Old Man reflects Camões's own views. There seems to be a contradiction between the writing of a large epic on maritime expeditions, in which there was a clear enthusiasm for the undertaking, and, on the other hand, the fear, apprehension, and pessimism that emerge in this speech and certain other passages in the work. Historian Sanjay Subrahmanyam lists different possible interpretations of the passage: that Camões was criticizing the degenerated moral state of the Portuguese empire in the East in his own time; that he was utilizing a standard theme of nostalgia for Portuguese agrarian life as opposed to its "destiny overseas" (Subrahmanyam considers this less likely); or that Camões was merely acknowledging the historical reality that overseas expansion had its opponents in Portugal in the late fifteenth and early sixteenth centuries.

== Modern references ==
Subsequent allusions in Portuguese to the Old Man of Restelo have tended to portray him in a negative light – as a "doubting Thomas", not as a "Cassandra" who expresses apposite cautions. For example, in a speech in 2013, the Brazilian President Dilma Rousseff said that Brazil would not have been discovered (by Europeans) if "the Old Man of Restelo had prevailed at that time, on that beach, there on the Tagus in Lisbon."
