= Ahvenkoski =

Historic site in the Kymenlaakso region, Finland

Coordinates: 60.493308°N 26.449998°E

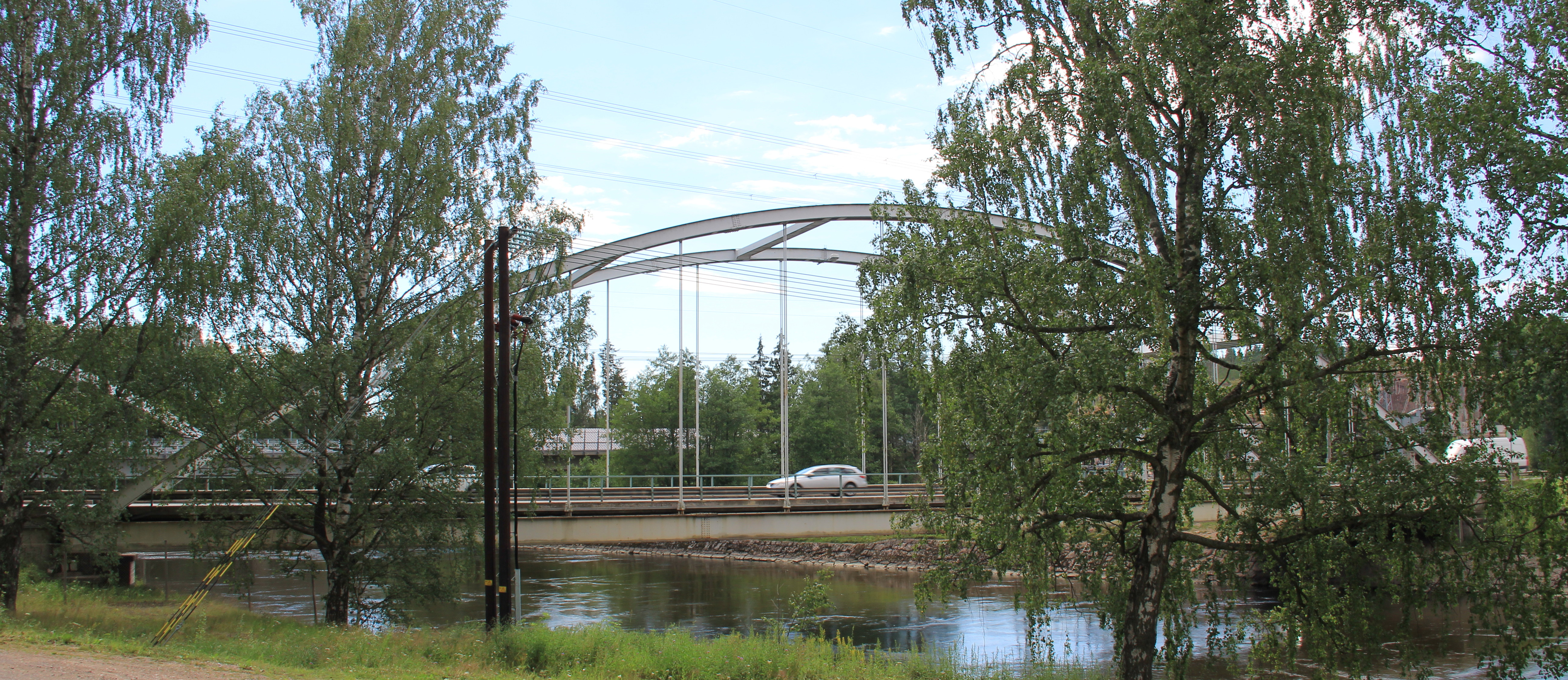
One of the Ahvenkoski bridges

Ahvenkoski (Swedish: Abborfors) is a historical site in the Kymenlaakso region, Finland, located by the westernmost branch of the river Kymijoki. It consists of the Vähä-Ahvenkoski (Swedish: Lillabborfors) village in Loviisa and the Ahvenkoski village in Pyhtää. The site is especially known of its rich military history. Between 1743 and 1809, Ahvenkoski was a border crossing of Sweden and the Russian Empire. Ahvenkoski was originally part of the Pyhtää municipality. As the border divided the village in two, the Swedish side became known as Ruotsinpyhtää, the Swedish Pyhtää, which was annexed to the town of Loviisa in 2010.

Ahvenkoski is listed as a Cultural environment of national significance by the Finnish National Board of Antiquities. The Ahvenkoski rapid was mostly destroyed in the 1930s, as the water level rose several meters due to the construction of a hydroelectric power station.

== History ==
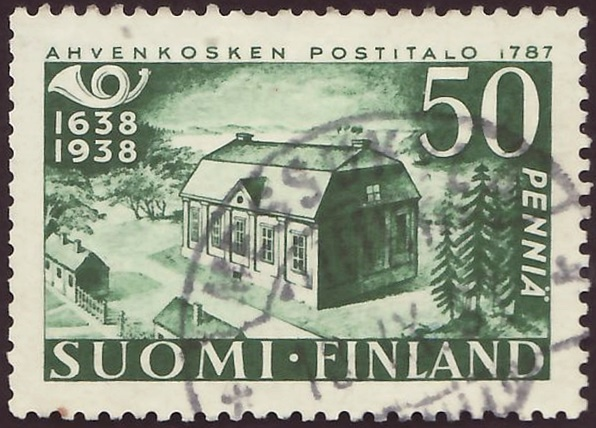
The 18th-century mail house in a Finnish stamp

Ahvenkoski was known as a marketplace since the 13th century. In 2010, the archaeologists found a remnants of a Viking Age harbor. The found objects are similar to the ones found at various Norse activity in the British Isles, and in Norse settlements in different parts of the Northern Europe. The historical King's Road ran by the village, crossing the river through the Kirmusaari Island. The Ahvenkoski Manor was established in 1561. During the Livonian War in the 1570s, the manor and the village were burned down by the Russian troops. The manor was last destroyed in the mid-1800s, the present building was completed 1894.

After the 1741–1743 Russo-Swedish War, the border between Sweden and Russia was moved to Ahvenkoski. Both sides established their mail and custom houses to the village and started building various fortifications by the river.

The Finnish War begun in February 1808, as the Russian troops crossed the border in Ahvenkoski. As war ended, Finland became an autonomous part of the Russian Empire. In 1812, the border of Grand Duchy of Finland and Russia was moved by Alexander I of Russia as a goodwill gesture 200 kilometres east to the Karelian Isthmus, Ahvenkoski lost its importance and the structures started slowly decaying. The last military conflict in the area was the Finnish Civil War Battle of Ahvenkoski, fought between the German troops and the Finnish Red Guards in April 1918. It was the final battle of the Civil War.

== Transport ==
The Finnish national road 7 runs by Ahvenkoski as a part of the European route E18 highway. The highway was rerouted in the 1960s, and the modern four-lane motorway was opened in 2013–2014. The 1928 completed Savukoski Bridge, replacing the one destroyed in the 1918 Civil War, is today a tourist attraction, holding a status of a museum bridge.
