= Virginia af Forselles =

- Born: Virginia Christina Sofia Carlskjöd; April 26, 1759
- Died: October 7, 1847 (aged 88)
- Occupation: Ironmaster
- Years active: 1790-1847
- Spouse: Henrik Johan af Forselles (?-1790, his death)
- Children: 2, including Jacob Henrik af Forselles

Virginia Christina Sofia af Forselles (née Carlskjöd) (26 April 1759 – 7 October 1847 at Ruotsinpyhtää (Strömsfors) in Finland) was a Swedish ironmaster, owner and manager of the local ironworks (ruukki or bruk) of Ruotsinpyhtää, a municipality in Finland. She was referred to as Her Grace by the locals during her lifetime.

== Biography ==
Born in Sweden in 1759, she became the manager of the ironworks in the municipality of Ruotsinpyhtää in Finland in 1790 after the death of her husband Henrik Johan af Forselles, who left her with two children. In 1808, during the Napoleonic Wars, Russian troops crossed the border (which was near her estate during that time) and plundered the village and the ironworks, making her pay for the upkeep of a detachment of soldiers.

After the war Virginia's plead for a tax relief was refused despite the big damages the war had caused. However, she was capable of doing many improvements to the ironworks, e.g. she installed a drop hammer in 1810. Sometimes she used questionable methods to get what she wanted; in 1816 she had to face the court for illegally removing timber from the, nearby forests.

Virginia was concerned about the low quality of craftsmanship, especially after the death of the last guild-trained master smith which left no one who could train apprentices. In 1829 she mentioned that "because of the unskillfulness of smiths for many years we have not smithed more than 400 shippounds a year, sometimes a little more." In 1838 the production of iron bars increased, which was due to the hiring of Swedish smiths, and because of the increased domestic demand for nails, a new nail shop was built in 1846.

Virginia died in 1847 leaving her eldest son, the almost 62-year-old Jacob Henrik af Forselles, as the manager of the ironworks.
