= Mikell =

Mikell may refer to:

== People ==
=== Surname ===
- George Mikell (born 1929), Lithuanian-Australian actor
- Henry J. Mikell (1866-1942), American clergyman
- Quintin Mikell (born 1980), American football player
- Troy Lee Mikell (born 1960s), American basketball player
- William Ephraim Mikell (1868–1944), American legal scholar, lawyer and dean of the University of Pennsylvania Law School

=== Given name ===
- Mikell Simpson (born 1985), American football player

== Places ==
- Mikell's, a jazz club in New York City, U.S.
- Isaac Jenkins Mikell House, a historic house in Charleston, South Carolina, U.S.
