= Gustaf Mickels =

Finnish politician (1879–1949)

Gustaf Evert Mickels (9 November 1879, Ruotsinpyhtää – 24 July 1949) was a Finnish politician. He was a member of the Parliament of Finland from 1922 to 1924, representing the Swedish People's Party of Finland (SFP).
