= Meike =

German and Dutch feminine given name

- Gender: Feminine
- Language: Dutch, German

Other names
- Derived: Maria

Meike is a Dutch and German feminine given name. It is a diminutive short form of Maria.

== People named Meike ==
- Meike Babel, German tennis player
- Meike de Bruijn (born 1970), Dutch road cyclist
- Meike Evers (born 1977), German rower
- Meike Freitag (born 1979), German swimmer
- Meike Hoffmann (born 1962), German art historian and provenance researcher
- Meike Kröger (born 1986), German track and field athlete
- Meike de Nooy (born 1983), Dutch water polo player
- Meike Schmelzer (born 1993), German handball player
- Meike de Vlas (1942–2022), Dutch rower
- Meike Wortel (born 1982), Dutch bridge player
- Meike Ziervogel (born 1967), German writer and publisher

=== Fictional character ===
- Meike Breuer, character of the German soap opera Verbotene Liebe
