= Länsikylä =

Village in Finland

Coordinates: 60°30′36″N 26°39′54″E

Länsikylä (Swedish: Västerby) is a village in the municipality of Pyhtää, Kymenlaakso, Southern Finland province, Finland.
