= Os Lusíadas =

Portuguese epic poem by Luís de Camões

- by Camões
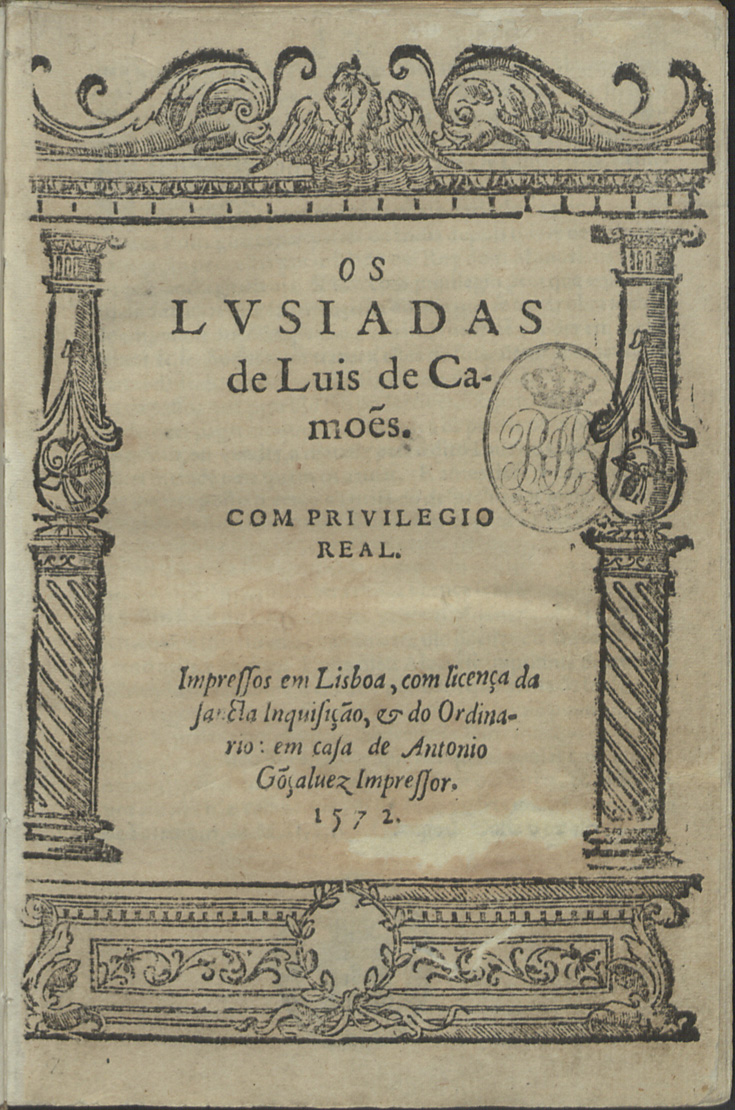
- Front of the first edition of Os Lusíadas
- Translator: Richard Fanshawe (1655); William Julius Mickle (1776); Richard Francis Burton (1880); William C. Atkinson (1952); Landeg White (1997)
- Country: Portugal
- Language: Portuguese
- Genre: Epic poetry
- Media type: Print

Full text
- The Lusiads at Wikisource
- Os Lusíadas at Portuguese Wikisource

Os Lusíadas (Portuguese pronunciation: [uʒ luˈzi.ɐðɐʃ]), usually translated as The Lusiads, is a Portuguese epic poem written by Luís Vaz de Camões (c. 1524/5 – 1580) and first published in 1572. It is widely regarded as the most important work of Portuguese-language literature and is frequently compared to Virgil's Aeneid (1st c. BC). The work celebrates the discovery of a sea route to India by the Portuguese explorer Vasco da Gama (1469–1524). The ten cantos of the poem are in ottava rima and total 1,102 stanzas.

Written in Homeric fashion, the poem focuses mainly on a fantastic interpretation of the Portuguese voyages of discovery during the 15th and 16th centuries. Os Lusíadas is often regarded as Portugal's national epic, much as Virgil's Aeneid was for the Ancient Romans, or Homer's Iliad and Odyssey for the Ancient Greeks. It was written when Camões was an exile in Macau and was first printed in 1572, three years after the author returned from the Indies.

== Internal structure ==
The poem consists of ten cantos, each with a different number of stanzas (1102 in total). It is written in the decasyllabic ottava rima, which has the rhyme scheme ABABABCC, and contains a total of 8816 lines of verse.

The poem is made up of four sections:

- An introduction (proposition – presentation of the theme and heroes of the poem)
- Invocation – a prayer to the Tágides, the nymphs of the Tagus;
- A dedication – (to Sebastian of Portugal)
- Narration (the epic itself) – starting in stanza 19 of canto I, in medias res, opening in the midst of the action, with the background story being told later in the epic.

The narration concludes with an epilogue, starting in stanza 145 of canto X. The most important part of Os Lusíadas, the arrival in India, was placed at the point in the poem that divides the work according to the golden section at the beginning of Canto VII.

== Key concepts ==
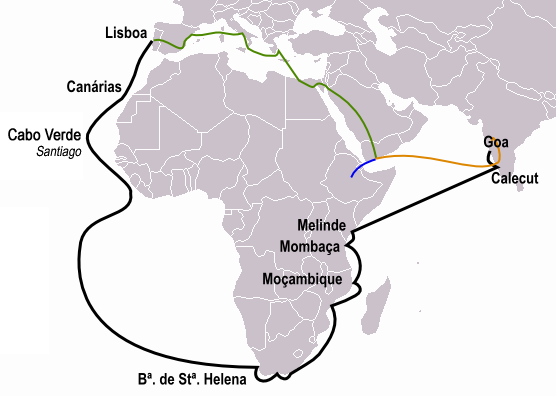
This figure illustrates the path of Vasco da Gama heading for the first time to India (black) as well as the trips of Pêro da Covilhã (orange) and Afonso de Paiva (blue). The path common to both is the green line.

=== The heroes ===
The heroes of the epic are the Lusiads (Lusíadas), the sons of Lusus—in other words, the Portuguese. The initial strophes of Jupiter's speech in the Concílio dos Deuses Olímpicos (Council of the Olympian Gods), which open the narrative part, highlight the laudatory orientation of the author.

In these strophes, Camões speaks of the first and second Viriathus and Quintus Sertorius, the people of Lusus, a people predestined by the Fates to accomplish great deeds. Jupiter says that their history proves it because, having emerged victorious against the Moors and Castilians, this tiny nation has gone on to discover new worlds and impose its law in the concert of the nations.

The extraordinary Portuguese discoveries and the "new kingdom that they exalted so much" ("novo reino que tanto sublimaram") in the East, and certainly the recent and extraordinary deeds of the "strong Castro" ("Castro forte", the viceroy Dom João de Castro), who had died some years before the poet's arrival in Indian lands, were the decisive factors in Camões' completion of the Portuguese epic. Camões dedicated his masterpiece to King Sebastian of Portugal.

=== The narrators and their speeches ===
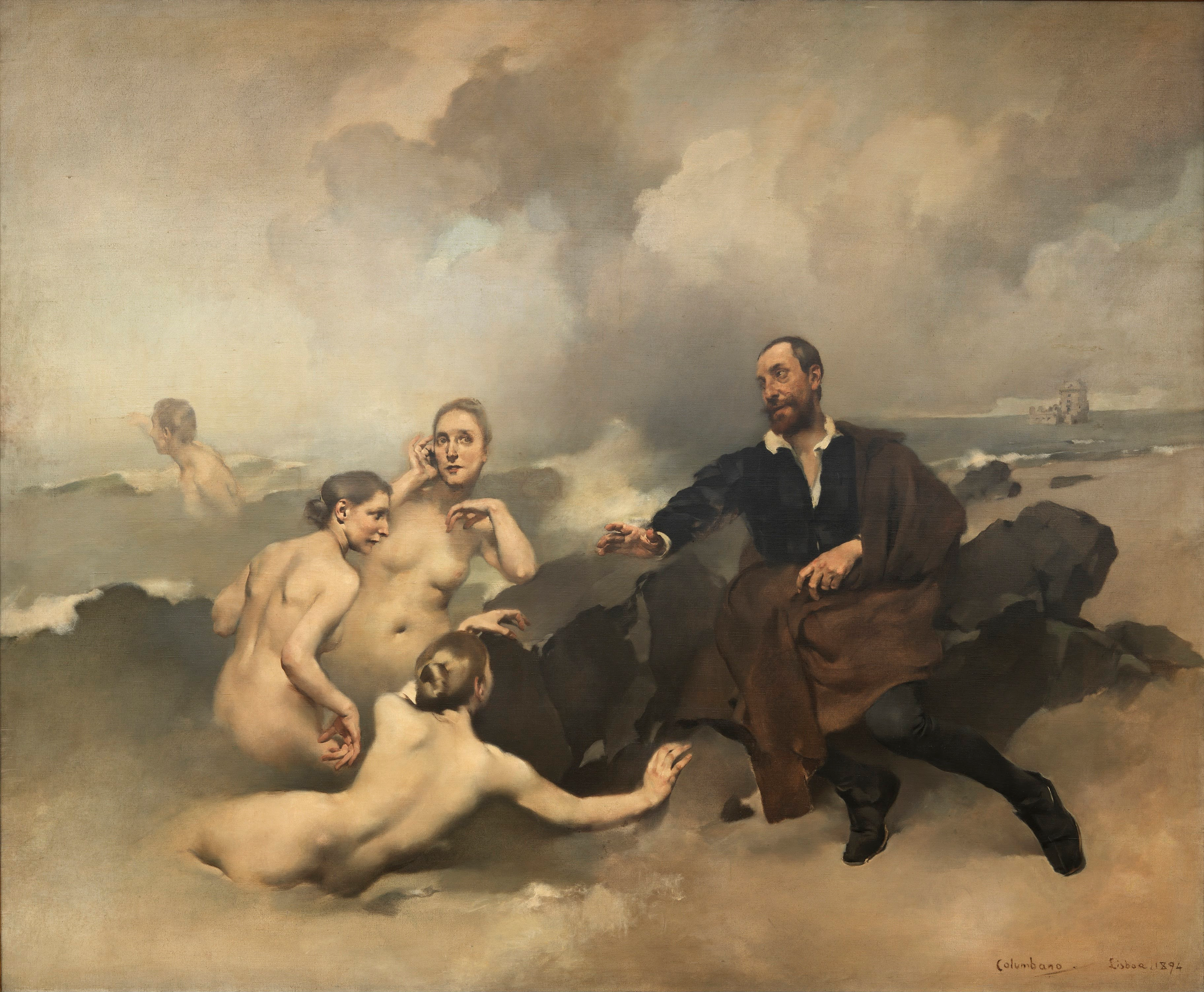
"Camões and the Nymphs", by Columbano Bordalo Pinheiro, 1894.

The vast majority of the narration in Os Lusíadas consists of grandiloquent speeches by various orators: the main narrator; Vasco da Gama, recognized as "eloquent captain" ("facundo capitão"); Paulo da Gama; Thetis; and the Siren who tells the future in Canto X. The poet asks the Tágides (nymphs of the river Tagus) to give him "a high and sublime sound,/ a grandiloquent and flowing style" ("um som alto e sublimado, / Um estilo grandíloquo e corrente"). In contrast to the style of lyric poetry, or "humble verse" ("verso humilde"), he is thinking about this exciting tone of oratory. There are in the poem some speeches that are brief but notable, including Jupiter's and the Old Man of the Restelo's.

There are also descriptive passages, like the description of the palaces of Neptune and the Samorim of Calicute, the locus amoenus of the Island of Love (Canto IX), the dinner in the palace of Thetis (Canto X), and Gama's cloth (end of Canto II). Sometimes these descriptions are like a slide show, in which someone shows each of the things described there; examples include the geographic start of Gama's speech to the king of Melinde, certain sculptures of the palaces of Neptune and the Samorim, the speech of Paulo da Gama to the Catual, and the Machine of the World (Máquina do Mundo).

Examples of dynamic descriptions include the "battle" of the Island of Mozambique, the battles of Ourique and Aljubarrota, and the storm. Camões is a master in these descriptions, marked by the verbs of movement, the abundance of visual and acoustic sensations, and expressive alliterations. There are also many lyrical moments. Those texts are normally narrative-descriptive. This is the case with the initial part of the episode of the Sad Inês, the final part of the episode of the Adamastor, and the encounter on the Island of Love (Canto IX). All these cases resemble eclogues.

On several occasions the poet assumes a tone of lamentation, as at the end of Canto I, in parts of the speech of the Old Man of the Restelo, the end of Canto V, the beginning and end of Canto VII, and the final strophes of the poem. Many times, da Gama bursts into oration at challenging moments: in Mombasa (Canto II), on the appearance of Adamastor, and in the middle of the terror of the storm. The poet's invocations to the Tágides and nymphs of Mondego (Cantos I and VII) and to Calliope (beginning of Cantos III and X), in typological terms, are also orations. Each one of these types of speech shows stylistic peculiarities.

== Synopses of Cantos ==
=== Canto I ===
The epic begins with a dedication section, with the poet paying homage to Virgil and Homer. The first line mimics the opening line of the Aeneid, and pays a hopeful tribute to the young King Sebastião. The story then (in imitation of the classical epics) portrays the gods of Greece watching over the voyage of Vasco da Gama. Just as the gods had divided loyalties during the voyages of Odysseus and Aeneas, here Venus, who favors the Portuguese, is opposed by Bacchus, who is here associated with the east and resents the encroachment on his territory. We encounter Vasco da Gama's voyage in medias res as they have already rounded the Cape of Good Hope. At the urging of Bacchus, who is disguised as a Moor, the local Muslims plot to attack the explorer and his crew.

=== Canto II ===
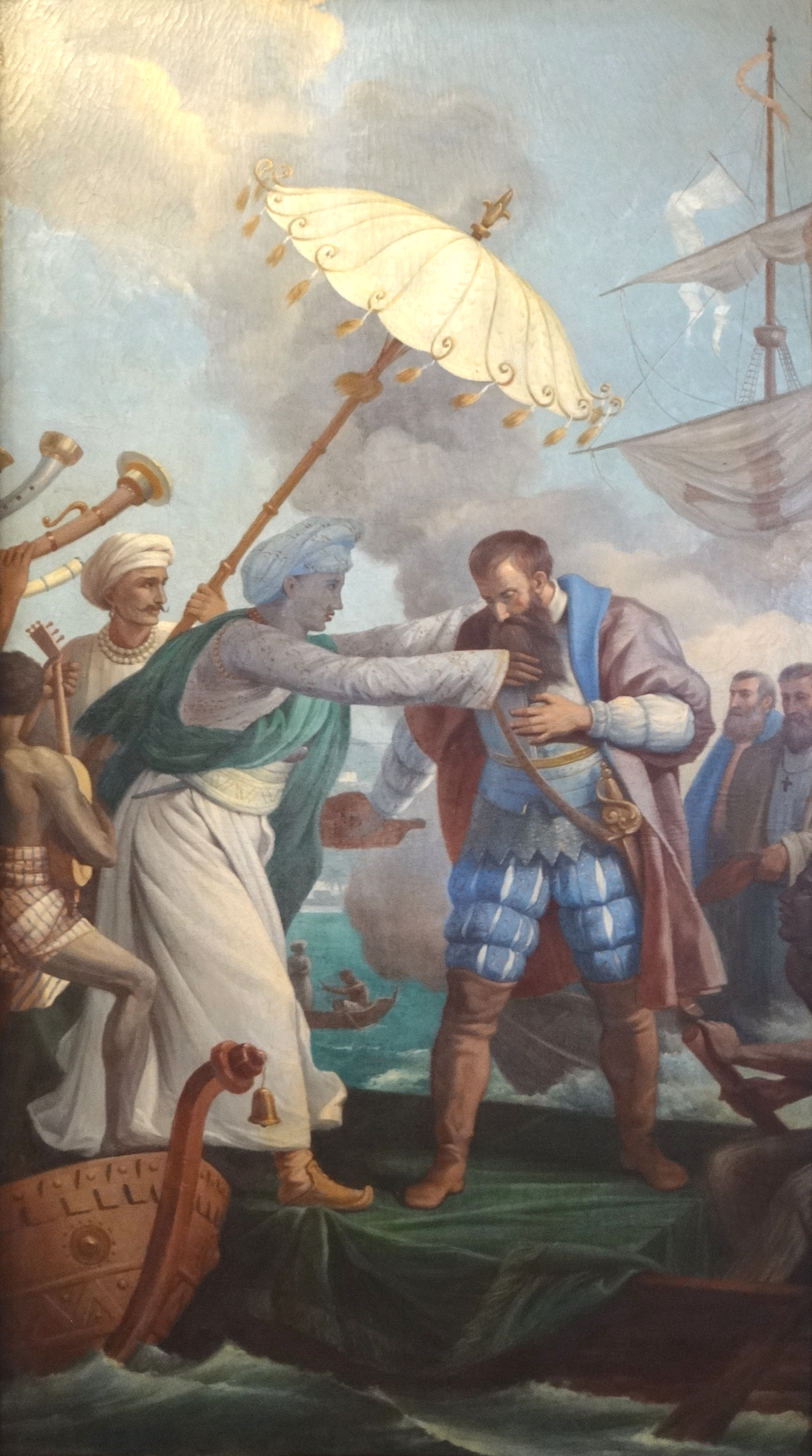
"Vasco da Gama and the king of Malindi".

Two scouts sent by Vasco da Gama are fooled by a fake altar created by Bacchus into thinking that there are Christians among the Muslims. Thus, the explorers are lured into an ambush but successfully survive with the aid of Venus. Venus pleads with her father Jove, who predicts great fortunes for the Portuguese in the east. The fleet lands at Melinde where it is welcomed by a friendly Sultan.

=== Canto III ===
After an appeal by the poet to Calliope, the Greek muse of epic poetry, Vasco da Gama begins to narrate the history of Portugal. He starts by referring to the situation of Portugal in Europe and the legendary story of Lusus and Viriathus. This is followed by passages on the meaning of Portuguese nationality and then by an enumeration of the warrior deeds of the first Portuguese dynasty of kings, from Afonso I to Ferdinand I. Episodes that stand out include Egas Moniz and the Battle of Ourique during Afonso Henriques' reign, formosíssima Maria (the beautiful Maria, in 16th-century Portuguese) in the Battle of Salado, and Inês de Castro during the reign of Afonso IV.

=== Canto IV ===
Vasco da Gama continues the narrative of the history of Portugal by recounting the story of the House of Aviz from the 1383–85 Crisis until the moment the reign of king Manuel I when the armada of Vasco da Gama sails to India. The narrative of the Crisis of 1383–85, which focuses mainly on the figure of Nuno Álvares Pereira and the Battle of Aljubarrota, is followed by the events of the reigns of John II, especially those related to expansion into Africa.

Following this incident, the poem narrates the maritime journey to India—an aim that John II did not accomplish during his lifetime, but would come true with king Manuel, to whom the rivers Indus and Ganges appeared in dreams foretelling the future glories of the Orient. This canto ends with the sailing of the Armada, the sailors in which are surprised by the prophetically pessimistic words of an old man who was on the beach among the crowd. This is the episode of the Old Man of the Restelo.

=== Canto V ===
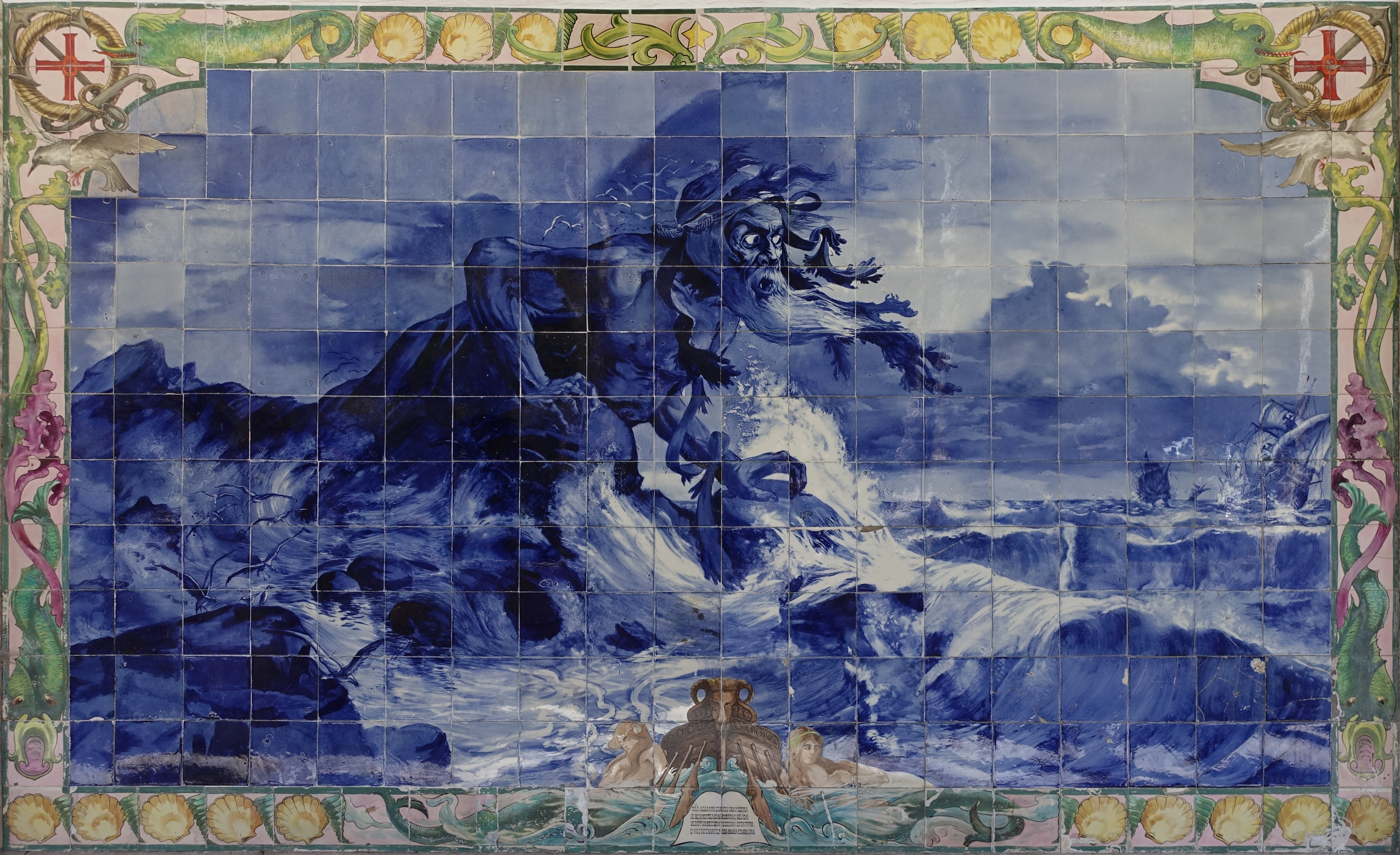
Adamastor, depicted by Jorge Colaço.

The story moves on to the Kingdom of Malindi, describing the journey of the Armada from Lisbon to Malindi. During the voyage, the sailors see the Southern Cross, St. Elmo's Fire, and face a variety of dangers and obstacles such as the hostility of natives in the episode of Fernão Veloso, the fury of a monster in the episode of the giant Adamastor, and the disease and death caused by scurvy. Canto V ends with the poet's censure of his contemporaries who despise poetry.

=== Canto VI ===
After Vasco da Gama's narrative, the armada sails from Melinde guided by a pilot to teach them the way to Calicut. Bacchus, seeing that the Portuguese are about to arrive in India, asks for help of Neptune, who convenes a "Council of the Sea Gods" whose decision is to support Bacchus and unleash powerful winds to sink the armada. Then, while the sailors are listening to Fernão Veloso telling the legendary and chivalrous episode of The Twelve of England, a storm strikes.

Vasco da Gama, seeing the near destruction of his caravels, prays to his own God, but it is Venus who helps the Portuguese by sending the Nymphs to seduce the winds and calm them down. After the storm, the armada sights Calicut, and Vasco da Gama gives thanks to God. The canto ends with the poet speculating about the value of the fame and glory reached through great deeds.

=== Canto VII ===
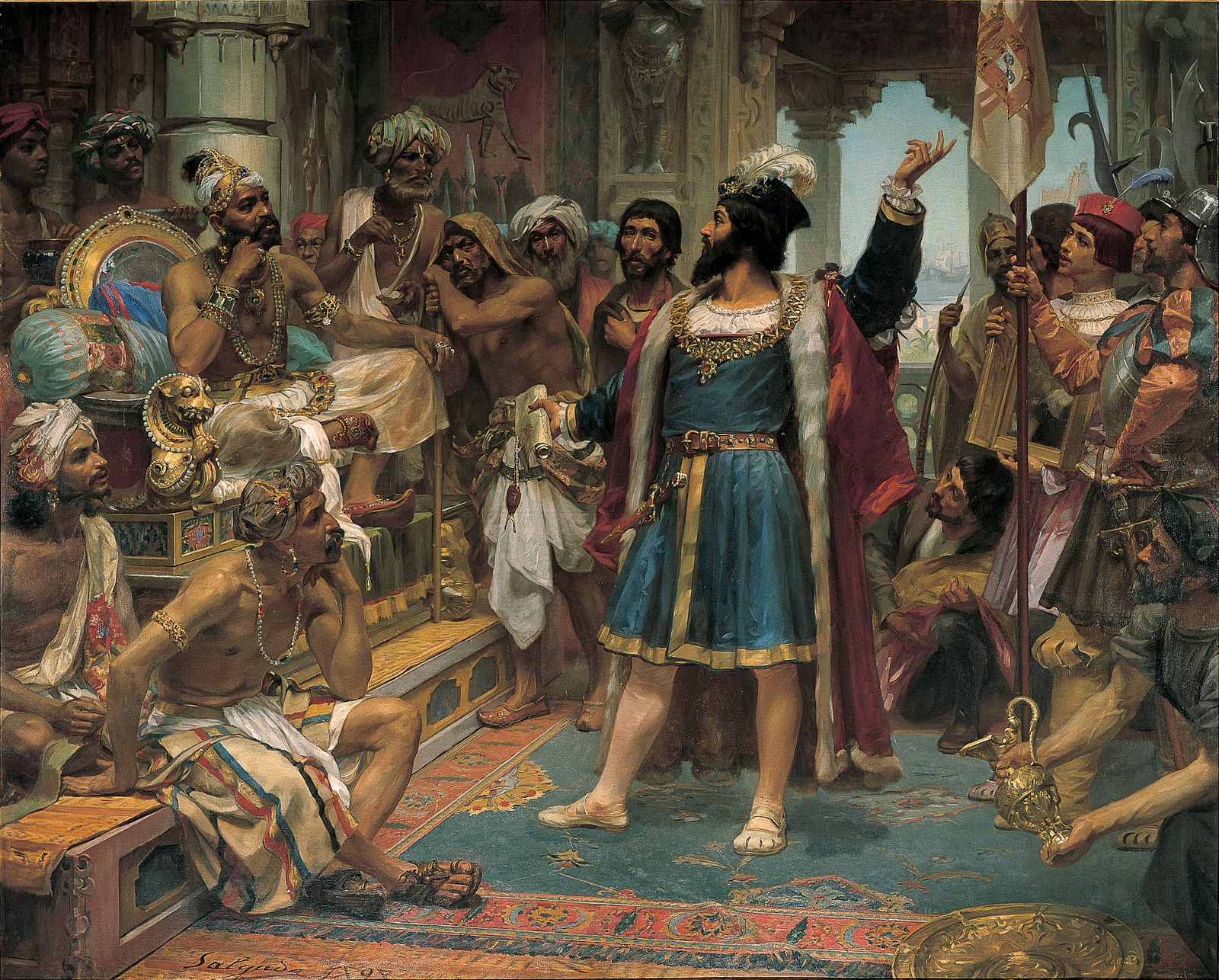
Vasco da Gama before the Zamorin of Calicut, by Veloso Salgado.

After condemning some of the other nations of Europe (who in his opinion fail to live up to Christian ideals), the poet tells of the Portuguese fleet reaching the Indian city of Calicut. A Muslim named Monçaide greets the fleet and tells the explorers about the lands they have reached. The king, Samorin, hears of the newcomers and summons them. A governor and official of the king, called the Catual, leads the Portuguese to the king, who receives them well. The Catual speaks with Monçaide to learn more about the new arrivals. The Catual then goes to the Portuguese ships himself to confirm what Monsayeed has told him and is treated well.

=== Canto VIII ===
The Catual sees a number of paintings that depict significant figures and events from Portuguese history, all of which are detailed by the author. Bacchus appears in a vision to a Muslim priest in Samorin's court and convinces him that the explorers are a threat. The priest spreads the warnings among the Catuals and the court, prompting Samorin to confront Gama on his intentions. Gama insists that the Portuguese are traders, not buccaneers. The king then demands proof from da Gama's ships, but when he tries to return to the fleet, da Gama finds that the Catual, who has been corrupted by the Muslim leaders, refuses to lend him a boat at the harbor and holds him prisoner. Da Gama manages to get free only after agreeing to have all of the goods on the ships brought to shore to be sold.

=== Canto IX ===
The Isle of Love, by Alexandre-Joseph Desenne and Théodore Richomme

The Muslims plot to detain the Portuguese until the annual trading fleet from Mecca can arrive to attack them, but Monçaide tells da Gama of the conspiracy, and the ships escape from Calicut. To reward the explorers for their efforts, Venus prepares an island for them to rest on and asks her son Cupid to inspire Nereids with desire for them. When the sailors arrive on the Isle of Love, the ocean nymphs make a pretense of running but surrender quickly.

=== Canto X ===
During a sumptuous feast on the Isle of Love, Thetis, who is now the lover of da Gama, prophecises on the future of Portuguese exploration and conquest. She tells of Duarte Pacheco Pereira's defense of Cochin (Battle of Cochin); the Battle of Diu fought by Francisco de Almeida and his son Lourenço de Almeida against combined Gujarati-Egyptian fleets; the deeds of Tristão da Cunha, Pedro de Mascarenhas, Lopo Vaz de Sampaio and Nuno da Cunha; and battles fought by Martim Afonso de Sousa and João de Castro. Thetis then guides da Gama to a summit and reveals to him a vision of how the (Ptolemaic) universe operates. The tour continues with glimpses of the lands of Africa and Asia. The legend of the martyrdom of the apostle St. Thomas in India is told at this point. Finally, Thetis relates the voyage of Magellan. The epic concludes with more advice to young King Sebastião.

== Observations about some episodes ==
=== The Council of the Olympic gods ===
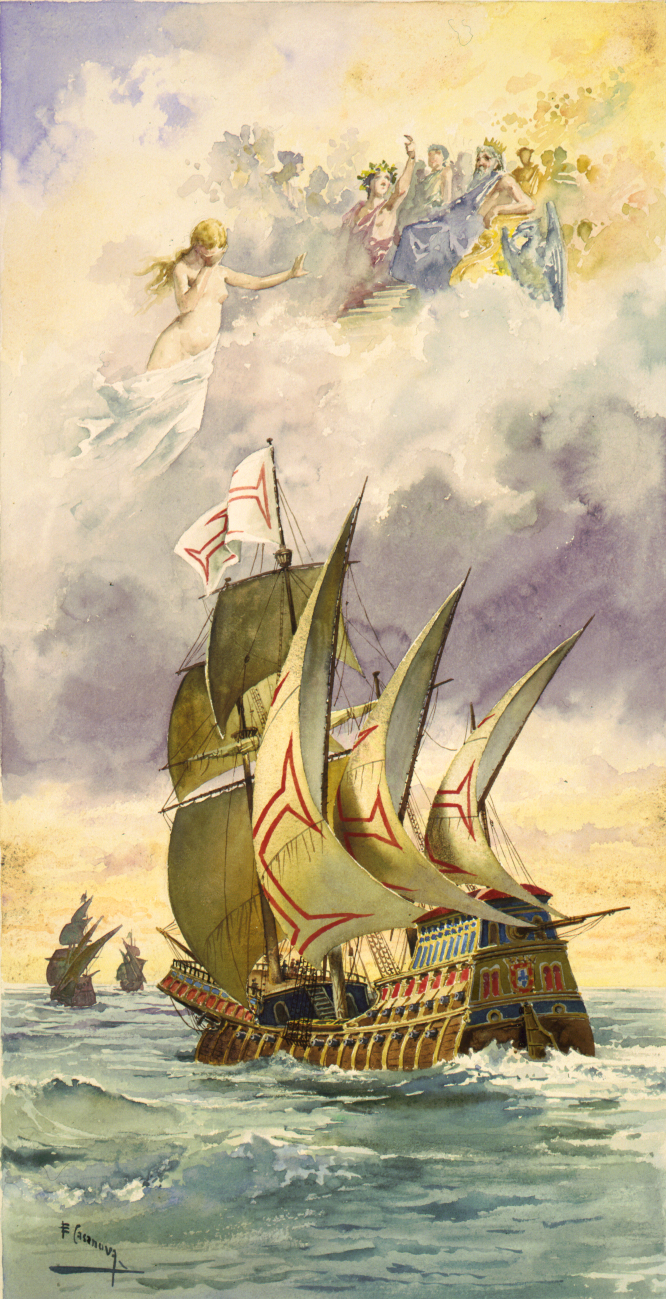
The council of the olympian gods by Ernesto Casanova.

This episode, which comes right after the first stanza of the narration (no. 19 of Canto I) and depicts the entry of the caravan of carracks in the poem, sailing into the unknown upon the sheet of white foam of the Indian Ocean, has huge significance in the organization of the poem. The gods of the four corners of the world are reunited to talk about "the future matters of the East" ("as cousas futuras do Oriente"); in fact, what they are going to decide is whether the Portuguese will be allowed to reach India and what will happen next.

The gods are described by Jupiter as residents of the "shiny, / starry Pole and bright Seat" ("luzente, estelífero Pólo e claro Assento"); this shiny, starry Pole and bright Seat or Olympus had already been described before as "luminous"; the Gods walk on the "beautiful crystalline sky" ("cristalino céu fermoso"), to the Milky Way. In strophes 22 and 23 they are also said to be shining. Jupiter is described as the "Father" ("Padre" – archaic Portuguese for 'father') who "vibrates the fierce rays of Vulcan" ("vibra os feros raios de Vulcano") and presides from a "crystalline seat of stars" ("assento de estrelas cristalino"), carrying "a gleaming crown and sceptre / of another rock clearer than diamond" ("hua coroa e ceptro rutilante / de outra pedra mais clara que diamante"). Jupiter's chair is a crystalline seat of stars and the rest of the Olympian furniture is equally ornate: "In shiny seats, enamelled / of gold and pearls, under there were / the other gods (...)" ("Em luzentes assentos, marchetados / de ouro e perlas, mais abaixo estavam / os outros Deuses (...)").

During the council, the behaviour of the gods is described as disgraceful. It starts as "Reason and Order demanded" "a Razão e a Ordem concertavam", but it ends in insubordination, to which Mars brutally puts an end.

Jupiter, after the end of his speech, entirely neglects the guidance of the other Gods, so two parties are formed: the party of Venus, favourable to the Portuguese, and the party of Bacchus, defending the interests of this god who wanted to stop the Portuguese from reaching their goal. The council ends by accepting the point of view earlier expressed by Jupiter; however, Bacchus will not accept this.

The speech that Jupiter uses to start the meeting is a finished piece of oratory. It opens with an exordium (1st strophe), in which, after an original welcome, Jupiter briefly defines the subject. This is followed, in the ancient rhetorical fashion, by the narration (the past shows that the intention of the Fados is the same one that the orator presented). There is then a confirmation of suggestions already put forth in the narration of the 4th strophe. This episode then ends with two strophes of peroration, where Jupiter appeals to the benevolence of the gods concerning the sons of Lusus, with Jupiter's speech eventually settling the debate.

=== A lyric-tragic episode ===
The episode known usually as "of Inês de Castro", is one of the most famous of Os Lusíadas (canto III, stanzas 118–135). It is normally classified as a lyric, thus distinguishing it from the more common war episodes. The episode discusses destiny, and leads the action to its tragic end, even something close to the coir (apostrophes).

The nobility of the characters is also emphasised, in a way that is intended to create feelings of sympathy when the protagonist suffers. This technique is used most strongly when Inês fears the orphaning of her children more than losing her own life and she begs for the commutation of capital punishment for an exile in Siberia (Cítia) or in Libya in order to have an opportunity to raise her children, and she is compared with "the young beautiful Policena". Strophes 134 and 135 are written to evoke this pity.

=== Adamastor ===
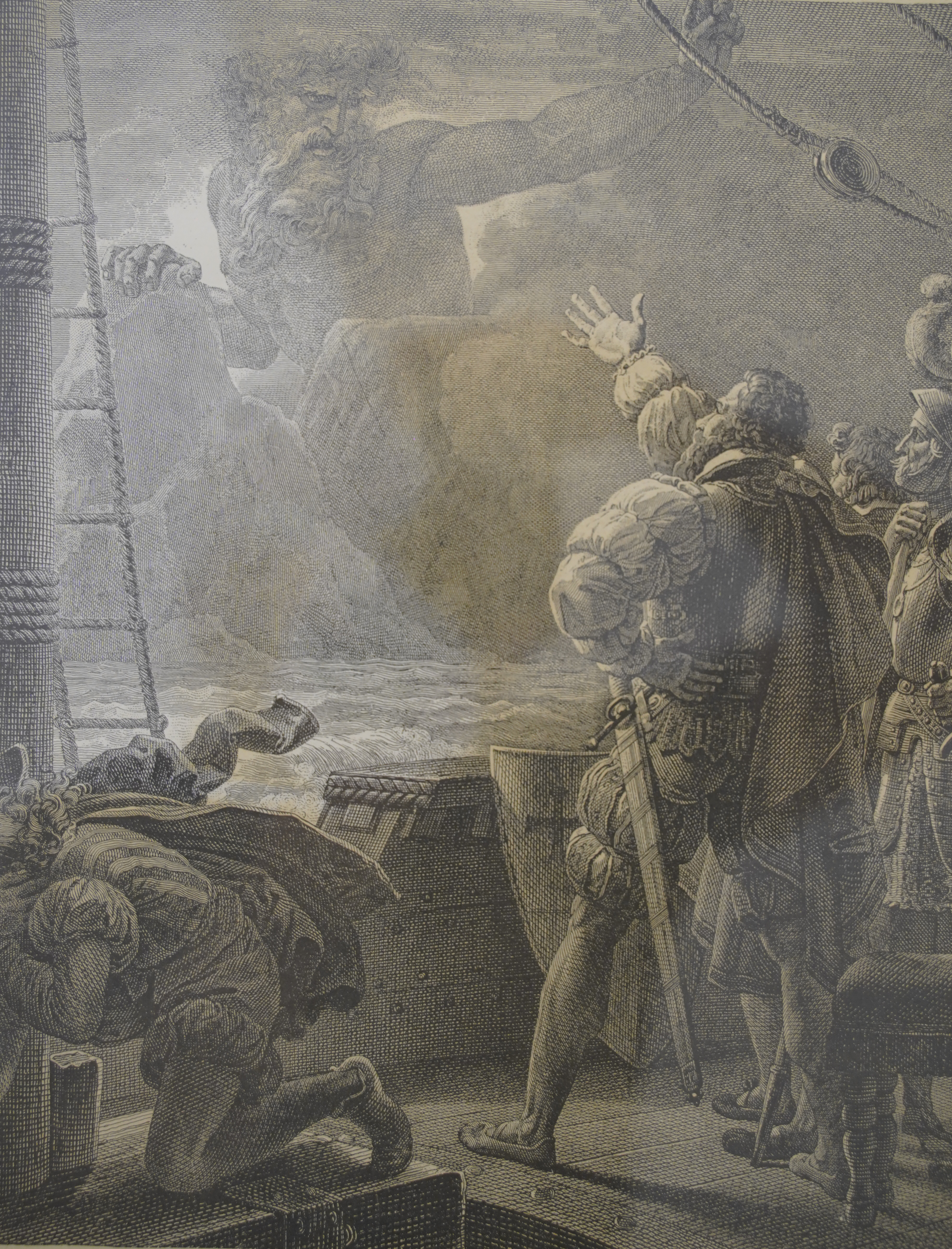
Engraving of Adamastor.

The Adamastor episode is divided into three segments. The first, a theophany, goes from stanza 37 to 40; the second, which in chronological-narrative terms is a prolepsis, occupies strophes 41 to 48; finally, the third part, a marine eclogue with some points of contact with Écloga III of Camões, ends in stanza 59.

The vigorous theophany that the first part describes is in the following verses: "Chill the flesh and the hairs/ to me and all [the others] only by listening and seeing him" ("Arrepiam-se as carnes e os cabelos / a mi e a todos só de ouvi-lo e vê-lo"). This is intended to convey pure fear, the imminent threat of annihilation. The evil demigod is preceded by a black cloud, which appears above the heads of the sailors. Expressing the surprise he experiences, Gama quotes himself: "Oh divine power – [I] said – sublimated, / what divine threat or what secret / this clime and this sea presents to us / that seems a bigger thing than a storm?" ("Ó potestade – disse – sublimada, / que ameaço divino ou que segredo / este clima e este mar nos apresenta, / que mor cousa parece que tormenta?") The "strange Colossus" ("estranhíssimo Colosso"): "Rude son of the Earth" ("Filho aspérrimo da Terra") is described as having: "huge stature", "squalid beard", "earthy colour", "full of earth and crinkly of hairs / blacken the mouth, yellow the teeth" ("disforme estatura", "barba esquálida", "cor terrena", "cheios de terra e crespos os cabelos / a boca negra, os dentes, amarelos").

Such emphasis on the appearance of Adamastor is intended to contrast with the preceding scenery, which was expressed as: "seas of the South" ("mares do Sul"): "(...) / the winds blowing favourably / when one night, being careless/ watching in the cutting bow, / (...)" ("(...) / prosperamente os ventos assoprando, / quando hua noite, estando descuidados / na cortadora proa vigiando, / (...)"). The final marine eclogue conforms to a pattern that is common to many of Camões' lyrical compositions: falling in love, forced separation, grieving over the frustrated dream.

=== The eclogue of the Island of Love ===
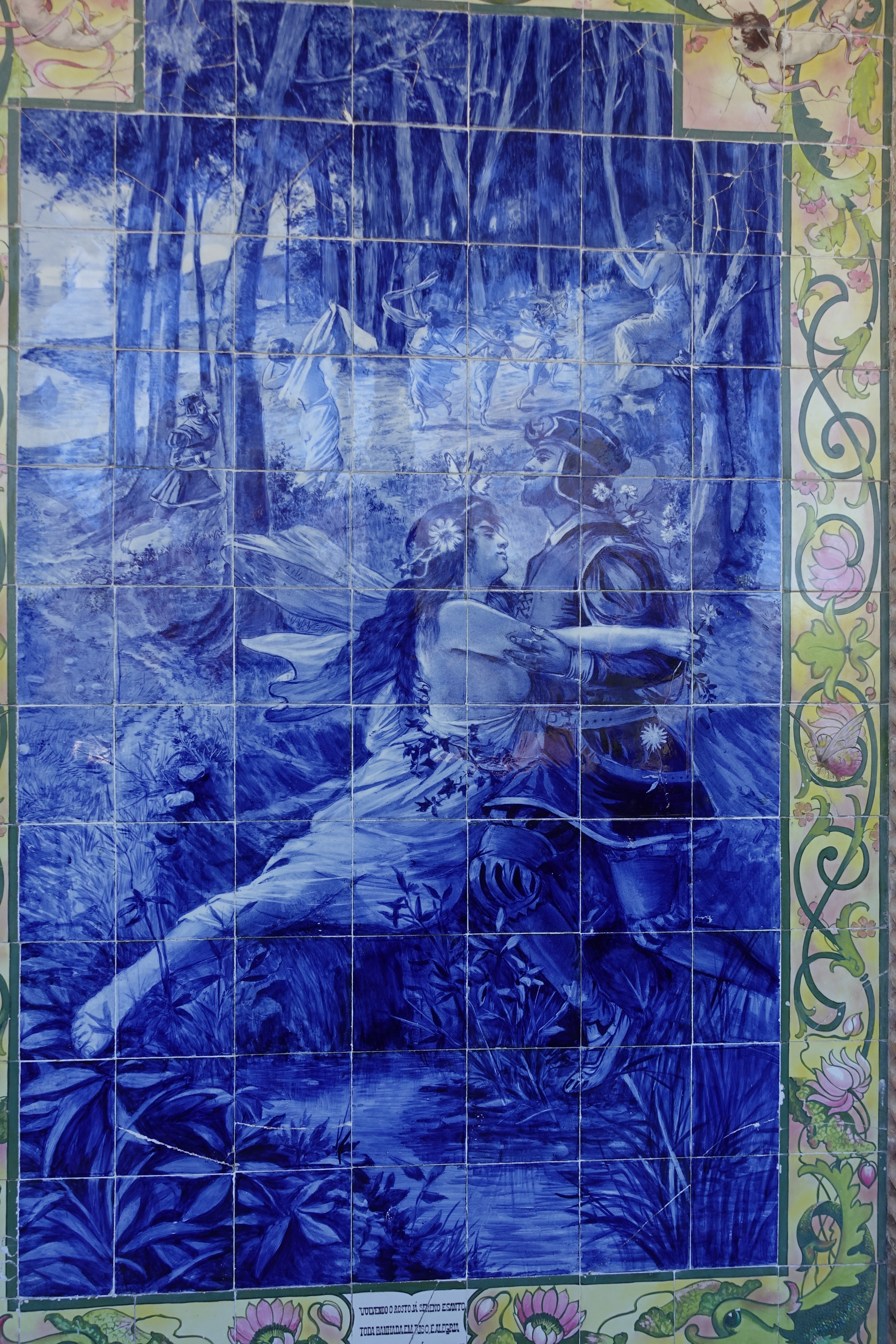
The Island of Love, depicted in a tile panel at Bussaco Palace.

The locus amoenus: the stanza that comes after stanza 52 of Canto IX, and some of the main parts that appear from stanza 68 to 95 describe the scenery where the love encountered between the sailors and the Nymphs take place. The poet also talks about the fauna that live there and of fruits produced instantly. It is portrayed as a paradise.

The allegory in the second part of Canto IX sees Camões describing the scene between the sailors – whom the Nymphs were expecting – prepared by Venus. Given in an allegoric sense:

Que as Ninfas do Oceano, tão fermosas,
Tétis e a Ilha angélica pintada,
Outra cousa não é que as deleitosas
Honras que a vida fazem sublimada

— strophe 89
Translation:

That the Nymphs of the Ocean, so beautiful,
Thetis and the angelic painted Island,
Are none other than the delightful
Honours that render life sublime

The Canto is ended with the poet communicating to the reader:

Impossibilidades não façais,
Que quem quis sempre pôde: e numerados
Sereis entre os heróis esclarecidos
E nesta Ilha de Vénus recebidos.

Translation:

Impossiblities you cannot do,
Who always wanted always could: and numbered
You will be amongst the famous heroes
And in this Isle of Venus received.

=== The Machine of the World ===
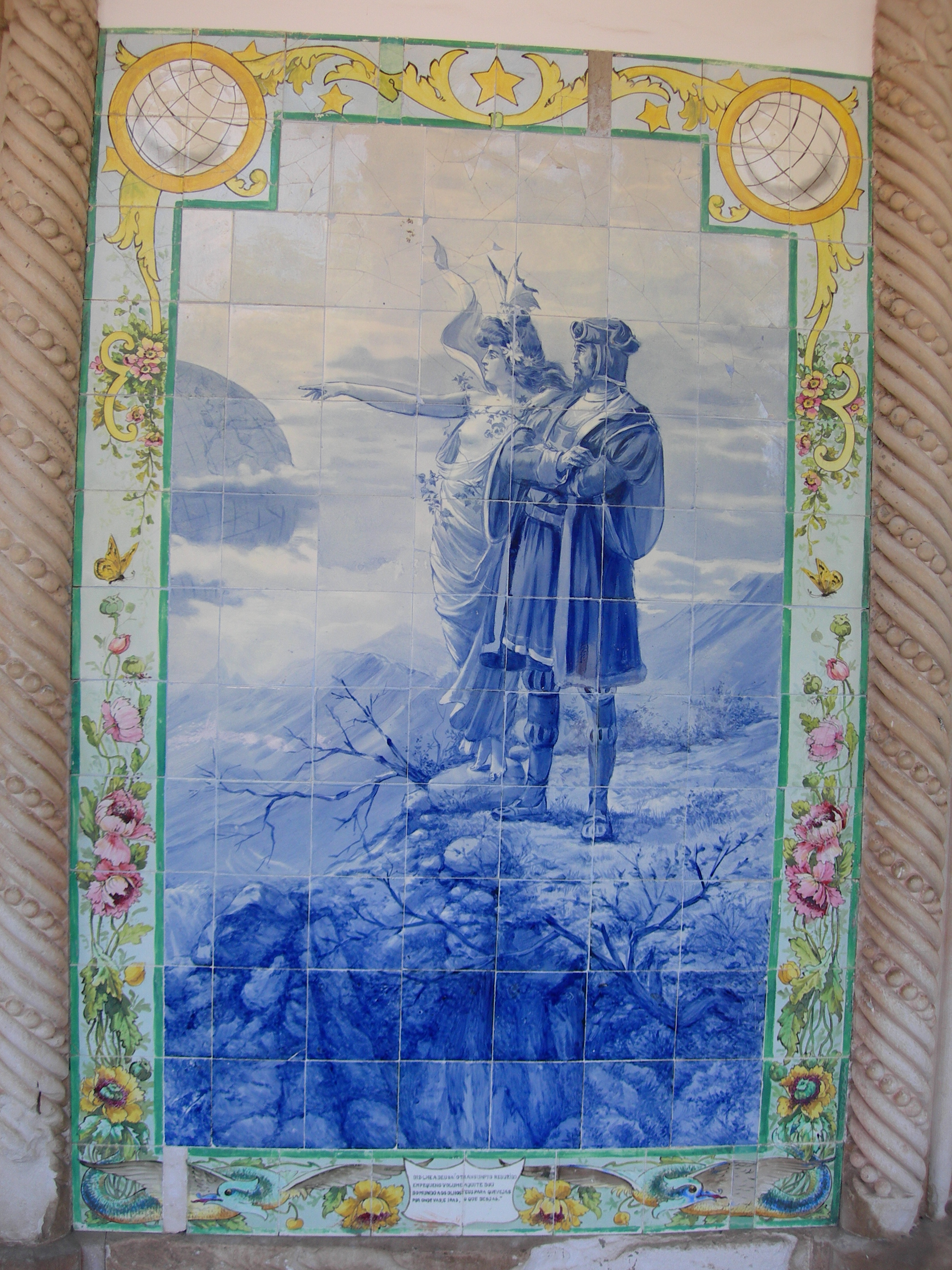
"The Machine of the World", allegorical tile panel in Bussaco Palace.

In Canto X, before the sailors return home the Siren invites Gama to the spectacle of the Machine of the World (Máquina do Mundo) with these words:

Faz-te mercê, barão, a sapiência
Suprema de, cos olhos corporais,
veres o que não pode a vã ciência
dos errados e míseros mortais

Translation:

Your lordship's wish is now fulfilled to share the supreme
knowledge; you with corporeal eyes
may see what the vain science
of erring and miserable mortals cannot

The Machine of the World is presented as the spectacle unique, divine, seen by "corporeal eyes". In the words of literary historian António José Saraiva, "it is one of the supreme successes of Camões", "the spheres are transparent, luminous, all of them are seen at the same time with equal clarity; they move, and the movement is perceptible, although the visible surface is always the same. To be able to translate this by the "painting that talks" is to achieve one of the highest points in universal literature."

== Responses ==
Manuel de Faria e Sousa wrote a commentary about the work in the 17th century. Published after Sousa's death, the work was originally written in Spanish and eventually translated into Portuguese in the 19th century.

1972 Portuguese commemorative 50 escudos coin celebrating the 400th year of the publishing of Os Lusíadas.

== English translations ==
- The Lusiad, trans. Richard Fanshawe (1655)
- The Lusiads, trans. William Julius Mickle (1776)
- The Lusiad, trans. Thomas Moore Musgrave (1826)
- The Lusiad (Books I to V), trans. Edward Quillinan (1853)
- The Lusiad, trans. Thomas Mitchell (1854)
- The Lusiads, trans. John James Aubertin (1878)
- The Lusiad, trans. Robert Ffrench Duff (1880)
- The Lusiads, trans. Richard Francis Burton (1880)
- O Primeiro Canto dos Lusíadas em Inglez, trans. James Edwin Hewitt (1881)
- The Lusiads, trans. Leonard Bacon (The Hispanic Society of America, 1950)
- The Lusiads, trans. William C. Atkinson (Penguin, 1952)
- The Lusiads, trans. Landeg White (Oxford, 1997)

== See also ==
- Portuguese discovery of the sea route to India
