= Mikal =

Mikal may refer to:

- Mikal, Gilan, Iran
- Mikal (given name), includes a list of people with the name
