= Meile =

Meile may refer to:

- the German term for mile and as such part of horse races' proper names:
  - Badener Meile, Group 3 flat horse race in Germany
  - Frankfurter Meile, Group 3 flat horse race in Germany
  - Grosse Europa-Meile, Group 2 flat horse race in Germany
  - Hamburger Meile, Group 3 flat horse race in Germany
- Galerie Urs Meile, Beijing-Lucerne, contemporary art gallery
- Meilė Lukšienė (1913–2009), Lithuanian cultural historian and activist
- Meile Rockefeller (born 1955), the daughter of Rodman Rockefeller
