= William Julius Mickle (physician) =

British-Canadian medical doctor (1845–1917)

William Julius Mickle FRCP (13 March 1845, Guelph Township, Canada West – 14 November 1917, Barrie, Southern Ontario) was a Canadian-British medical doctor and medical superintendent of a mental asylum in the London Borough of Tower Hamlets. He is known for his 1880 book General Paralysis of the Insane with a 2nd edition in 1886.

== Biography ==
He was a great-grandson of the Scottish poet William Julius Mickle and a grandson of Charles Julius Mickle, who emigrated from Scotland to Canada. The Canadian W. Julius Mickle studied medicine at Philadelphia's Jefferson Medical College and at the University of Toronto. In Toronto he graduated with an M.B. in 1866 and an M.D. in 1867. He went to England for medical training at London's St Thomas' Hospital. There he studied mental diseases and received in 1869 the diplomas M.R.C.S. and L.S.A. He was appointed in 1873 the medical superintendent of London's Grove Hall Private Lunatic Asylum, where he worked until he retired at about the age of 62. In 1879 he became a Member of the Royal College of Physicians. During his career in London he was also appointed to lectureships in mental physiology and mental diseases at Middlesex Hospital Medical School and at University College Hospital.

In retirement he lived in Bayswater, West London, until the last few years of his life. Failing health caused him to return to Canada, where he joined relatives until his death.

Mickel was appointed in 1887 a Fellow of the Royal College of Physicians (F.R.C.P.). In 1888 he was the Goulstonian Lecturer. He advocated an extremely limited use of mechanical restraints for mentally ill patients. He was a leading expert on British law related to mental illness and the relation of syphilis to insanity and general paralysis. He contributed to Daniel Hack Tuke's 2-volume Dictionary of Psychological Medicine (J. & A. Churchill, 1892). For the academic year 1895–1896 Mickle was the president of the Medico-Psychological Association (which is now called the Royal College of Psychiatrists). In 1906 the University of Toronto awarded him an Honorary LL.D.

After Mickle's retirement, the University of London established the William Julius Mickle Fellowship (sometimes referred to as the Julius Mickle Fellowship). This fellowship was awarded in 1927 to Percival Hartley and in 1954 to Philip Eggleton. In honour of his parents, Mickie's will established two awards, the "Charles Mickle Fellowship" and the "Ellen Mickle Fellowship", in the Faculty of Medicine of the University of Toronto in 1921. The Charles Mickle Fellowship was awarded in 1944 to Alexander Fleming, in 1952 to Norman Gregg, and in 1964 to Peter Joseph Moloney. In 1954 the Ellen Mickle Fellowship was awarded to Keith Roy Wightman.

== Selected publications ==
- Mickle, W. Julius (1877). "Unilateral Sweating in General Paralysis of the Insane". Journal of Mental Science. 23 (102): 196–213. doi:10.1192/bjp.23.102.196.
- —— (1881). "Rapid Death from Haemorrhage into the Pons Varolii and Medulla Oblongata". BMJ. 2 (1074): 150–152. doi:10.1136/bmj.2.1074.150. PMC 2264021. PMID 20749944.
- —— (1882). "The Knee-jerk in General Paralysis". Journal of Mental Science. 28 (123): 343–347. doi:10.1192/bjp.28.123.343.
- —— (1883). "Case of Acute Peritonitis following Intestinal Perforation". BMJ. 1 (1170): 1063. doi:10.1136/bmj.1.1170.1063. PMC 2372533. PMID 20750624.
- Kirk, R.; —— (1886). "The Pupils in Cheyne-Stokes' Respiration". The Lancet. 128 (3302): 1153–1154. doi:10.1016/S0140-6736(00)49551-6. (two independently authored letters to the editor)
- —— (1896). "Extract. Chapter I. Atypical and Unusual Brain-Forms, especially in Relation to Mental Status: A Study on Brain-Surface Morphology". Journal of Mental Science. 42 (178): 541–583. doi:10.1192/bjp.42.178.541.
- —— (1898). "Extract. Chapter VIII. Atypical and unusual Brain-Forms, especially in relation to Mental Status: A Study on Brain-Surface Morphology". Journal of Mental Science. 44 (184): 17–45. doi:10.1192/bjp.44.184.17.
- —— (1906). "Discussion on General Paralysis. Opening Paper. The Delimitation of General Paralysis of the Insane". The British Medical Journal. 2 (2387): 741–744. JSTOR 20291297. PMC 2382371.
- —— (1909). "Katatonia: In Relation to Dementia Præcox". Journal of Mental Science. 55 (228): 22–36. doi:10.1192/bjp.55.228.22.
