= William Julius Mickle =

Scottish poet (1734–1788)

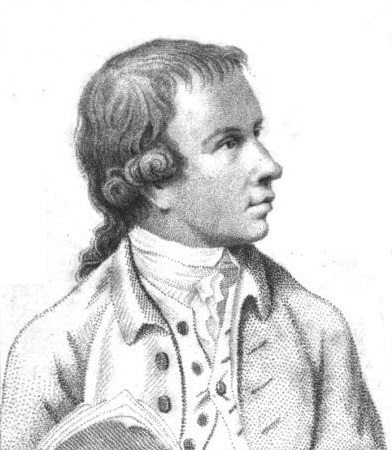
- Born: 29 September 1734; Langholm
- Died: 28 October 1788 (aged 54); Forest Hill, London
- Occupation: Poet
- Family: William Julius Mickle (great-grandson)

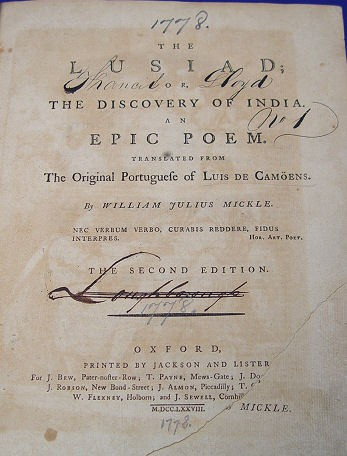
The ''Lusiad'', translated into English by William Julius Mickle

William Julius Mickle (29 September 1734 – 28 October 1788) was a Scottish poet.

== Biography ==
Born in Langholm on 29 September 1738 to a minister, and educated at the Edinburgh high school. Mickle was for some time a brewer in Edinburgh, but failed. He moved to England where he worked as a corrector for the Clarendon Press at Oxford. In 1771–75 Mickle lodged at the manor house in Forest Hill, Oxfordshire. Mickle had various literary failures and minor successes until, while at Forest Hill, he produced his translation of the Lusiad, from the Portuguese of Luís de Camões. This was a success that brought him both fame and money.

In 1777, he went to Portugal, where he king gave him a public reception. In 1784, he published the ballad of Cumnor Hall, which suggested to Walter Scott the writing of Kenilworth. He is perhaps best remembered, however, by the beautiful lyric, "There's nae luck aboot the Hoose", which, although claimed by others, is almost certainly his.

In 1781 Mickle married Mary Tomkins, the daughter of his former landlord in Forest Hill, and settled in Wheatley. He died in 1788 while on a visit to his in-laws in Forest Hill, London, and is buried in Forest Hill churchyard.

His namesake and great-grandson, William Julius Mickle, became a distinguished medical doctor.

== Sources ==
- A History of the County of Oxford: Volume 5: Bullingdon Hundred. 1957. pp. 122–134.
