= Lusus =

Mythological founder of Portugal

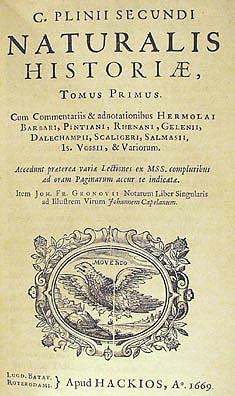
Cover from Naturalis Historia from Pliny the Elder, the work that could have involuntarily been the origin of the mythical character Lusus.

Lusus, in Roman mythology, is a son or companion of Bacchus, god of wine and divine madness. In Portuguese culture, Lusus features in national mythology as the founder and namesake of ancient Lusitania and the father of the Lusitanians, traditional ancestors of the modern Portuguese people.

"Bold though these figures frown, yet bolder far
These godlike heroes shined in ancient war.
In that hoar sire, of mien serene, august,
Lusus behold, no robber-chief unjust;
His cluster'd bough, the same which Bacchus bore,
He waves, the emblem of his care of yore;
The friend of savage man, to Bacchus dear,
The son of Bacchus, or the bold compeer,
What time his yellow locks with vine-leaves curl'd,
The youthful god subdued the savage world,
Bade vineyards glisten o'er the dreary waste,
And humanized the nations as he past.
Lusus, the loved companion of the god,
In Spain's fair bosom fixt his last abode,
Our kingdom founded, and illustrious reign'd
In those fair lawns, the bless'd Elysium feign'd,
Where winding oft the Guadiana roves,
And Douro murmurs through the flowery groves.
Here with his bones he left his deathless fame,
And Lusitania's clime shall ever bear his name."

— Luís Vaz de Camões, The Lusiads, Canto VIII, from strophes 2–4, translated by William Julius Mickle

== Origins of the name ==
With the Roman conquest of the Iberian Peninsula (between 219 and 17 BC), the Roman province of Lusitania was established, broadly in what is today Portugal south of the Douro river together with Extremadura in Spain. There are no historic records of the eponyms Luso or Lusus amongst the Pre-Roman peoples of the Iberian Peninsula (in this specific areas, Celts or pre-Celts).

The etymology of Lusitania, like that of Lusitani, is unclear. The name may be of Celtic origin, or derive from Lucis or Lusis, an ancient people mentioned in Avienius's Ora maritima (4th century AD, but drawing on the Massaliote Periplus of the 6th century BC).

== Origins of the mythological character ==
The entire character of Lusus in fact seems to derive from a mistranslation of an expression in Pliny's Naturalis Historia. Pliny writes: "M. Varro informs us that... the name 'Lusitania' is derived from the games (lusum) of Father Bacchus, or the fury (lyssam) of his frantic attendants, and that Pan was the governor of the whole of it." The mistake would have been in the interpretation of the word lusum as a proper name ("Lusus") rather than as the common noun meaning "games": thus "lusum [...] liberi patris" becomes "Lusus of father Bacchus" rather than "the sportiveness of father Bacchus." The resulting interpretation made "Lusus" a companion or son of Bacchus. It is this interpretation that is seen in Luís Vaz de Camões's Lusiads (canto III, strophe 21):

Esta foi Lusitania, derivada
De Luso, ou Lysa, que de Baccho antigo
Filhos foram, parece, ou companheiros,
E nella então os incolas primeiros.

This Lusitania was; in whom we greet
Lusus, or Lysa, who the offspring were,
Or friends, of ancient Bacchus, as appears,
And her first dwellers in her earliest years.

== In Portugal ==
In The Lusiads by Camões (1572), Lusus was the progenitor of the tribe of the Lusitanians and the founder of Lusitania. For the Portuguese of the 16th century it was important to look at the past prior to the Moorish domination to find the origins of the nationality.

These interpretations would strongly be propagated by the authoritarian right-wing regime of the Estado Novo during the 20th century.

== See also ==
- Brutus of Troy
