= Henrik Kullberg =

Finnish politician (1891–1953)

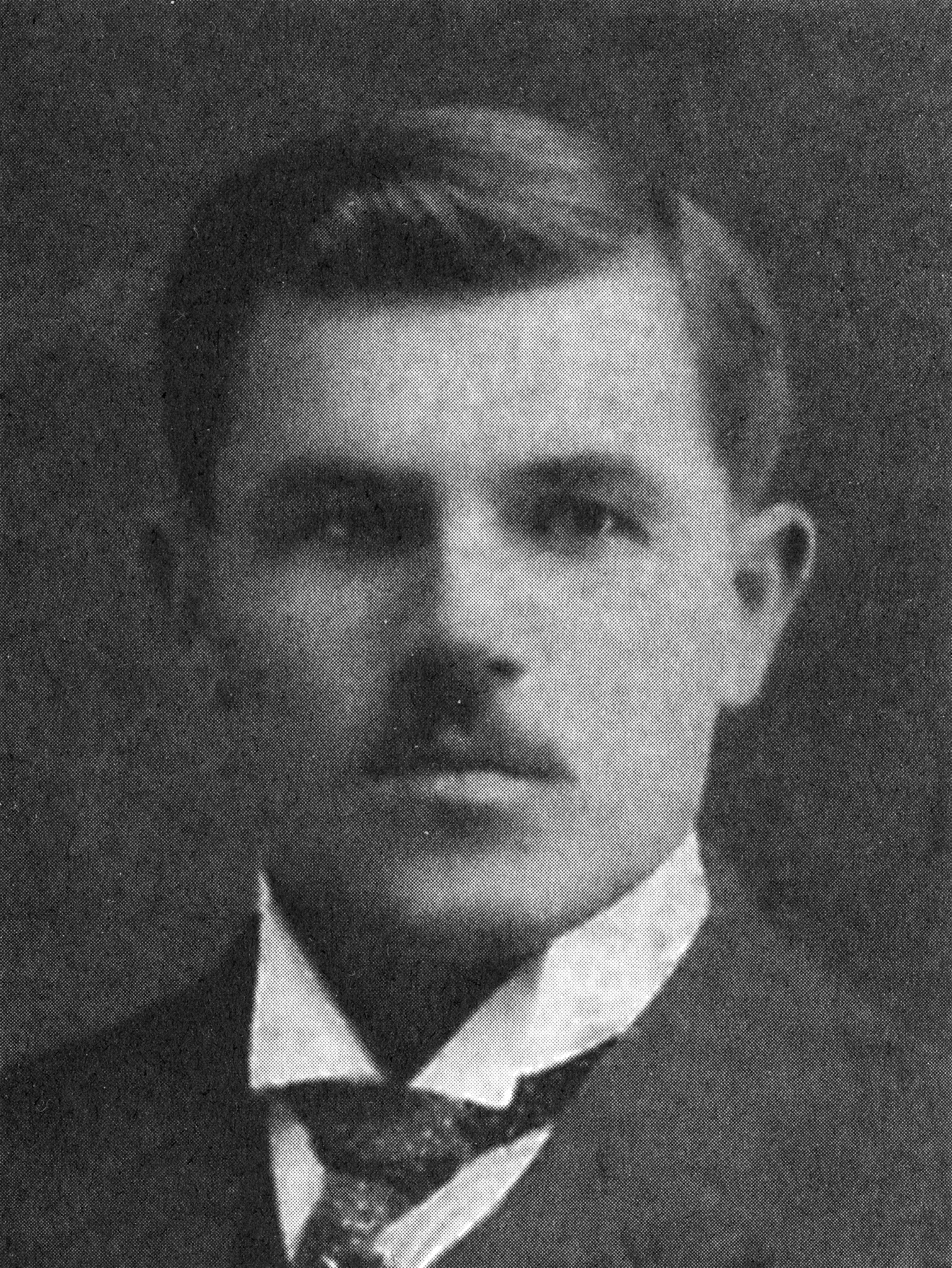
Henrik Kullberg

Henrik Kullberg (27 January 1891, in Ruotsinpyhtää – 4 December 1953) was a Finnish farmer and politician. He served as Deputy Minister of Agriculture from 17 November 1953 until his death only a few weeks later, on 4 December 1953. He was a member of the Parliament of Finland from 1927 to 1930 and again from 1933 until his death, representing the Swedish People's Party of Finland.
