= Micle =

Micle is a Romanian surname. Notable people with the surname include:

- George Micle (born 2001), Romanian footballer
- Ștefan Micle (1820–1879), Romanian physicist and chemist
- Veronica Micle (1850–1889), Romanian poet, wife of Ștefan
