= Munapirtti (village) =

Village in Pyhtää, Finland

Coordinates: 60.434616°N 26.596862°E

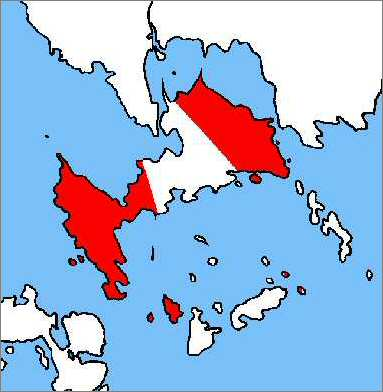
Map showing the two parts of the village

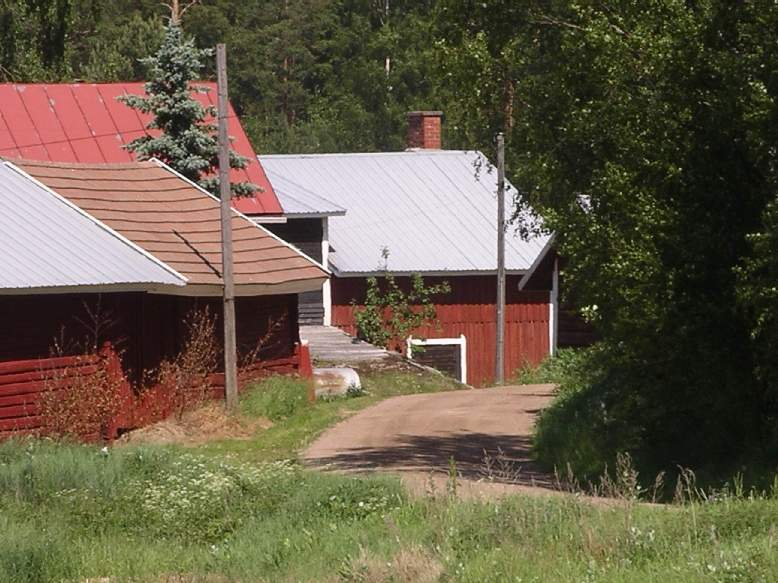
The village road (Byvägen) in Mogenpört

Munapirtti (Swedish: Mogenpört, mo:gen-) is a village on the island of Munapirtti in the municipality of Pyhtää, Finland.

== Name ==
The original form of the name may have been *Muonanpirtti or *Muoninpirtti, where the initial element refers to a variant of the Christian name Simon or Salomon. Alternatively it may refer to former hunting grounds of the Monaala farm in Hattula. Another possibility is that it refers to gathering of bird eggs in the area, like the name of the nearby marsh Munasuo.

The Swedish name Mogenpört is derived from the Finnish name.
