= Pyhtää =

Pyhtää Pyhtää – Pyttis
- Municipality
- Pyhtään kunta Pyttis kommun
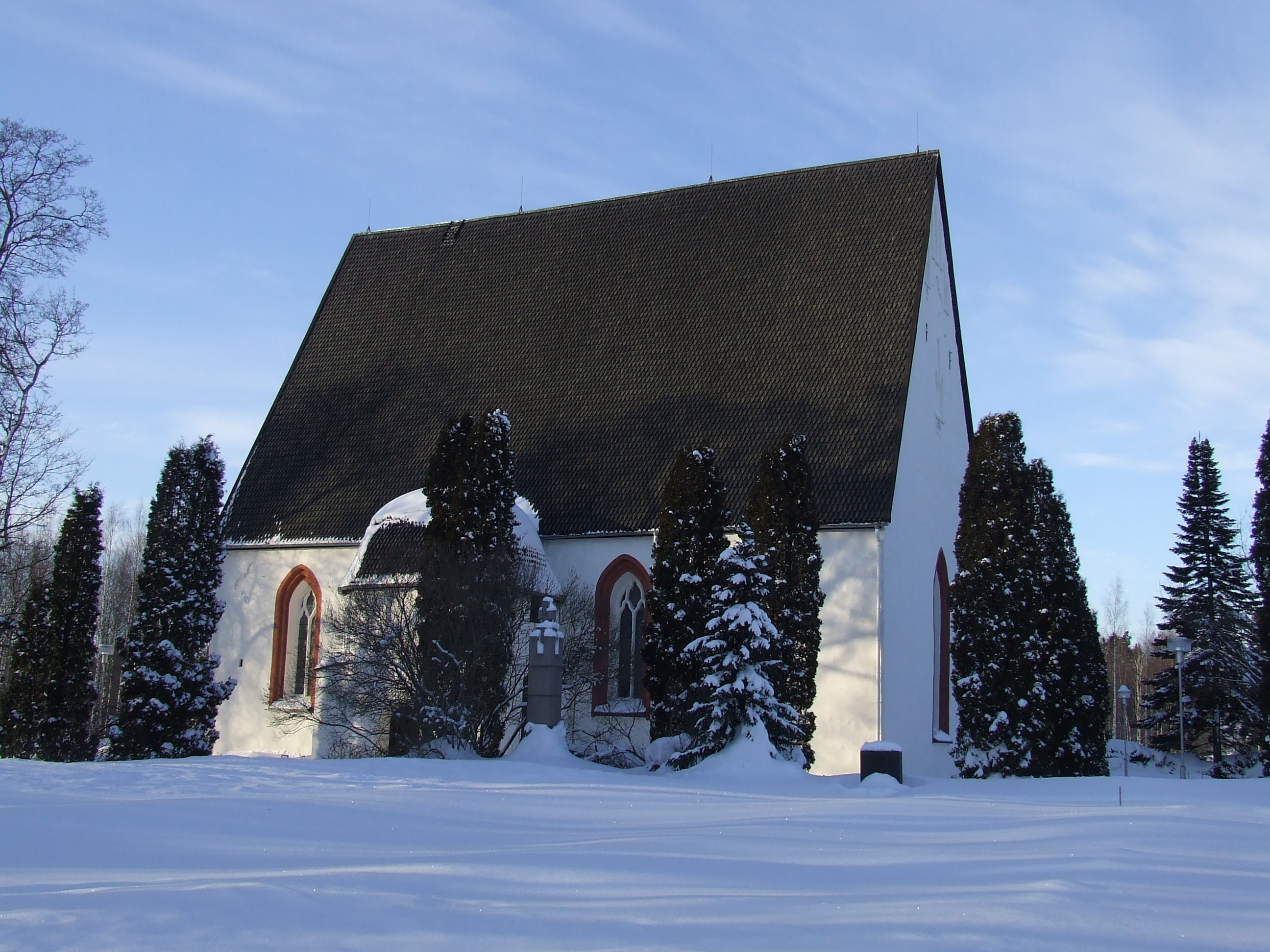
- The medieval St. Henry's church

- Coat of arms

- Location of Pyhtää in Finland
- Interactive map of Pyhtää
- Coordinates: 60°30′N 026°33′E
- Country: Finland
- Region: Kymenlaakso
- Sub-region: Kotka-Hamina
- Founded: ca. 1380

Government
  - Municipality manager: Olli Ikonen

Area (2018-01-01)
  - Total: 780.96 km^{2} (301.53 sq mi)
  - Land: 324.63 km^{2} (125.34 sq mi)
  - Water: 456.24 km^{2} (176.16 sq mi)
  - Rank: 228th largest in Finland

Population (2025-12-31)
  - Total: 5,016
  - Rank: 165th largest in Finland
  - Density: 15.45/km^{2} (40.0/sq mi)

Population by native language
  - Finnish: 88.4% (official)
  - Swedish: 6.5% (official)
  - Others: 5.1%

Population by age
  - 0 to 14: 16.2%
  - 15 to 64: 56.9%
  - 65 or older: 26.9%
- Time zone: UTC+02:00 (EET)
  - Summer (DST): UTC+03:00 (EEST)
- Climate: Dfb
- Website: www.pyhtaa.fi

Pyhtää (Swedish: Pyttis) is a municipality of Finland. It is located in the Kymenlaakso region, 27 kilometres (17 mi) west of the city of Kotka.

== Overview ==
The municipality has a population of 5,016 (31 December 2025) and covers an area of 780.96 square kilometres (301.53 sq mi) of which 456.24 km^{2} (176.16 sq mi) is water. The population density is 15.45 inhabitants per square kilometre (40.0/sq mi).

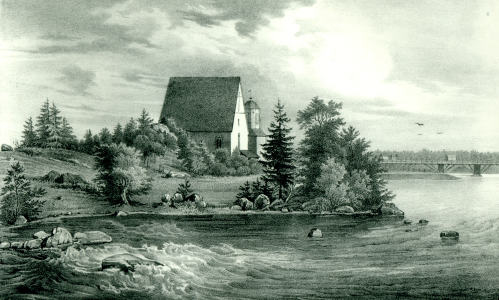
The medieval church of Pyhtää. Lithography by Johan Knutson, mid 19th century.

The medieval church (as opposed to the municipality) is situated in the village of Itäkirkonkylä ("East Church Village"). During the Reformation, the rather beautiful and moving pictures on the walls were whitewashed over. Some years ago, they were rediscovered and the whitewash removed. The village lies just to the East of the westernmost tributary of the Kymi River and was at one time on the border between Russia and Sweden established by the Treaty of Åbo in 1743. Indeed, on the Western side of the river is a municipality called Ruotsinpyhtää ("Swedish Pyhtää") known as Strömfors in Swedish.

Pyhtää is a bilingual municipality with Finnish and Swedish as its official languages. The population consists of 88% Finnish speakers, 6% Swedish speakers, and 5% speakers of other languages.

In the 1980s, salmon soup, salted herrings and clot soup (klimppisoppa) were named as Pyhtää's traditional parish dishes.

== Villages ==
- Heinlahti (Swedish: Heinlax)
- Hinkaböle
- Hirvikoski (earlier Österhirvikoski)
- Itäkirkonkylä (Swedish: Österkyrkoby)
- Itämyllynkylä (Swedish: Österkvarnby)
- Kaunissaari (Swedish: Fagerö)
- Kiviniemi (Swedish: Stensnäs, earlier Lillkuppis)
- Loosari (Swedish: Klåsarö)
- Länsikirkonkylä (Swedish: Västerkyrkoby)
- Länsikylä (Swedish: Västerby, earlier Västerkuppis)
- Länsimyllynkylä (Swedish: Västerkvarnby)
- Malmi (Swedish: Malm)
- Munapirtti (Swedish: Mogenpört)
- Pirtnuora (Swedish: Pörtnor)
- Siltakylä (Swedish: Broby, earlier Storkuppis)
- Suur-Ahvenkoski (Swedish: Storabborrfors)
- Tuuski (Swedish: Tuskas; de jure a part of Munapirtti)
- Purola

== Twinnings ==
- Haljala Parish, Estonia (since 1989)
