= Mickel =

Mickel is a surname. Notable people with the surname include:

- Andrew Mickel (born 1979), former resident of Springfield, Ohio
- Charlie Mickel (born 2004), American freestyle skier
- Clarence E. Mickel (1892–1982), American entomologist
- Finlay Mickel (born 1977), Scottish skier
- John Mickel (racing driver) (born 1971), stock car racer and commentator
- John Mickel (politician) (born 1953), Australian politician
- John T. Mickel (1934–2024), American botanist

== See also ==
- Mickels
