= List of World Heritage Sites in Finland =

Location of World Heritage Sites in Finland. The green dot indicates the natural site, the blue dots indicate the sites of the Struve Geodetic Arc, and the yellow dots indicate the Aalto Works.

The United Nations Educational, Scientific and Cultural Organization (UNESCO) World Heritage Sites are places of importance to cultural or natural heritage as described in the UNESCO World Heritage Convention, established in 1972. Finland accepted the convention on 4 March 1987, making its historical sites eligible for inclusion on the list. The first two sites added to the list were Old Rauma and the Fortress of Suomenlinna, both in 1991, at the 15th Session of the World Heritage Committee, held in Carthage, Tunisia. Further sites were added in 1994, 1996, 1999, 2005, 2006, and 2026.

There are eight World Heritage Sites in Finland, seven of which are classified as cultural sites according to the UNESCO criteria, and one natural site, the High Coast / Kvarken Archipelago. This is a transnational site and is shared with Sweden. The Swedish part, the High Coast, was listed individually in 2000; the Kvarken Archipelago was added in 2006. There is another transnational site in Finland, the Struve Geodetic Arc, a cultural site listed in 2005, which is shared with nine other countries. In addition to its World Heritage Sites, Finland also maintains one property on its tentative list.

== World Heritage Sites ==
UNESCO lists sites under ten criteria; each entry must meet at least one of the criteria. Criteria i through vi are cultural, and vii through x are natural.

* Transnational site

Site	Image	Location	Year listed	UNESCO data	Description
Old Rauma	A square and cobblestone streets in Old Rauma	Rauma	1991	582; iv, v (cultural)	Old Rauma is the medieval central part of the town of Rauma at the Gulf of Bothnia. It consists of around 600 wooden houses which are now used both for residential and commercial purposes. The Church of the Holy Cross dates to the 16th century while the rest of the urban area has been rebuilt after fires and dates to the 17th to 19th centuries. Minor boundary modifications took place in 2009.
Fortress of Suomenlinna	Fortress of Suomenlinna from above	Helsinki	1991	583; iv (cultural)	The fortress, which is built on six islands at the entrance to the port of Helsinki, was built by Sweden in the 18th century to defend against the Russian Empire. There are 200 buildings and the defensive walls stretch over 6 kilometres (3.7 mi). After World War II, the military role of the fortress declined. It was repurposed for public use and is now a popular tourist destination.
Petäjävesi Old Church	Petäjävesi Old Church, bell tower on the left, a cemetery in front.	Petäjävesi, Central Finland	1994	584; iv (cultural)	This church is a typical example of the architectural tradition of wooden churches in northern Europe. It was built between 1763 and 1765 and demonstrates the masterful application of European architectural influences to a structure made of logs. The centrally planned church shows Renaissance influences while the steep roof recalls the Gothic tradition. The bell tower was added in 1821. The church is well preserved due to the fact that it was abandoned in the late 19th century, as the new parish church was built, and did not suffer from major alterations such as the installation of heating systems. It was carefully restored after 1920. The church still holds services regularly in summer.
Verla Groundwood and Board Mill	Verla groundwood and board mill museum, built in red brick.	Kouvola (Jaala), Kymenlaakso	1996	751; iv (cultural)	The mill and the surrounding residential area represent a type of small-scale rural industrial settlement common in the 19th and early 20th centuries, associated with pulp, paper, and board production. These types of settlements flourished in northern Europe and North America, where the raw materials were abundant. The Verla Mill operated until 1964, after which it was converted into a museum.
Bronze Age Burial Site of Sammallahdenmäki	Sammallahdenmäki cairn. Forest in the background.	Rauma	1999	579; iii, iv (cultural)	This burial site dates back to the Bronze Age and the early Iron Age, from 1500 to 500 BCE. The site includes 33 burial cairns in several clusters. The cairns are connected to sun worship, a religion that spread to Finland from Scandinavia. Originally, they were built near the coast but are now further inland due to the rising land.
Struve Geodetic Arc*	Alatornio Church, side view. Cemetery in front.	Enontekiö, Ylitornio, Tornio, Korpilahti, Lapinjärvi, Pyhtää	2005	1187, ii, iii, vi (cultural)	The Struve Geodetic Arc is a series of triangulation points, stretching over a distance of 2,820 kilometres (1,750 mi) from Hammerfest in Norway to the Black Sea. The points were set up in a survey by the astronomer Friedrich Georg Wilhelm Struve who first carried out an accurate measurement of a long segment of a meridian, which helped to establish the size and shape of the Earth. Originally, there were 265 station points. The World Heritage Site includes 34 points in ten countries (north to south: Norway, Sweden, Finland, Russia, Estonia, Latvia, Lithuania, Belarus, Moldova, Ukraine), six of which are in Finland. Alatornio Church, one of the station points in Finland, is pictured.
High Coast / Kvarken Archipelago*	De Geer moraines at Kvarken, sea and surrounding vegetation	Kvarken	2006	898bis; viii (natural)	This is an extension of the High Coast site in Sweden, originally listed in 2000. Both the High Coast and the Kvarken Archipelago are situated in the Gulf of Bothnia and include thousands of islands. The area shows prominent effects of the post-glacial rebound, the rising of the land following the melting of the continental ice sheet after the Last Glacial Maximum (thus removing the weight of the glaciers), 10,000 to 24,000 years ago. The rising, in some places up to almost 300 metres (980 ft), is constantly changing the landscape.
Aalto Works	Paimio Sanatorium building, Modernist architecture	Helsinki, Imatra, Jyväskylä, Kotka, Muuratsalo, Paimio, Pori, Seinäjoki	2026	1752; ii (cultural)	This site comprises 13 works by prominent Finnish Modernist architects Alvar Aalto, Aino Aalto, and Elissa Aalto: the Paimio Sanatorium (pictured); Aalto Atelier, Aalto House, Finlandia Hall, House of Culture, and Social Insurance Institution Main Office in Helsinki; Church of Three Crosses in Imatra; Aalto Campus, Experimental House, and Säynätsalo Town Hall in Jyväskylä; Sunila Housing Area in Kotka; Aalto Centre in Seinäjoki; and Villa Mairea in Pori.

== Tentative list ==
In addition to sites inscribed on the World Heritage List, member states can maintain a list of tentative sites that they may consider for nomination. Nominations for the World Heritage List are only accepted if the site was previously listed on the tentative list. As of 2026, Finland lists one property on its tentative list.

Site	Image	Location	Year listed	UNESCO criteria	Description
The Ringed Seal Archipelagos of Lake Saimaa*	Sunset at the Lake Saimaa	Ristiina	2021	ix, x (natural)	Lake Saimaa, located in south-eastern Finland, the largest lake in Finland at 4,400 square kilometres (1,700 sq mi), is the only habitat of the Saimaa ringed seal (Phoca hispida saimensis). This seal subspecies has become landlocked and has adapted to the freshwater environment following the end of the last glaciation.

== See also ==
- Tourism in Finland
