= Villa Aalto =

The Aalto House
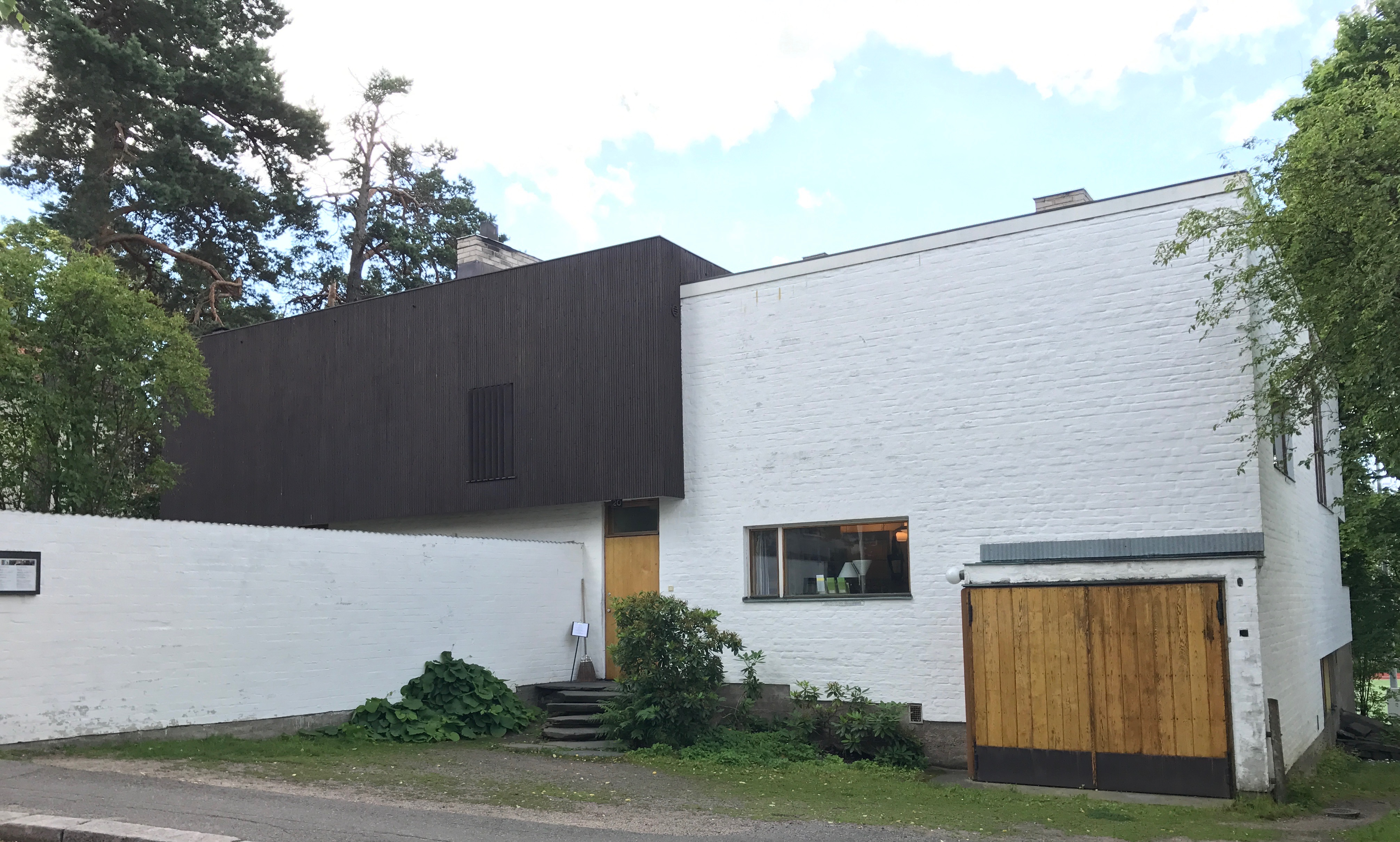
- Interactive map of the The Aalto House area

General information
- Location: Riihitie 20, Munkkiniemi, Helsinki
- Coordinates: 60°11′48.5″N 24°52′35.3″E
- Completed: August 1936
- Owner: Alvar Aalto Foundation

Design and construction
- Architects: Alvar and Aino Aalto

Website
- https://www.alvaraalto.fi/en/location/the-aalto-house/

UNESCO World Heritage Site
- Official name: Aalto House, Helsinki
- Part of: Aalto Works
- Criteria: Cultural: ii
- Reference: 1752
- Inscription: 2026 (48th Session)

The Aalto House (also known as Villa Aalto) is a historic home and former architectural studio located in Munkkiniemi, Helsinki, Finland. Designed by architects Aino Aalto and Alvar Aalto as their joint residence and workspace, it was completed in August 1936.

The L-shaped building features an open plan and functionalist layout, with living quarters on the upper floor and the studio on the ground level. When the firm expanded in 1955, the architectural office moved to the nearby Studio Aalto. Both sites are now managed as public museums by the Alvar Aalto Museum.

In July 2026, the house was designated a UNESCO World Heritage Site as part of the Aalto Works entry.

== Background ==
Alvar Aalto became acquainted with Munkkiniemi and developed a liking of it when he was drafting a proposition for building along the shores of Laajalahti Bay for the company of M.G. Stenius. The proposition never materialised; it would have meant that the shores would have been lined with long, white apartment buildings. However, in 1934 Aino and Alvar Aalto acquired a lot in Munkkiniemi, in a place that was still nearly in its natural state, and designed for the lot a house which was completed in August 1936, roughly at the same time as the Viipuri Library. When the house was under construction, passers-by are said to have wondered what kind of a henhouse it was going to be, as the house was radically different from anything that had been built in Munkkiniemi by that time.

== Features of the house ==
The house was designed to be both a home for the family and the studio of an architect. The slender office wing is in white-painted, lightly rendered brickwork. The positioning of the windows still shows clear hints of functionalism. The residential part is clad with slender, dark-stained timber battens. The roof is flat and on the courtyard side there is a large terrace opening up to the south.

The façade is toward the street, it is closed-off and harsh, but it is rendered softer by climbing plants and a slate path leading up to the front door. The house anticipates the later Villa Mairea, and it bears hints of a “new” Aalto, of romantic functionalism. This is seen in the plentiful use of wood as a finishing material and in the four fireplaces built of brick. But in contrast to Villa Mairea, this house is not a luxurious residence but a cozy and intimate living quarters, in which simple, uncluttered materials are used.

Later, in 1955, Studio Aalto was completed, also in the Tiilimäki neighbourhood of Munkkiniemi, but the architect is known to have enjoyed working in Villa Aalto even after that.

== Details of and episodes at the private home ==
The living room is dominated by a grand piano, which Aino Aalto is known to have enjoyed playing. The whole interior is designed by Aalto, except for three Renaissance chairs, which were a memory from their honeymoon trip to Italy.

Many times tourists, who came from far-away countries tried to peek at the house from a nearby sports field. The locals knew that Aalto and his wife liked to take “open air baths” naked in the yard when services were held at the nearby church. Especially Japanese tourists tried to climb over the fence and into the garden, and this habit of the resident couple came as a surprise to them. The neighbours could always hear it when this reality dawned upon the tourists. The locals were under the impression that the Aalto's found all this amusing.

Aalto lived in the house up to his death in 1976, and after this his second wife Elissa Aalto lived there until her death in 1994. The house was protected by a law in 1982, and it was renovated inside and out in the early years of the new millennium, funded by the Finnish Ministry of Education and Culture and the city of Helsinki.

== Open hours ==
The house is open much the same as any museum in the country. Guided tours are given regularly, more often in the summer (several times a day in August) and less so in the winter (on only one day each week in December and January).
