= Aino Aalto =

Finnish architect and designer (1894–1949)

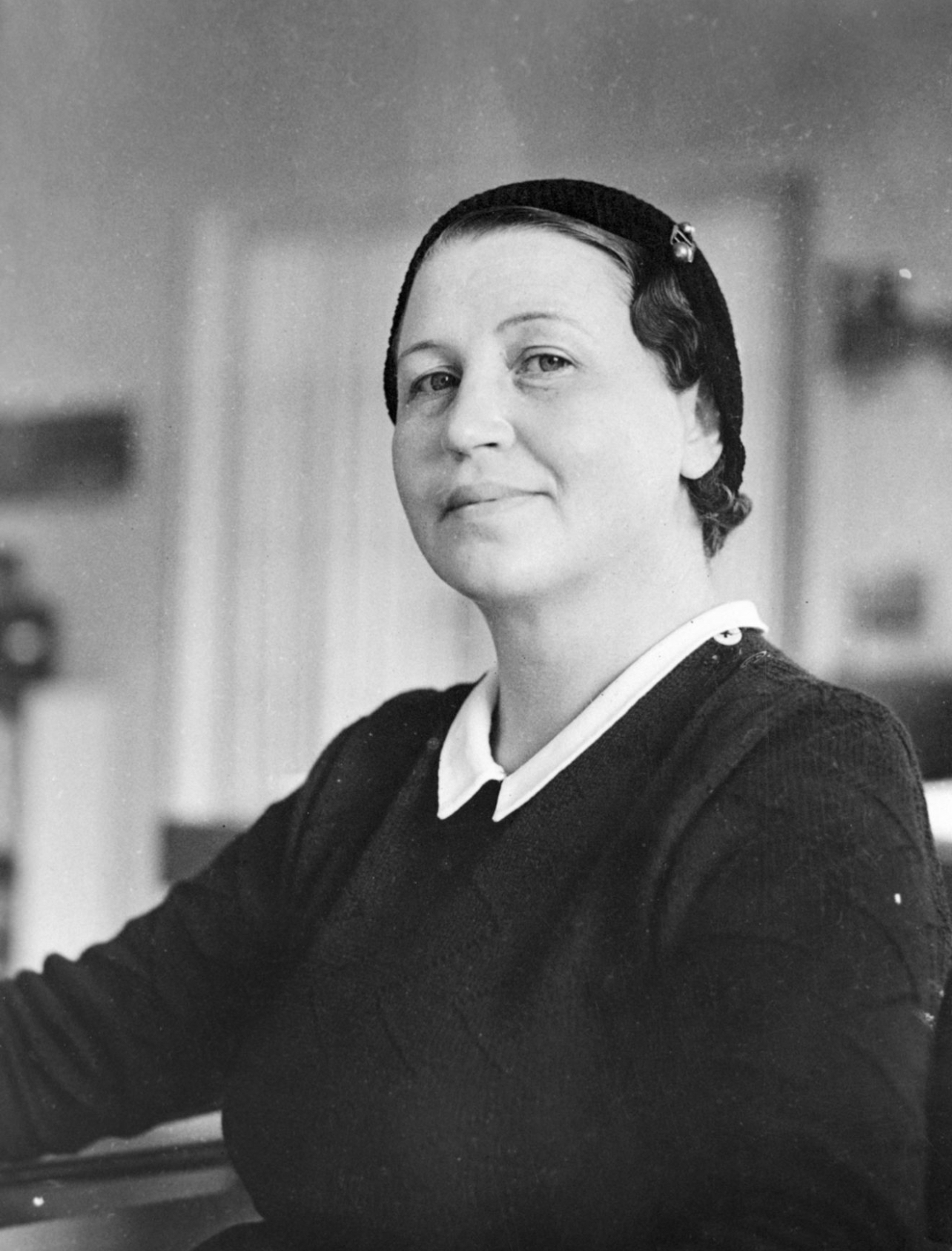
- Aino Marsio-Aalto
- Born: Aino Maria Mandelin; 25 January 1894; Helsinki, Grand Duchy of Finland, Russian Empire
- Died: 13 January 1949 (aged 54); Helsinki, Finland
- Other names: Aino Marsio Aalto, Aino Aalto, Aino Maria Marsio-Aalto
- Education: Helsingin Suomalainen Tyttökoulu; Helsinki University of Technology
- Occupations: Architect, designer
- Spouse: Alvar Aalto (m. 1925)
- Children: 2 (Johan Henrik Hamilkar and Johanna [“Hanni”])
- Practice: Co-founder of Artek

Aino Maria Marsio-Aalto (born Aino Maria Mandelin; 25 January 1894 – 13 January 1949) was a Finnish architect and a pioneer of Scandinavian design. She is known as the design partner of architect Alvar Aalto, with whom she worked for 25 years, and as a co-founder with him, Maire Gullichsen, and Nils-Gustav Hahl of the design company Artek, collaborating on many its most well-known designs. As Artek's first artistic director, her creative output spanned textiles, lamps, glassware, and buildings. Her work is in the permanent collection of the Museum of Modern Art (MoMA) in New York, and MoMA has included her work in nine exhibitions, the first of which was Aalto: Architecture and Furniture in 1938. Other major exhibitions were at the Barbican Art Gallery in London and Chelsea Space in London. Aino Aalto has been exhibited with Pablo Picasso.

== Biography ==
Aino Mandelin was born in Helsinki. Her family lived in a co-operative apartment building in Helsinki where she was introduced to neighboring master carpenters and joiners whom she later apprenticed for. Aino completed her school education in 1913 at the Helsingin Suomalainen Tyttökoulu (Helsinki Finnish Girls' School). She began studies in architecture that same year at the Institute of Technology, Helsinki, and qualified as an architect in 1920. Aino graduated with a handful of other female architects including Salme Setälä. She also met her future husband, Alvar Aalto, when they were both students. In 1920 she went to work for architect Oiva Kallio in Helsinki. In 1923 she moved to the city of Jyväskylä to work in the office of architect Gunnar Achilles Wahlroos, but the following year switched to working in the office of Alvar Aalto. Mandelin married Alvar Aalto in 1925. The Aaltos spent their honeymoon in northern Italy. It was common at that time for young architects in Scandinavia to travel to Italy to study the vernacular architecture, which had a profound influence on Scandinavian architecture during the 1920s, flourishing in the so-called Nordic Classicism style.

The Aaltos moved their office to Turku in 1927, and started collaborating with architect Erik Bryggman. The office moved again in 1933 to Helsinki. The Aaltos designed and built a joint house-office (1935–36) for themselves in Munkkiniemi, a suburb of Helsinki, but later (1954–55) had a purpose-built office built in the same neighbourhood.

Aino Aalto's role in the design of the architecture attributed to Alvar Aalto has never been specifically verified. Their early built works were mostly small-scale buildings, especially summer villas, designed in the style of Nordic Classicism. Aino’s first project that was accredited entirely to her was Villa Flora (1926, extended 1938) the Aalto family's holiday home in Alajärvi, South Ostrobothnia, which expressed the efficiency of modernism and the simplicity of rural Finnish life. Aino was not completely on board with the ideologies of modernism spreading throughout Europe. Instead she designed homes for domesticity rather than an architectural ideology. She paid attention to the comfort level of a home and used materiality and furnishings to achieve a warm and practical space that was rare in 20th-century modernism.

It is known that in the design work she concentrated more on the design of interiors (such as the Villa Mairea in Noormarkku of 1937–39), but also furniture (such as the Paimio Sanatorium of 1927–29). In 1935 the Aaltos, together with Maire Gullichsen (chief client for the Villa Mairea) and Nils-Gustav Hahl, founded Artek, a firm selling lighting fixtures and furniture designed by the Aaltos. It has recently been discovered that it was Aino who completed the first interior design work commissioned through Artek, the Viipuri Library in 1936. Aino was the head designer of Artek and later became the managing director. Artek still produces Aalto furniture but is now owned by a private company. In the early years of Artek, furniture designs and standards were created and revised by Aino and of the hundreds of designs, only a few are by Alvar Aalto. She also oversaw commissions for interiors, lighting, screens, textiles and other household objects. Under Aino's leadership Artek completed more than eighty interiors. Aino was a versatile designer well before the inception of Artek. Her series of pressed glass objects was awarded a prize at the Milan Triennial in 1936. In the early years of their marriage and design partnership Aino Aalto and her husband would enter architectural competitions with their own separate entries. In the mid-1920s the Aaltos became the first architects in Finland to adopt the purified Functionalist style of architecture coming from central Europe. In Aino Aalto's own individual work this comes out in her entry for the Finnish pavilion for the 1939 New York World's Fair, the first prize for which was won by Alvar Aalto. Aino's work was always measured against the achievements of her husband and she often stood by while Alvar received recognition for their joint projects.

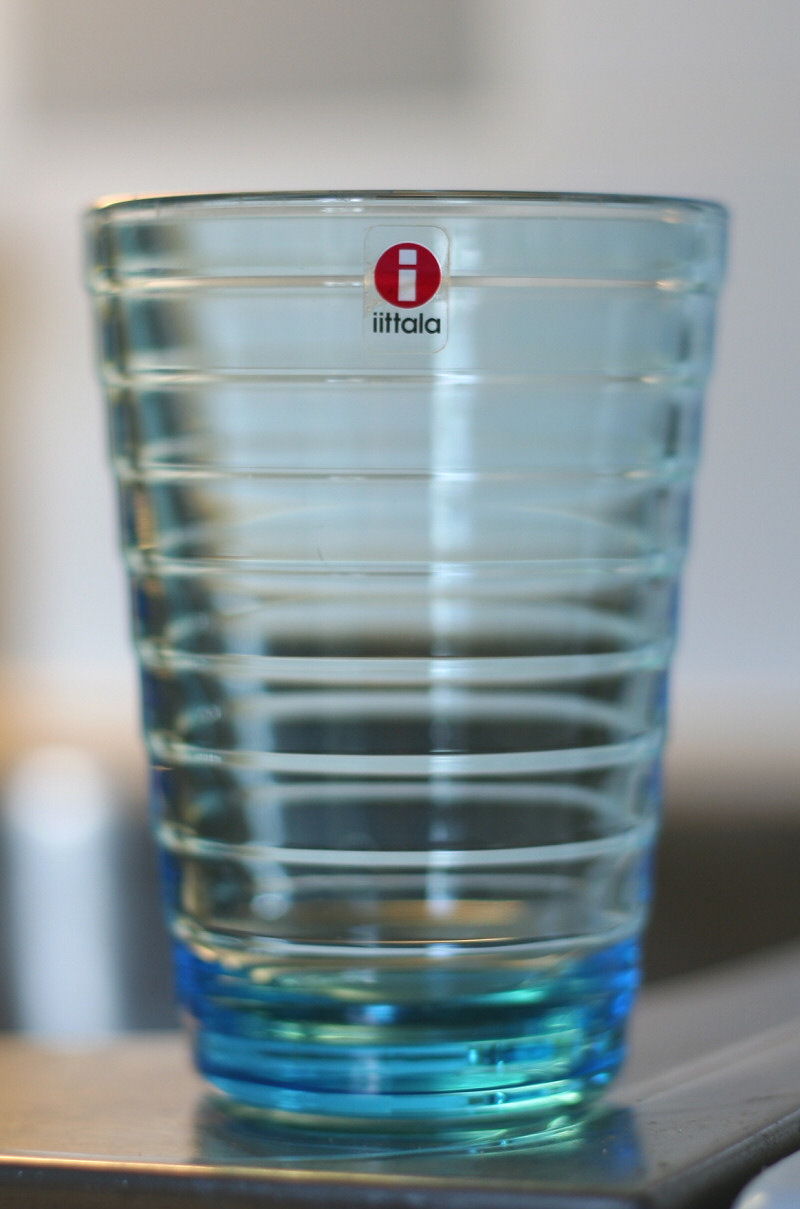
Iittala glass designed by Aino Aalto

Aino Aalto also designed several glassware objects for the Finnish company Iittala, who made household objects. Her most famous glass design is still on sale, and slightly different copies made by companies such as IKEA are widespread. Aalto's "Bölgeblick" design serves as inspiration for a line of dinnerware produced by Iittala. She also collaborated with her husband on the design of the celebrated Savoy Vase in 1936.

Aalto worked in the Artek office until 1949, when she died of cancer. Aino set the tone for the Artek's creative and commercial approach which is still intact.

In 2004 an exhibition and book (edited by Ulla Kinnunen) was arranged at the Alvar Aalto Museum, Jyväskylä, Finland, featuring the life's work of Aino Aalto.

On 26th July 2026, Aalto's work was inscribed on the UNESCO World Heritage List. The series, named Aalto Works, consists of 13 architecturally significant sites designed by Alvar Aalto, Aino Aalto, and Elissa Aalto.

== Exhibitions ==
2021 Design for Modern Life MoMA, New York, USA

2018 Modern Couples – Art, Intimacy and the Avant-garde Barbican Art Gallery London, United Kingdom

2017 Aino Aalto stars in the Children’s Scale exhibition Alvar Aalto Museum, Jyväskylä, Finland

2016/2017 How Should We Live? Propositions for the Modern Interior MoMA, New York, USA

2016 Artek and the Aaltos: Creating a Modern World Bard Graduate Center, New York, New York, USA

2014 Nordic Art and Vintage Design Galerie Christian Roellin, St. Gallen, Switzerland

2013–2014 Designing Modern Women 1890–1990 MoMA, New York, USA

2009 INTO THE WOODS: An Exploration of itala Chelsea space London, United Kingdom

2006 Art & Technology. Moments in Artek history Alvar Aalto Museum Jyväskylä, Finland

2006 Artist’s Choice: Herzog & de Meuron, Perception Restrained MoMA, New York, USA

2004 Humble Masterpieces MoMA, New York, USA

2004 Solo Exhibition at Alvar Aalto Museum Jyväskylä, Finland
