= Aalto Works =

World Heritage Sites in Finland

Aalto Works

Aalto Works is a series of 13 architectural sites across Finland designed by Alvar Aalto, Aino Aalto, and Elissa Aalto. Representing humanistic modernism, an approach focused on achieving harmony between buildings and the surrounding nature, the series was recognised as UNESCO World Heritage Site in July 2026 under criterion ii. According to UNESCO, "the works express a human‑centred, site‑specific, and empathetic vision that distinguishes Finland’s contribution to modern architecture." Prior to this, only two series of buildings designed by individual architects had achieved World Heritage status.

== Sites ==
The following sites are part of Aalto Works World Heritage Site.

Site number	Site	Photo	Location	Years
001	Sunila Housing Area		Kotka, Kymenlaakso	1936–1938, 1947, 1951–1954
002	Paimio Sanatorium		Paimio Finland Proper	1929–1933
003	Säynätsalo Town Hall		Säynätsalo, Jyväskylä, Central Finland	1949–1952
004	Aalto Centre		Seinäjoki, South Ostrobothnia	1951–1987
005	Social Insurance Institution Main Office		Helsinki Uusimaa,	1953–1957
006	Finlandia Hall		Helsinki, Uusimaa	1962/1967–1975
007	Aalto House		Helsinki, Uusimaa	1935–1936
008	Aalto Atelier		Helsinki, Uusimaa	1954–1955, 1962–1963
009	Muuratsalo Experimental House		Muuratsalo, Säynätsalo, Central Finland	1952–1954
010	House of Culture		Helsinki, Uusimaa	1952–1958
011	Aalto Campus, University of Jyväskylä		Jyväskylä, Central Finland	1951–1971
012	Church of Three Crosses		Imatra, South Karelia	1956–1958
013	Villa Mairea		Noormarkku, Pori, Satakunta	1938–1939
