= Alvar Aalto Museum =

Museum in Finland

The Alvar Aalto Museum
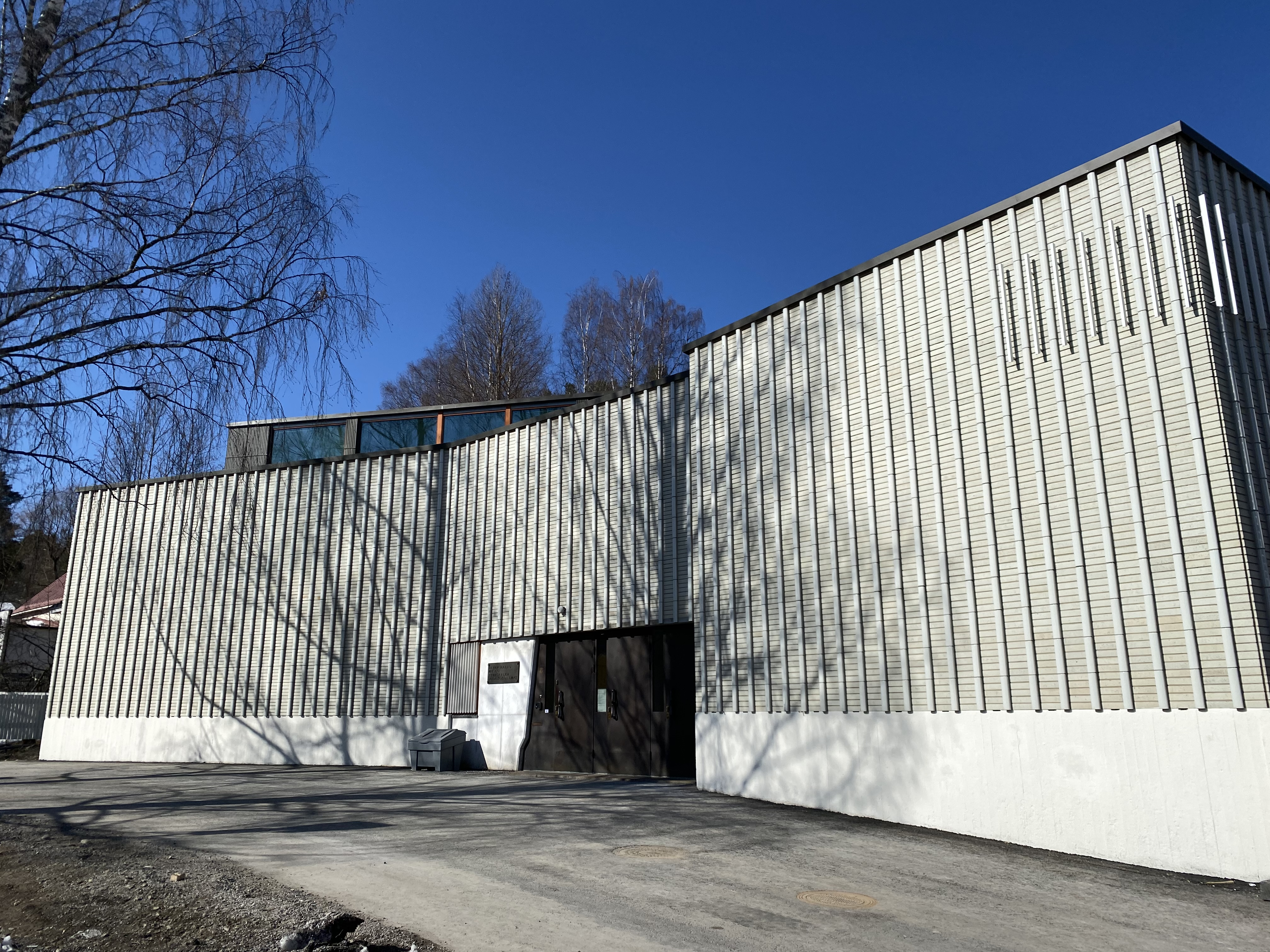
- Alvar Aalto Museum
- Established: 1966 to foster the legacy of the architecture of Alvar Aalto.
- Location: Jyväskylä, Finland
- Coordinates: 62°14′00″N 25°43′52″E
- Collections: 1,500 items: furniture, light fittings, glass art, drawings contain ca. 200,000 original drawings and documents related to his designs

The Alvar Aalto Museum is a Finnish museum operating in two cities, Jyväskylä and Helsinki, in two locations each, dedicated to architect and designer Alvar Aalto. All four locations are open to the public. They are:

- The Alvar Aalto Museum in Jyväskylä, which is a museum specialised in architecture and design and functions as the national and international centre on all things related to Aalto (in more detail below).
- The Muuratsalo Experiential House (in more detail below)
- Villa Aalto in Munkkiniemi, Helsinki
- Studio Aalto, also in Munkkiniemi, Helsinki

== The Alvar Aalto Museum in Jyväskylä ==
This museum, which is specialised in architecture and design, is located in Jyväskylä. It was founded in 1966 to foster the legacy of the architecture of Alvar Aalto. The museum is located in a building designed by Aalto and completed in 1973.

The museum functions as a centre of information on all things related to Aalto, and it organises exhibitions both in Finland and abroad and produces publications on Alvar Aalto. The museum houses a permanent exhibition on the life work of Alvar Aalto. The current permanent exhibition was opened in 1998, the centennial of Aalto's birth.

The mission of the building heritage section of the museum is the protection of buildings designed by Alvar Aalto. It maintains a national register of protected Aalto buildings and gives expert assistance on matters relating to Aalto buildings. The building heritage section works in close cooperation with the Finnish National Board of Antiquities.

Before the Jyväskylä Art Museum was established in 1998, the Alvar Aalto Museum also hosted exhibitions of visual arts.

== The museum building ==
The museum, designed by Alvar Aalto and completed in 1973, is located on a slope which lies next to Lake Jyväsjärvi. Together with the Museum of Central Finland (Alvar Aalto, 1961), these buildings form a cultural centre in the immediate vicinity of the University of Jyväskylä (Alvar Aalto, 1951–71).

Both museums represent Aalto's "white period". The ten years' difference in the design of the buildings can be seen especially in the façades — the façade of the Museum of Central Finland, rising from a slope of a hill, shows the geometric practicality of early functionalism, whereas the Aalto Museum is more closed in, but at the same time more free in its form.

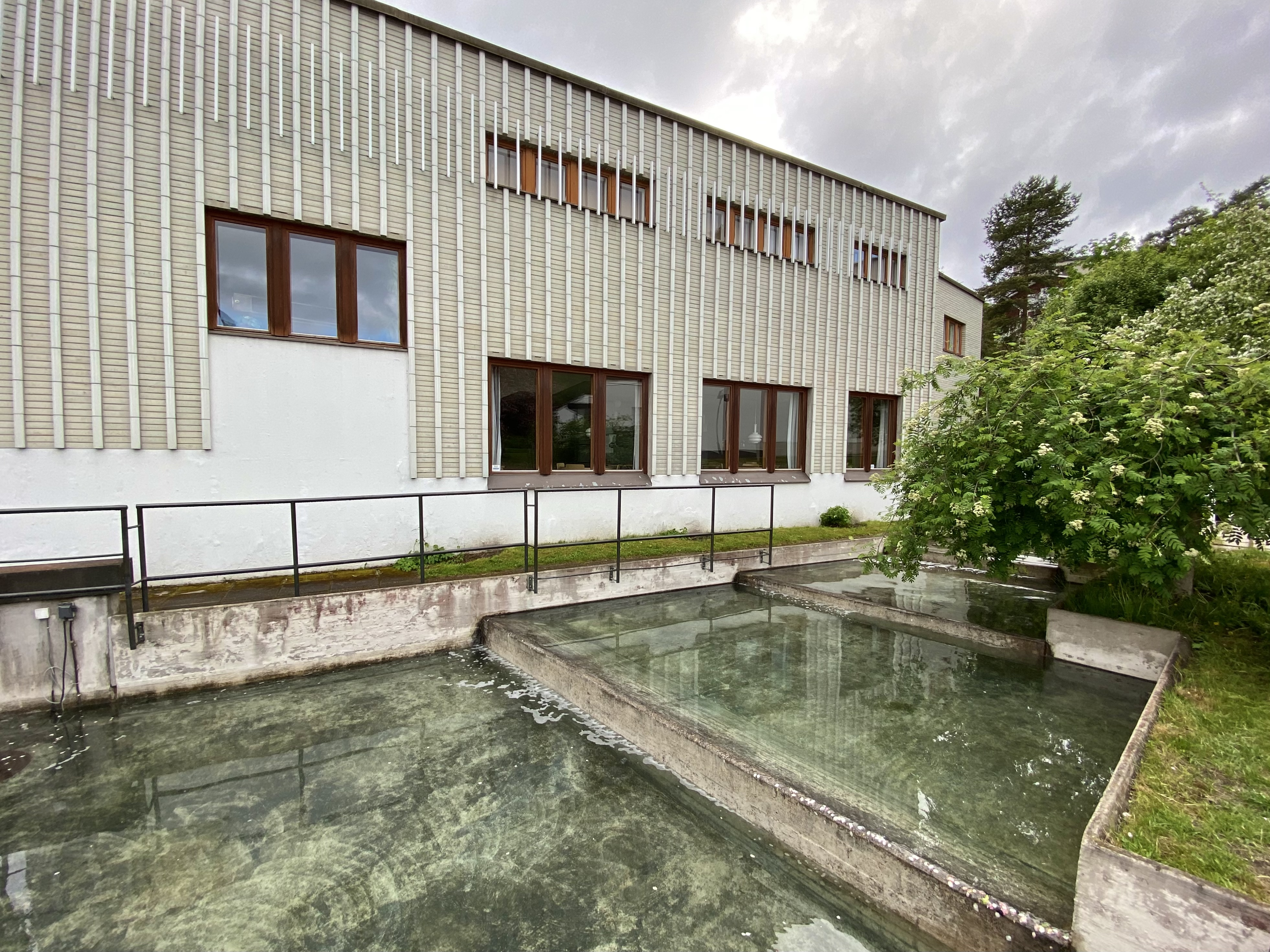
Cascade fountain on the right side of museum building

The outside walls of the Aalto Museum are clad in light-coloured ceramic tiles named "Halla" ("frost"), manufactured by the famous Finnish porcelain manufacturers Arabia. The high concrete socle was painted white. The vertical bands of baton-shaped, glazed tiles divide up the rampart-like elevations to form a relief that gives a strong effect of depth when the surface is washed with light. The rampart-like quality is emphasised by the vertical battens on the roof windows of the exhibition galleries, which cause the roof lights to merge into the façade when looked at from a certain angle.

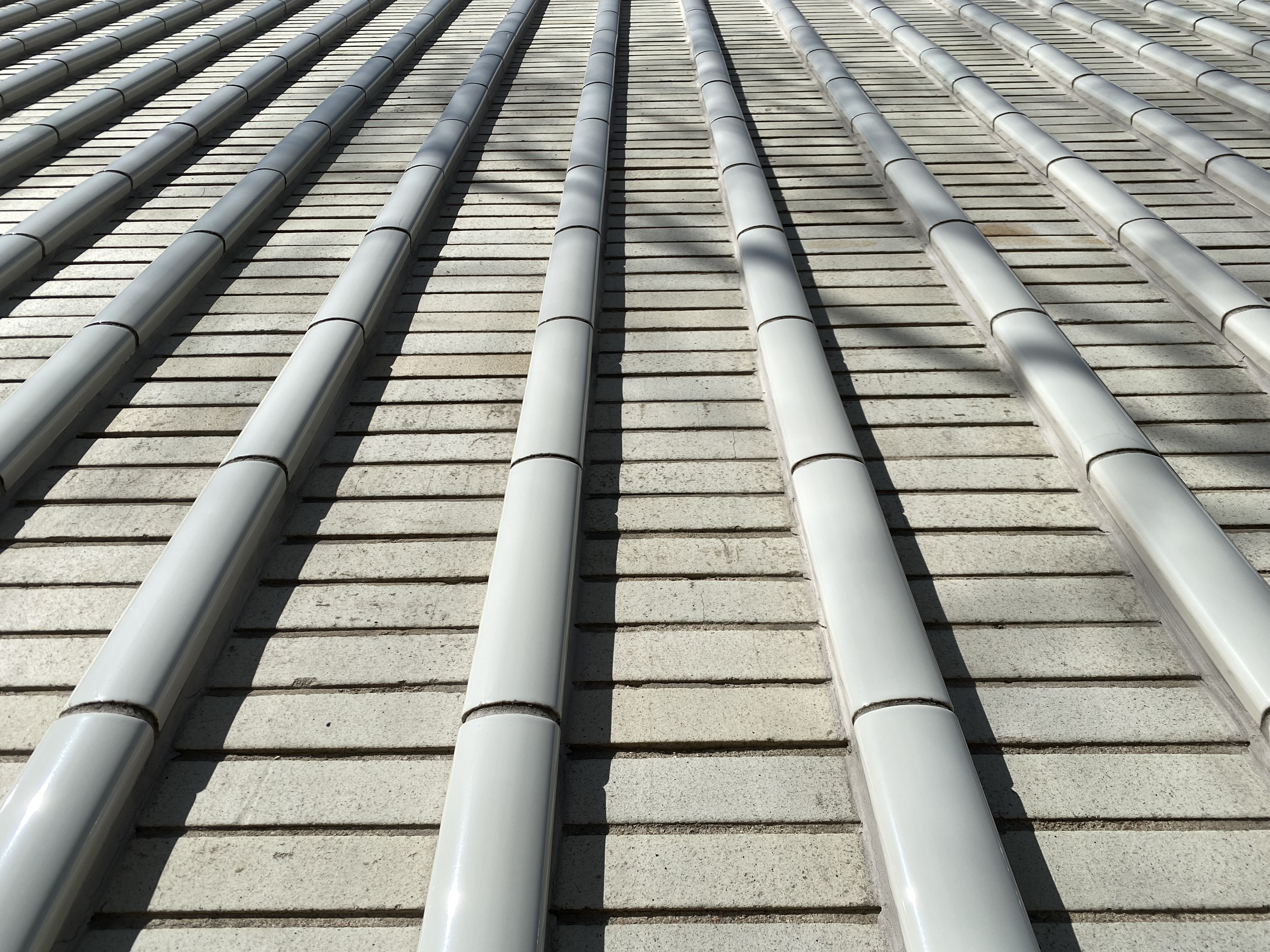
Ceramic tiles Halla ("frost") on the façade

The first floor of the museum contains the foyer and cloakrooms, a museum shop, Café Alvar, a reference library, office and storage spaces and the museum's URBS Workshop. The windows of Café Alvar have a view to a series of open-air pools, with water trickling from one to another along the route of what was once a natural stream.

The exhibition space of the second floor has a total area of 700 m^{2}. The wave-like surface of the back wall contains a trace of the pavilion that Aalto designed for the 1939 New York World's Fair. Light flows in through skylight windows. The second floor houses the permanent exhibition of the museum, entitled Alvar Aalto, Architect, as well as changing exhibitions on architecture and design.

== Collections ==
The collections of the museum amount to nearly 1,500 items: furniture, light fittings, glass art items and other things designed by Aino Aalto and Alvar Aalto. They also include paintings by Alvar Aalto and more than 30 models of his buildings. In addition to unique pieces of furniture, the collections include almost all models that were mass-produced, as well as a great number of prototypes.

The Alvar Aalto collection of drawings contain ca. 200,000 original drawings and documents related to his designs, beginning from 1917. The museum also has in Jyväskylä a photo archive, a newspaper archive, a reference library and the archive of Aalto's correspondence.

== Exhibitions ==
The permanent exhibition Alvar Aalto, Architect presents the output of Aalto through models, original drawings and photographs. Special attention is given to 24 individual buildings or groups of buildings. Also present is Aalto's design of interiors, glass objects and pieces of furniture. In addition to the permanent exhibition, the museum Gallery contains changing exhibitions on architecture and design. The museum also organises touring exhibitions on Aalto's works. It is also possible to acquaint oneself with Aalto's architecture and design in the museums web exhibitions.

=== Web exhibitions ===
- Alvar Aalto’s life 1898–1976
- The Paimio Sanatorium
- Chairs
- Light fittings
- Säynätsalo Town Hall

== The Muuratsalo Experimental House ==
The experimental house of Muuratsalo is located on the shores of Lake Päijänne. It was built as a summer residence for Alvar and Elissa Aalto during 1952–1954, and used as the summer home by the Aalto family until 1994. Since then, the house has been acquired by the museum. The house is enclosed by a provisional courtyard space which, when looking outward, frames the landscape within its entrance. This partial enclosure mediates the space, creating a distinction between interior and exterior, open and closed form. The facade uses a mix of different styles of reclaimed bricks and bricklaying arrangements. Aalto described this group of buildings as a combination of an architect's studio and an experimental centre, in which one could also carry out experiments that are not yet sufficiently well developed to be tried out in practice and where the proximity of nature may offer inspiration for both form and structure. It was a kind of a laboratory, which at the same time was combined with a playful approach.

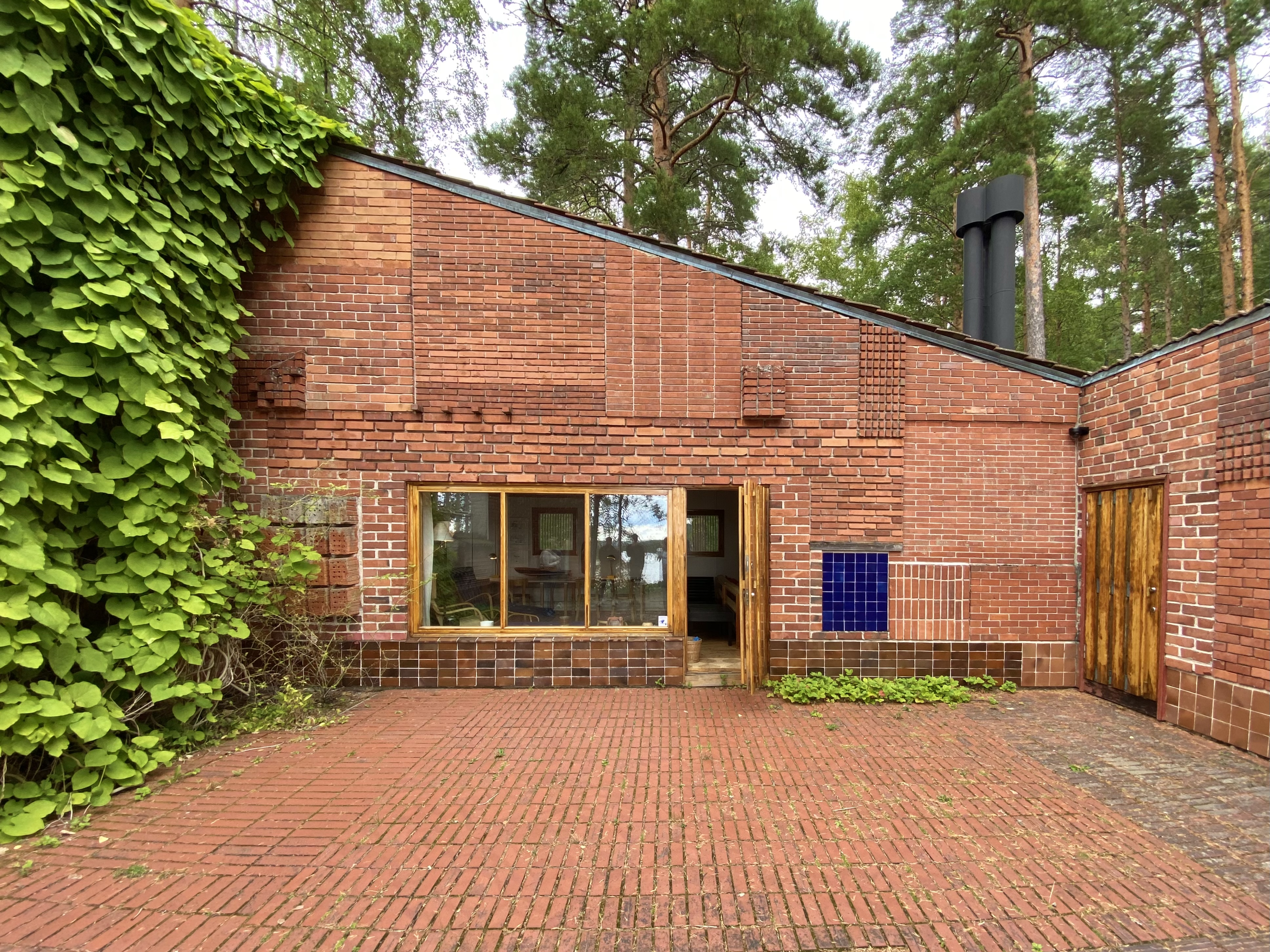
Inner yard

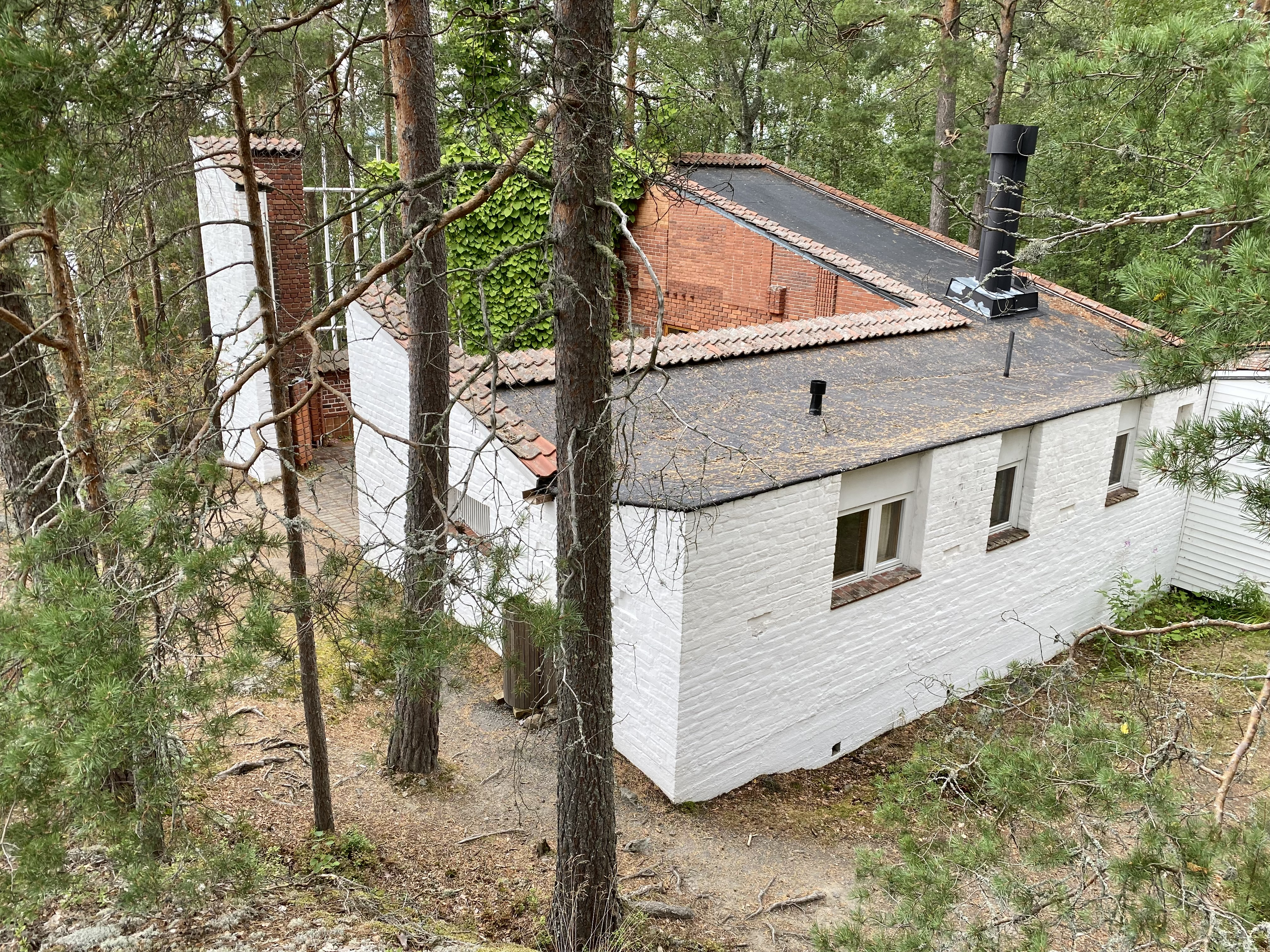
Exterior view

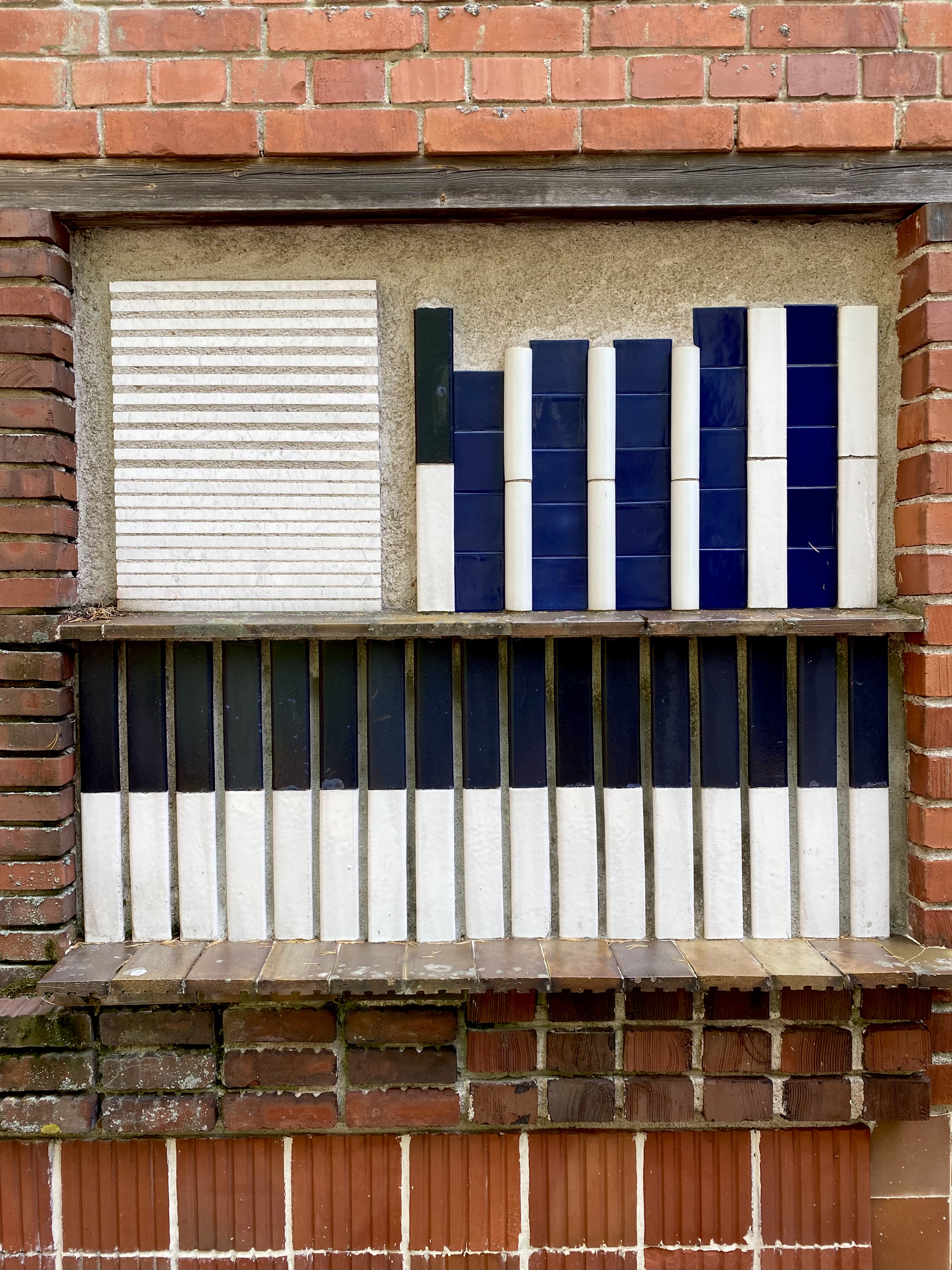
Aalto experimented with materials and their combinations
