= Studio Aalto =

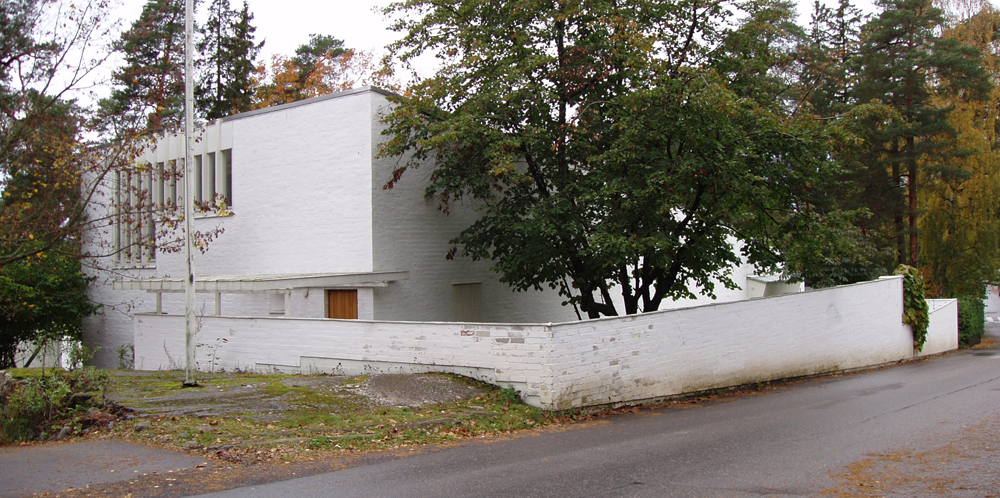
- Alvar Aalto’s studio in Munkkiniemi, Helsinki
- Interactive map of the Studio Aalto area

General information
- Location: Tiilimäki 20, Munkkiniemi, Helsinki
- Coordinates: 60°11′53.7″N 24°52′10.13″E
- Completed: 1955
- Owner: Alvar Aalto Office, Alvar Aalto Foundation (since 1984)

Design and construction
- Architect: Alvar Aalto

UNESCO World Heritage Site
- Official name: Aalto Atelier, Helsinki
- Part of: Aalto Works
- Criteria: Cultural: ii
- Reference: 1752
- Inscription: 2026 (48th Session)

The Studio Aalto is a house in the Tiilimäki neighbourhood of Munkkiniemi, Helsinki, which Alvar Aalto designed during 1955–56 to be the studio of his architect bureau. Due to a large number of commissions, the office needed more space in which to work. The studio is said to be one of his best buildings from the 1950s. Near the studio there is also Villa Aalto, the home (and previous office) of the Aaltos. Both the studio and the Villa are now part of the Alvar Aalto Museum, and they are open to the public. The Alvar Aalto Academy and Alvar Aalto Museum Architectural Heritage Department are housed in Studio Aalto.

In July 2026, the Studio Aalto, along with 12 other Aalto Works, was designated by UNESCO as a World Heritage Site.

== Architecture ==
The building is designed to be used as an architect's office. It is not a conventional office building. Aalto is reported to have said that “architectural art can not be created in an office-like environment.”

The façade is built in plain style, in white-painted, lightly rendered brickwork. The closed-in mass of the building conceals a garden shaped like an amphitheatre in its inner courtyard.

The slender mass of the office wing is in white-painted, lightly rendered brickwork. From the working space upstairs, large windows give a view to both east and west.

An extension was built in 1963, with a kitchen and a dining space. These two were referred to as “the taverna”. In the courtyard there is an amphitheatre-like small space, the steps being built out of natural slate.

Alvar Aalto ran the office until his death in 1976. After that, the office continued under the leadership of Elissa Aalto until 1994. The building came into the custodianship of the Alvar Aalto Foundation in 1984 and today it houses the Alvar Aalto Foundation, the Alvar Aalto Academy and the Alvar Aalto Museum Architectural Heritage.

== Gallery ==
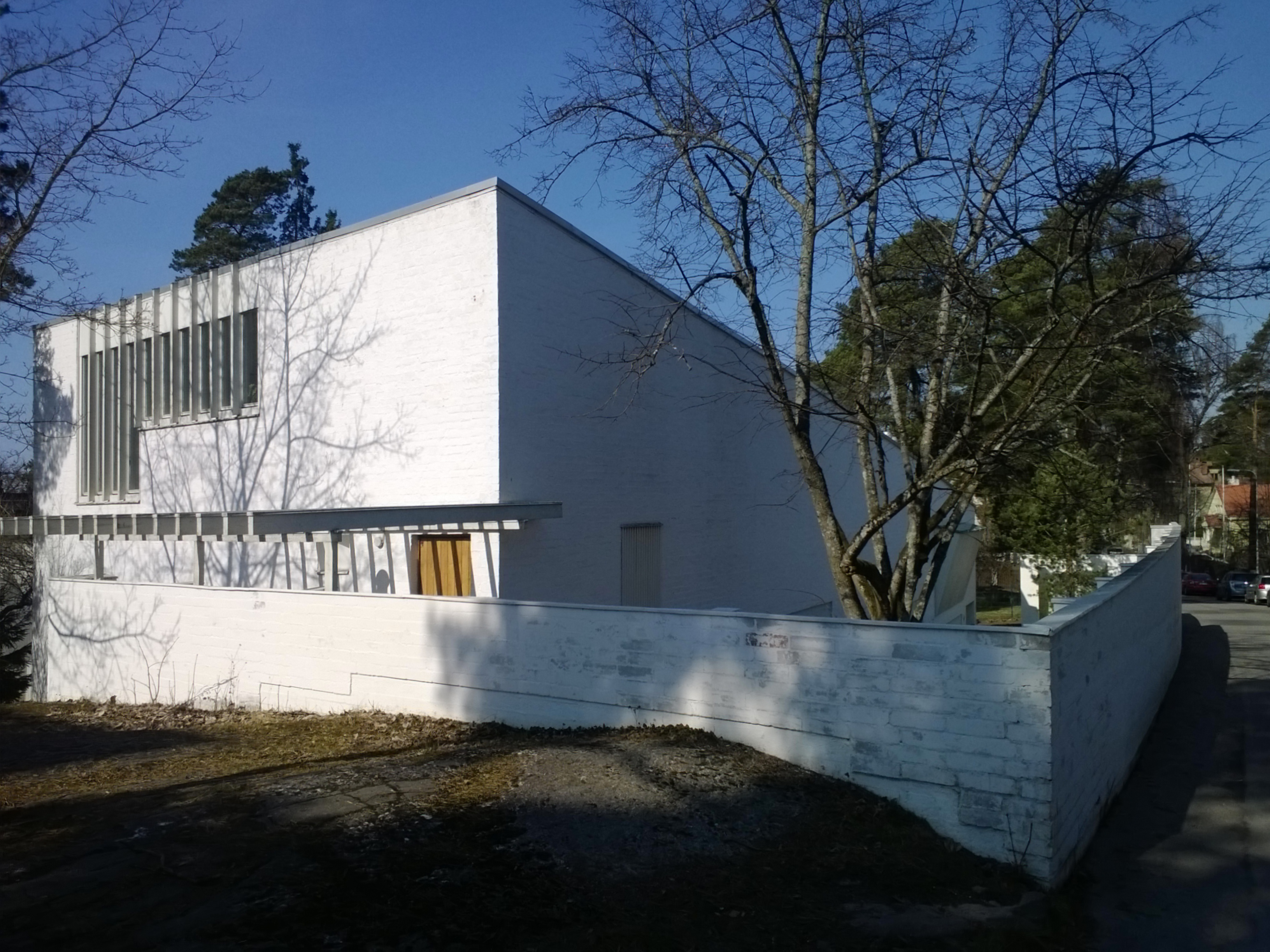
Exterior

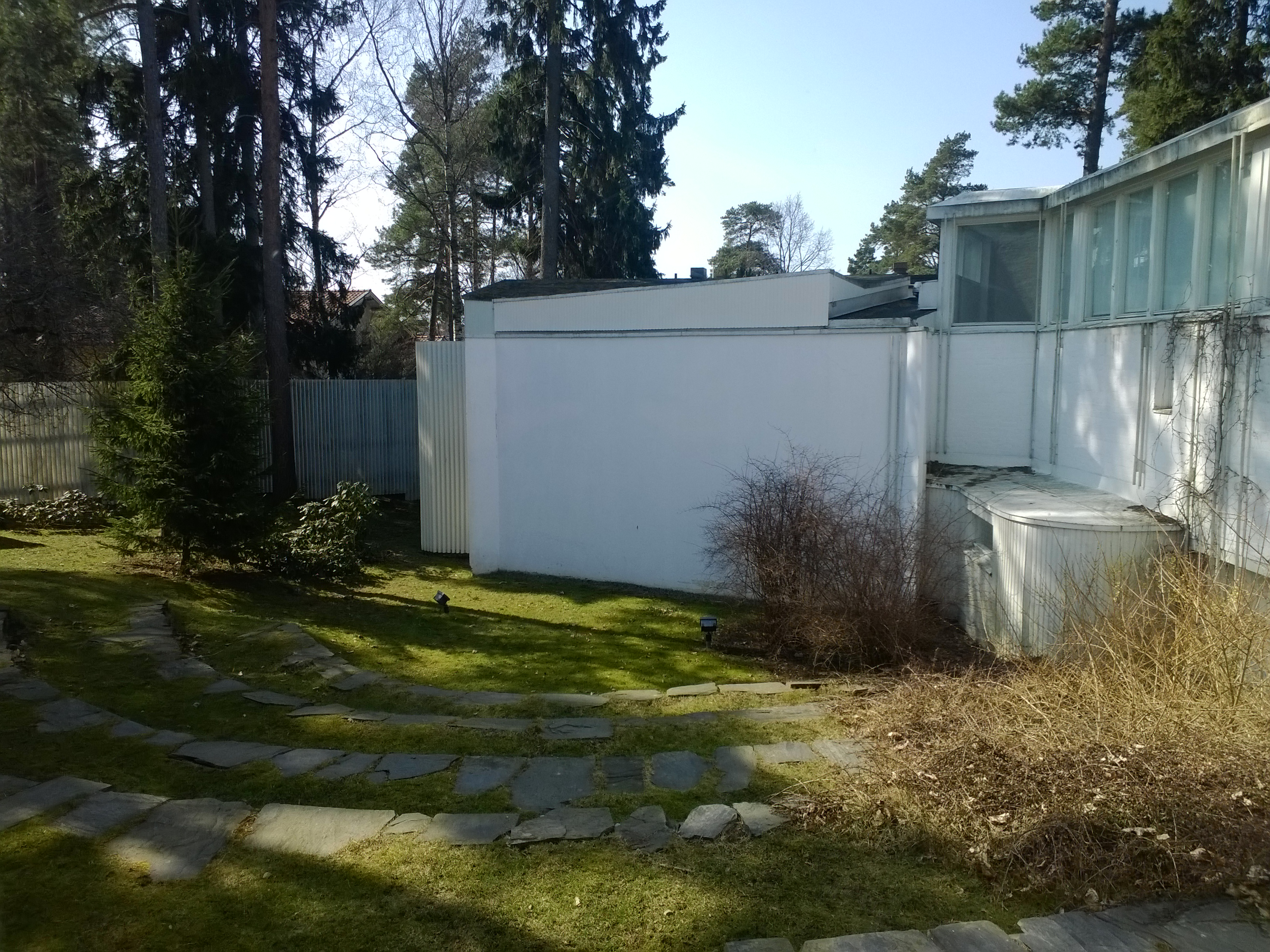
Courtyard

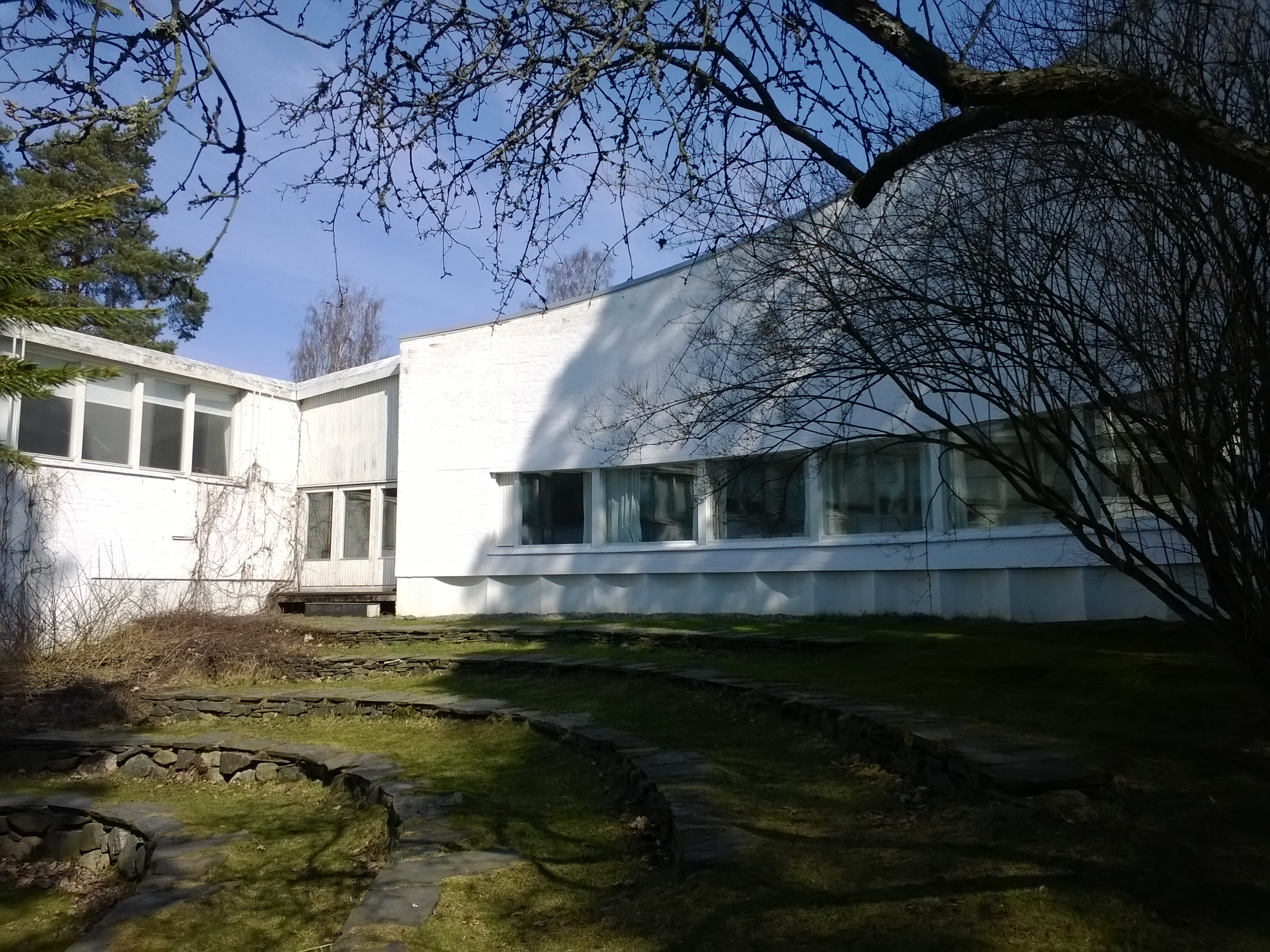
Courtyard

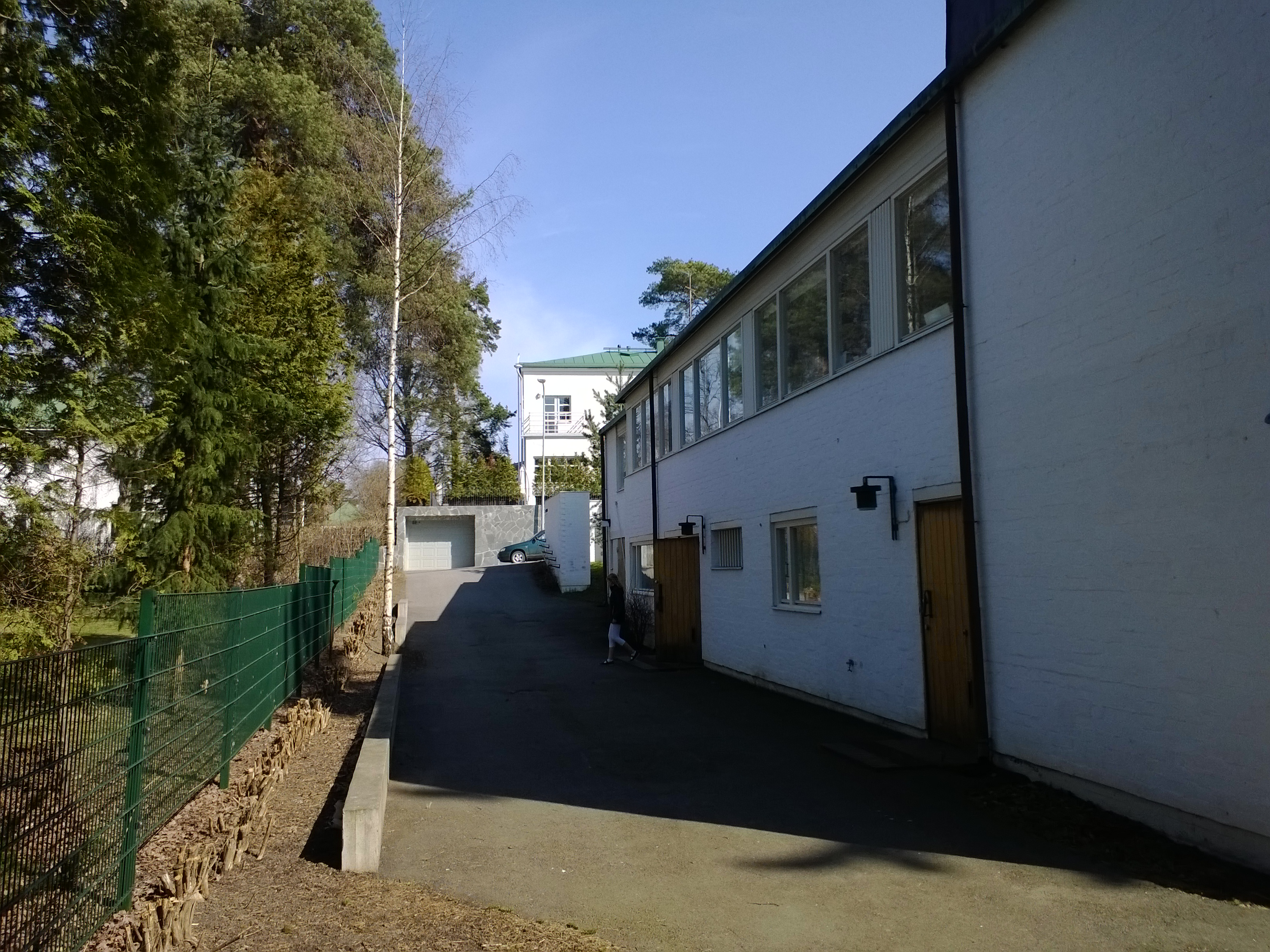
Entrance doors

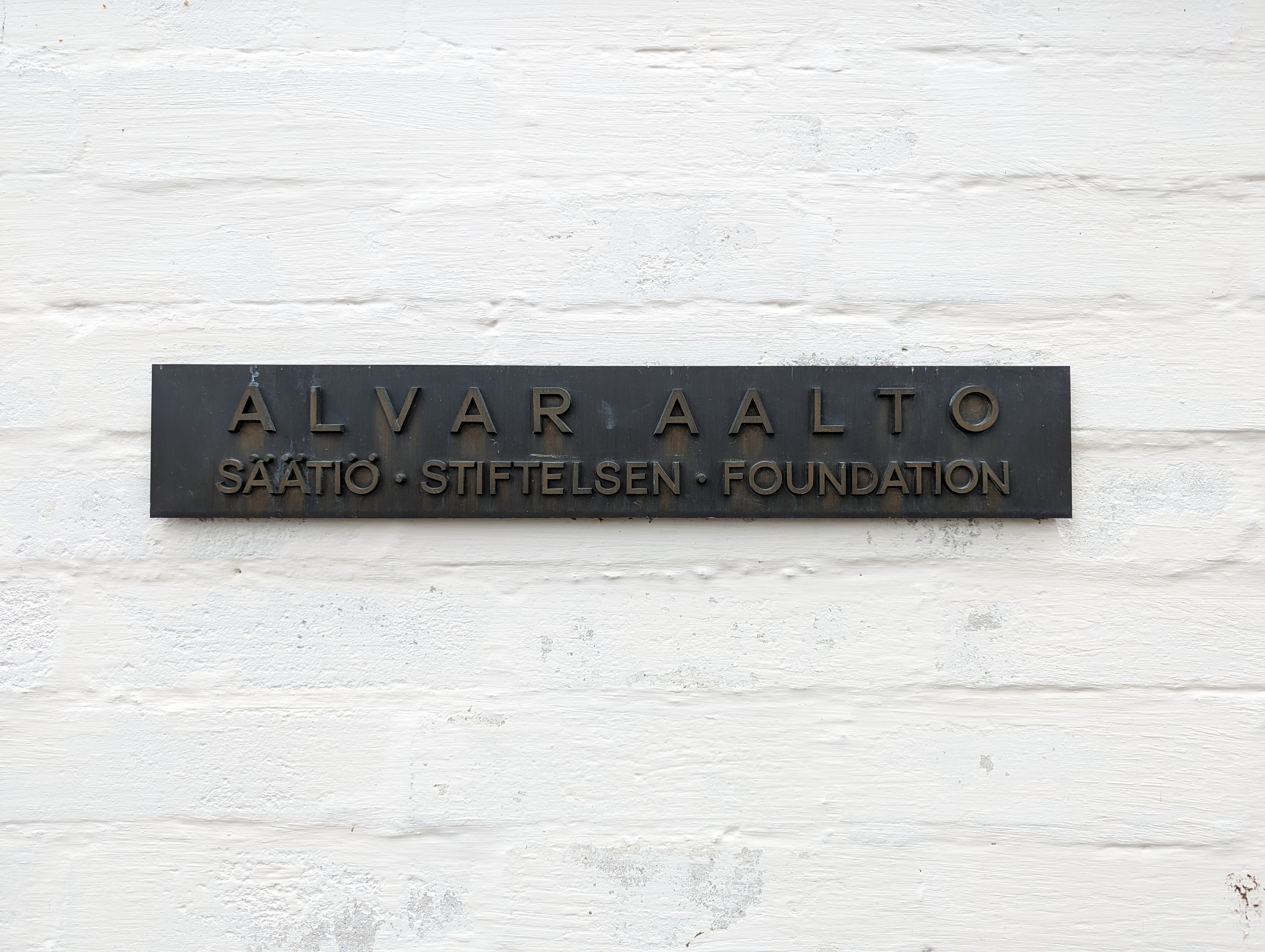
Entry plate

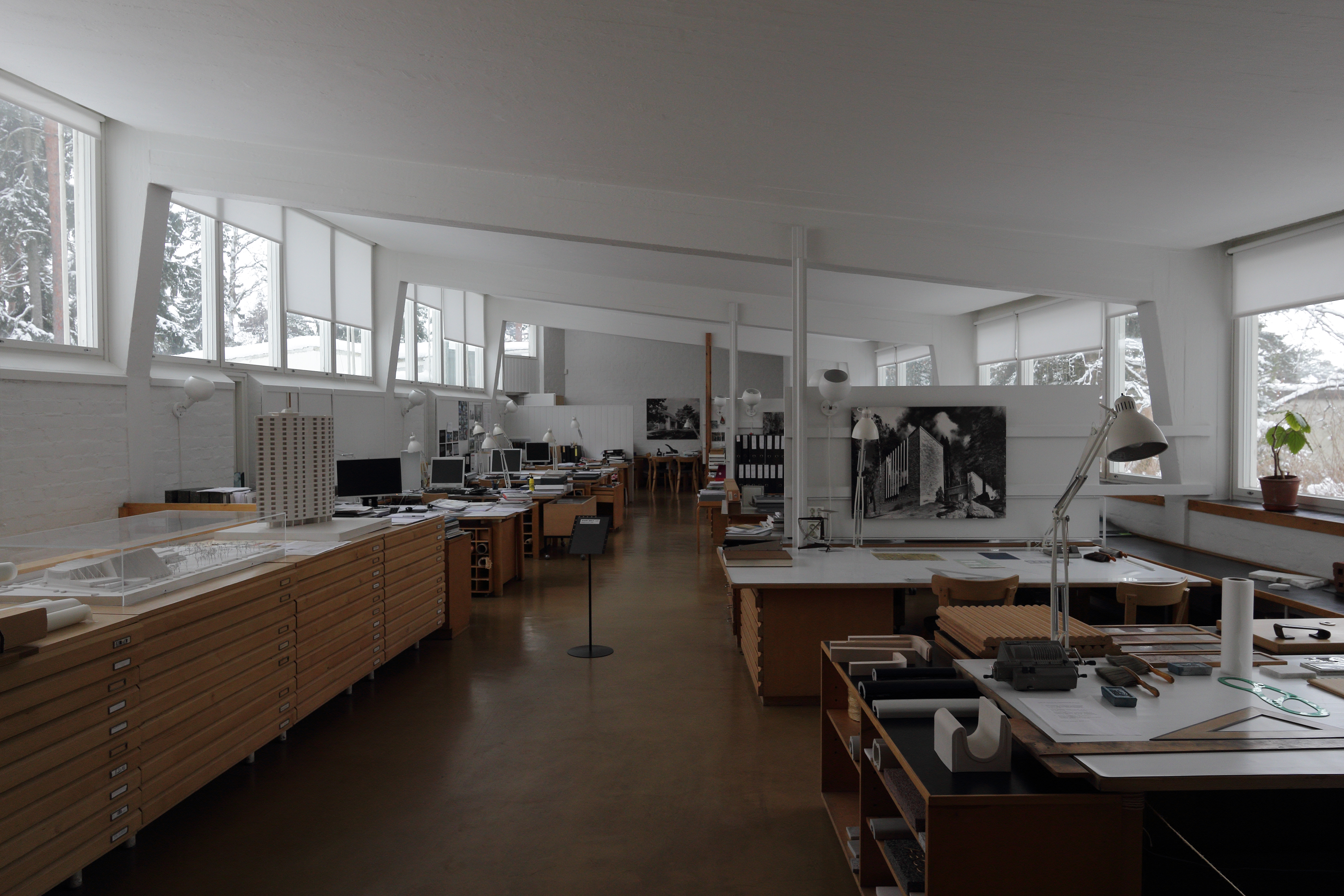
Upstairs working space

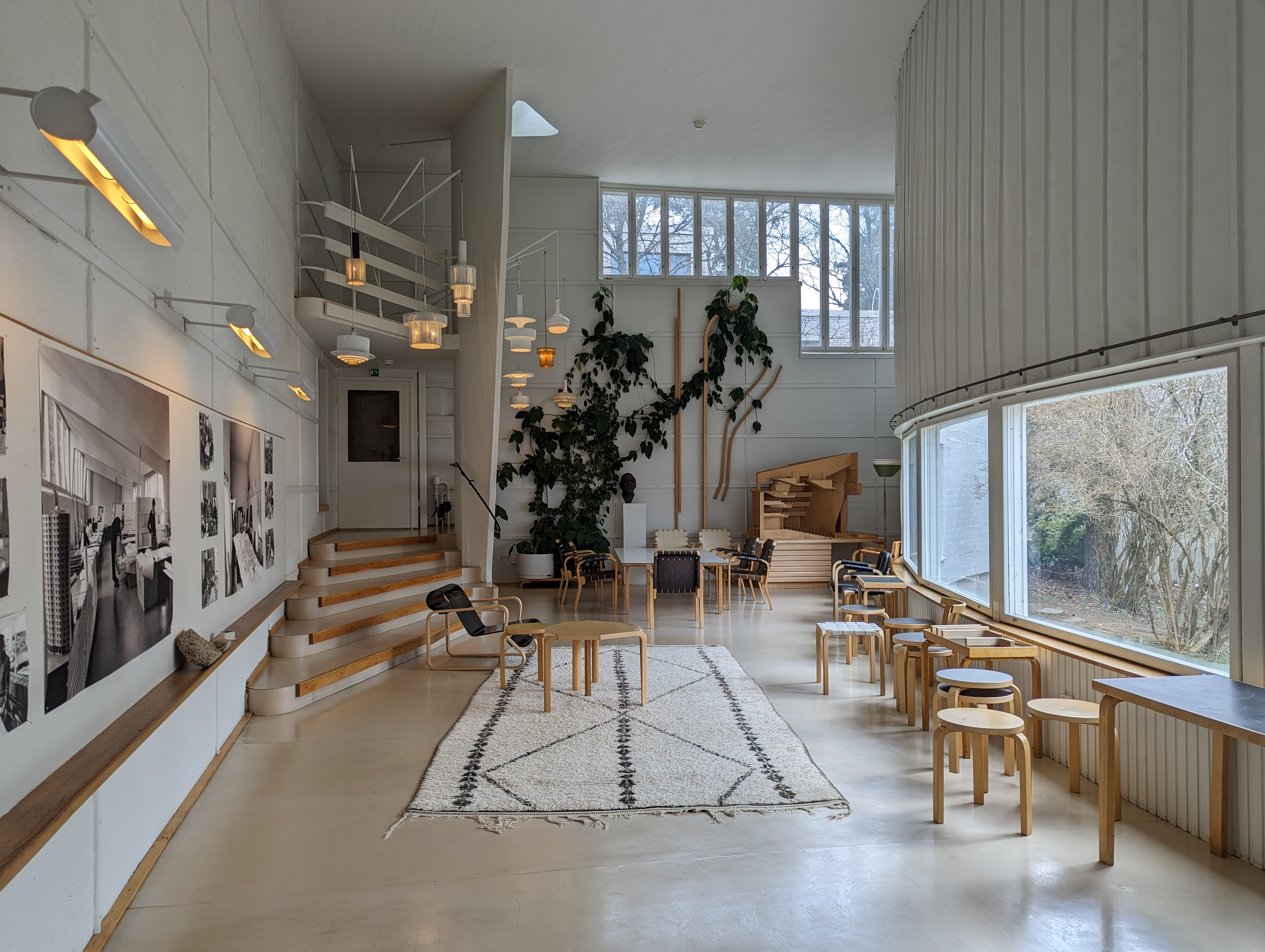
Interior with Alvar Aalto desk

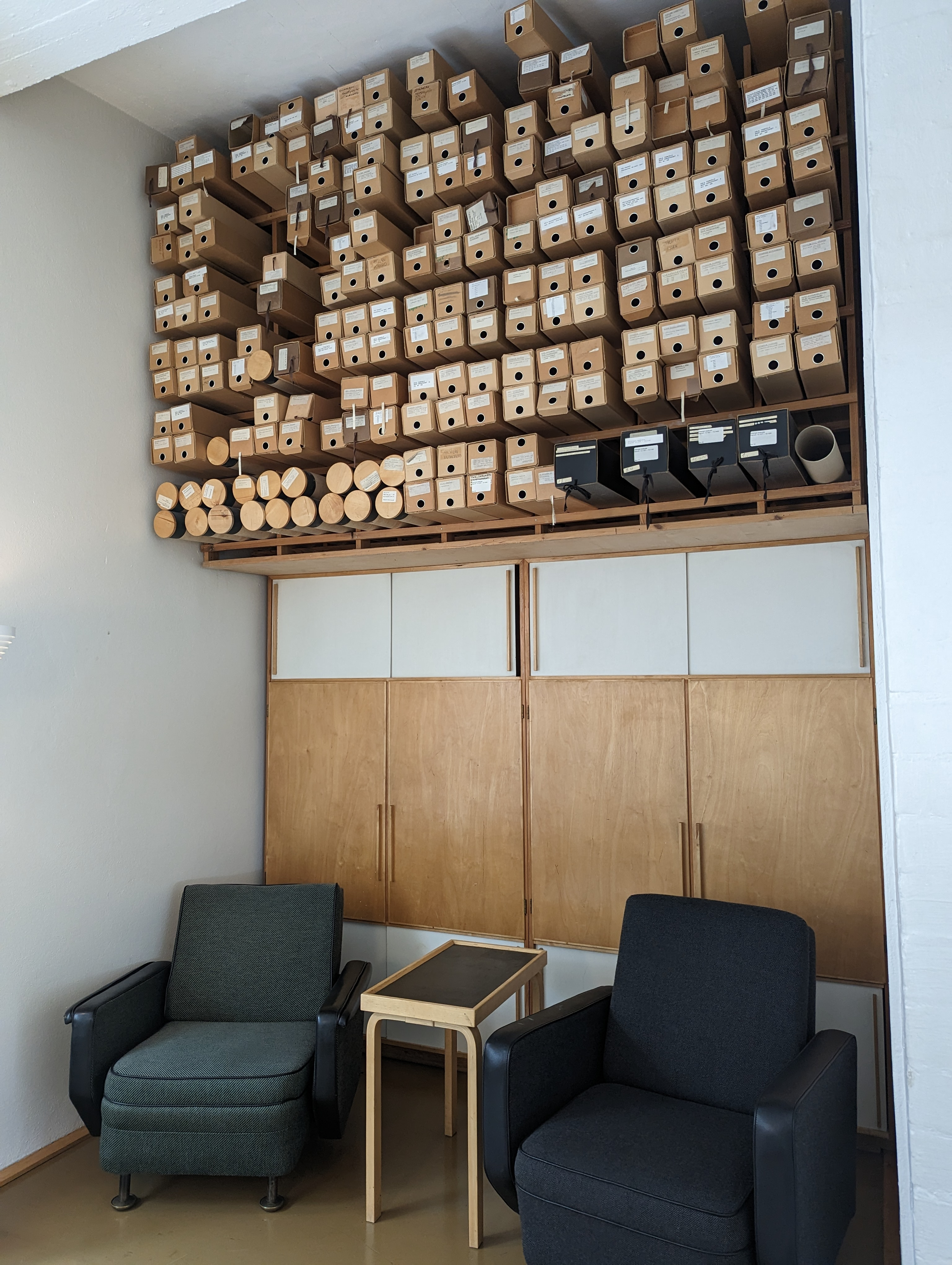
Blueprints

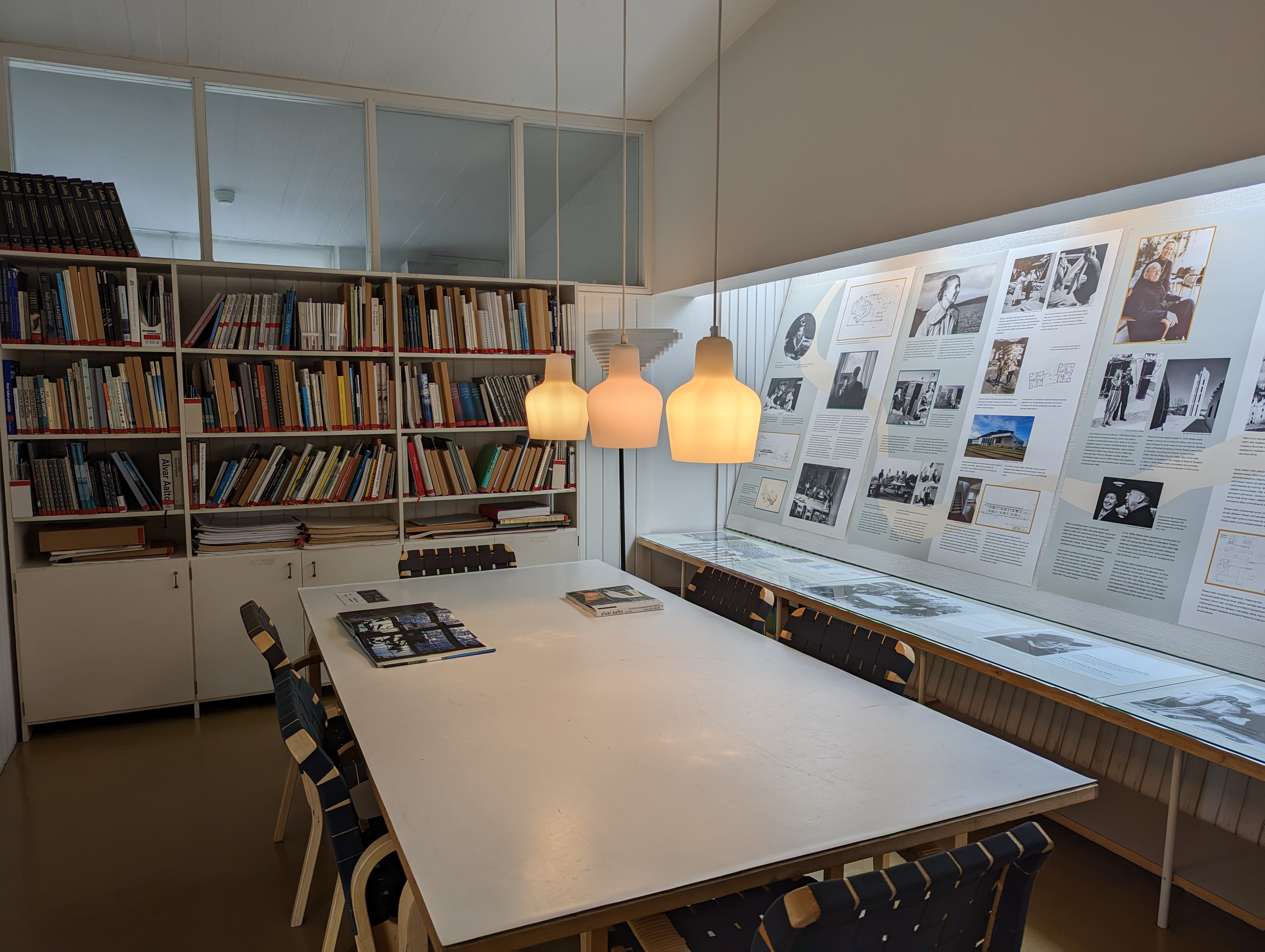
Projects show room

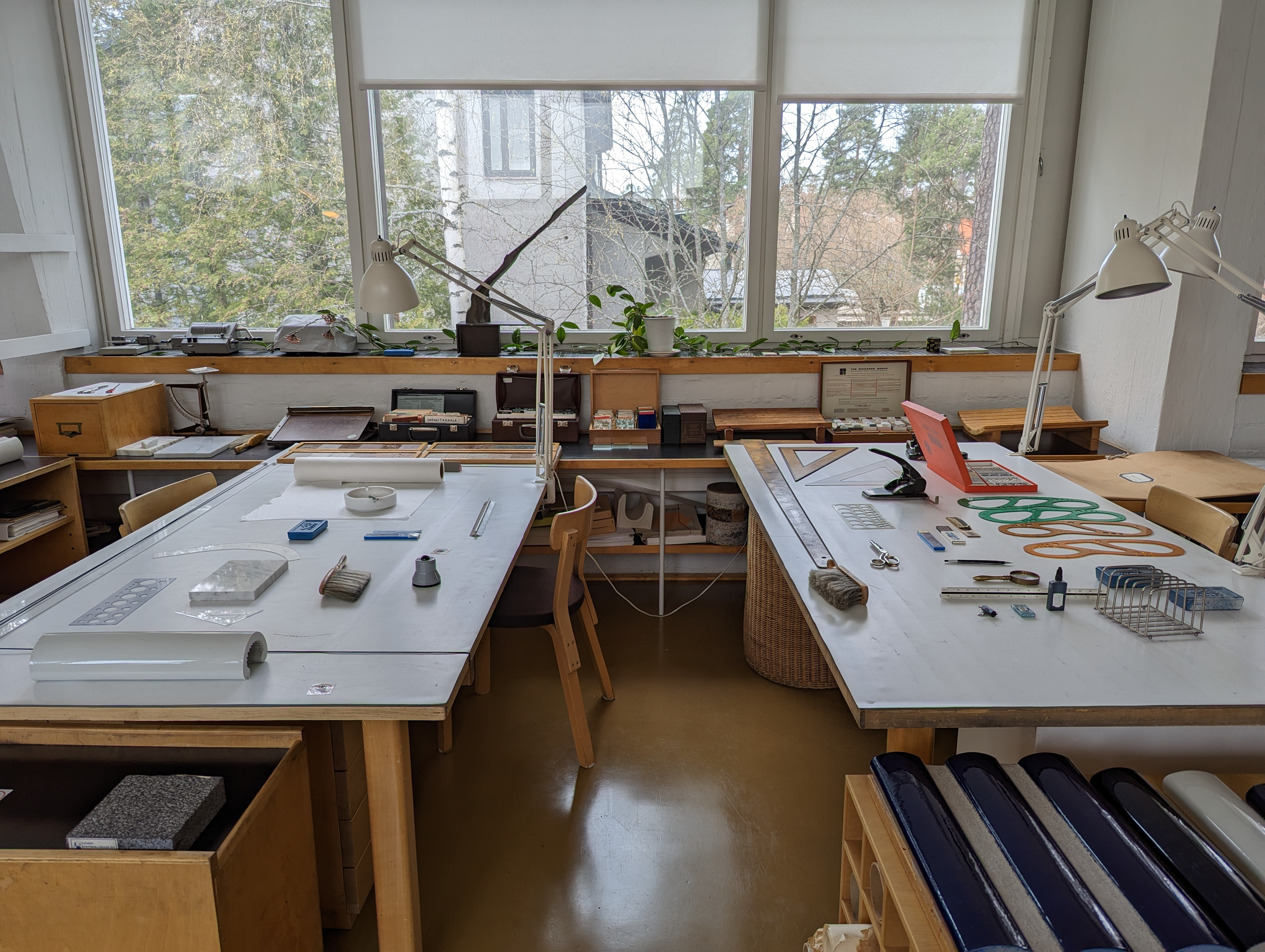
Desks with samples

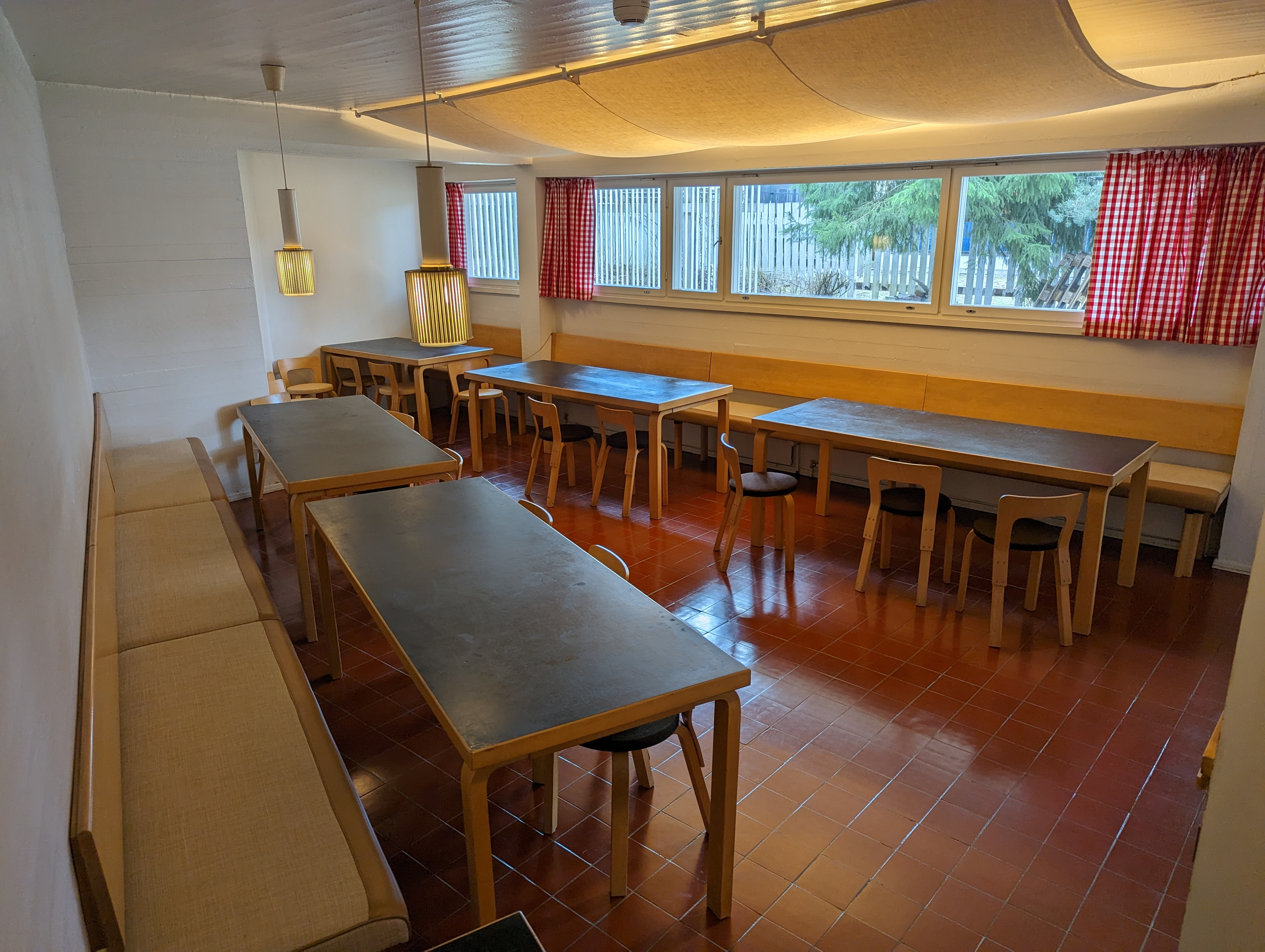
Cafeteria

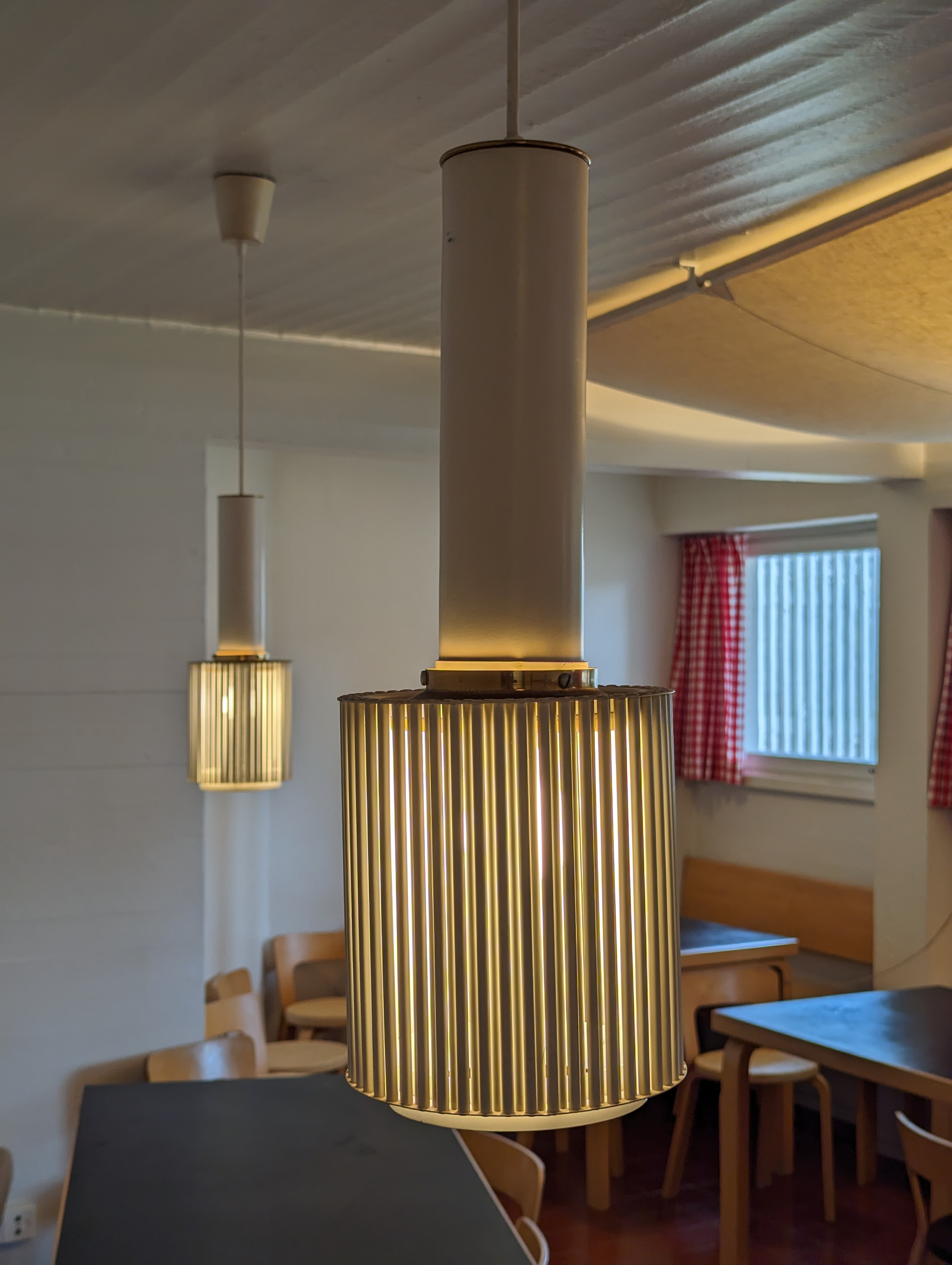
Grenade lamp

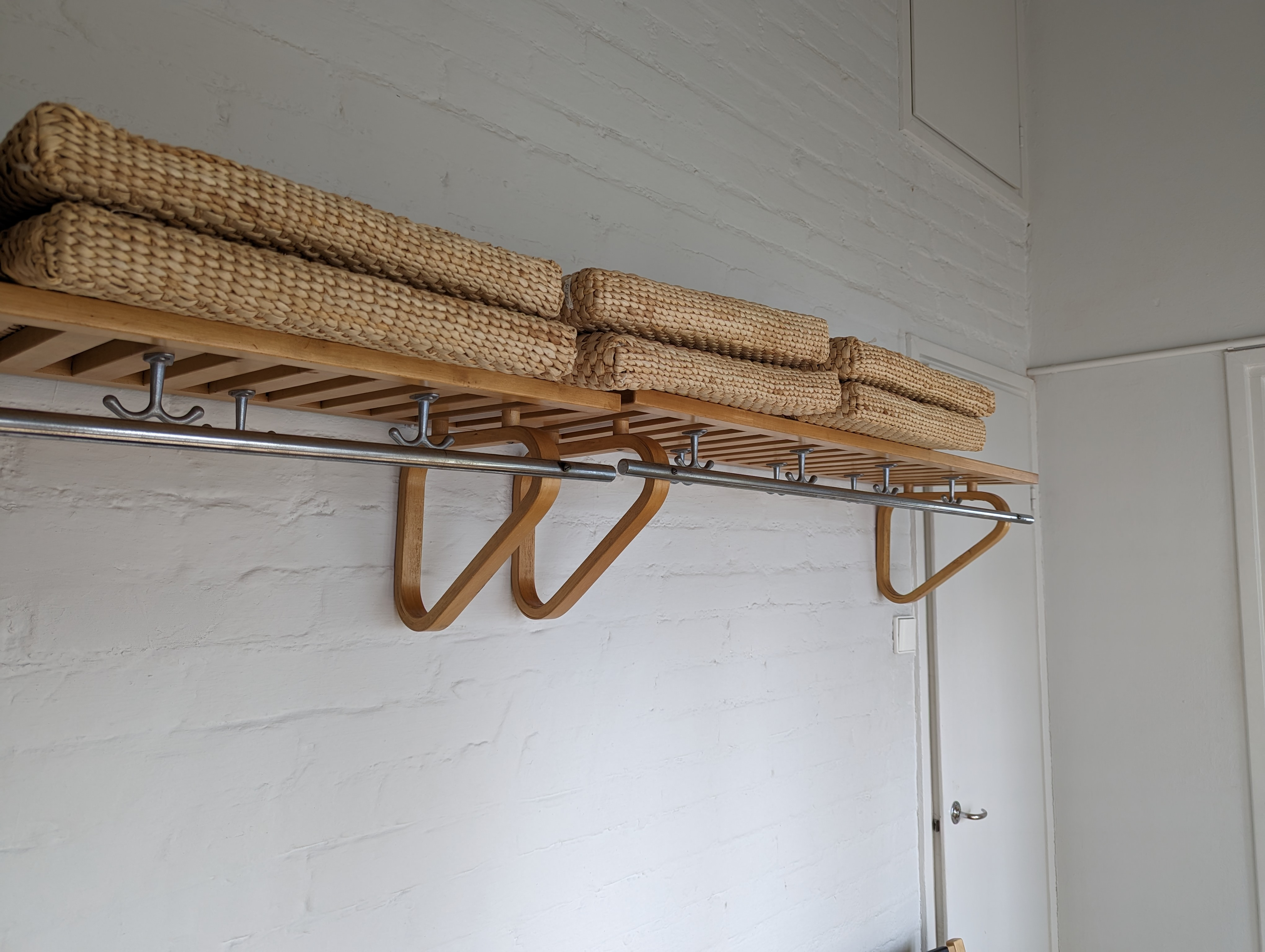
Coat hanger & luggage rack made of plywood
