= Artek (company) =

Finnish furniture company

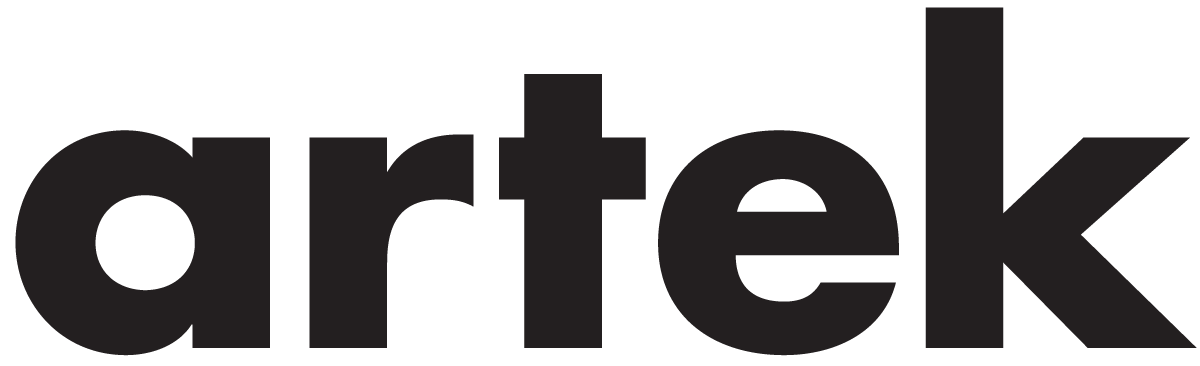
- Company type: Osakeyhtiö
- Industry: Furniture (manufacture and retail)
- Founded: 1935; 91 years ago in Helsinki, Finland
- Founders: Alvar Aalto, Aino Aalto, Maire Gullichsen, Nils-Gustav Hahl
- Headquarters: Kamppi, Finland
- Parent: Vitra
- Website: www.artek.fi/en/

Artek is a Finnish furniture company. It was founded in December 1935 by architect Alvar Aalto and his wife Aino Aalto, visual arts promoter Maire Gullichsen and art historian Nils-Gustav Hahl. The founders chose a non-Finnish name: the neologism Artek was meant to manifest the desire to combine art and technology. This echoed a main idea of the International Style movement, especially the Bauhaus, to emphasize the technical expertise in production and quality of materials, instead of historical-based, eclectic or frivolous ornamentation.

The original aim of the venture was to promote the furniture and glassware of Alvar Aalto and Aino Aalto, and to produce furnishings for their buildings. Before 1935 the Aaltos' designs were manufactured by Huonekalu-ja Rakennustyötehdas Oy in Turku. That company was renamed Huonekalutehdas Korhonen Oy and moved to Littoinen, but now both companies are owned by Vitra (furniture). Artek have their own in-house designers, such as Ben af Schulten. Originally, the studio was set up ostensibly to assist Aalto's architects' office with interior designs for his buildings. Since Aalto's passing in 1976 the company has sold design objects by other Finnish designers, such as Juha Leiviskä, Ilmari Tapiovaara, and Eero Aarnio. Other non-Finnish designers affiliated with Vitra, like the Bouroullec brothers, work with Artek as well if their designs are found to fit within the Artek portfolio. Artek currently operates three stores: a main store and a 2nd Cycle showroom in Helsinki, and a store in Tokyo.

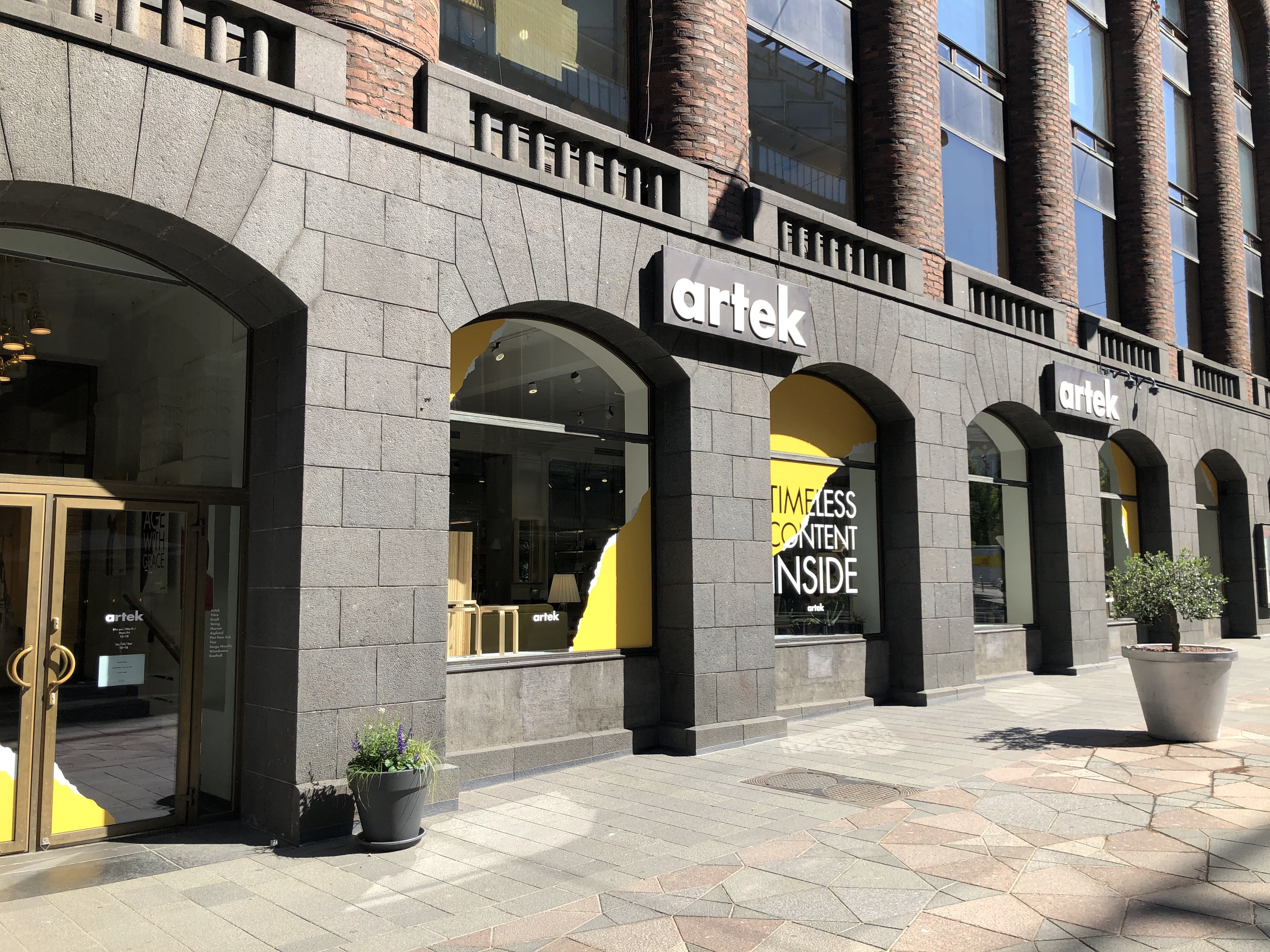
Artek's main store in Helsinki

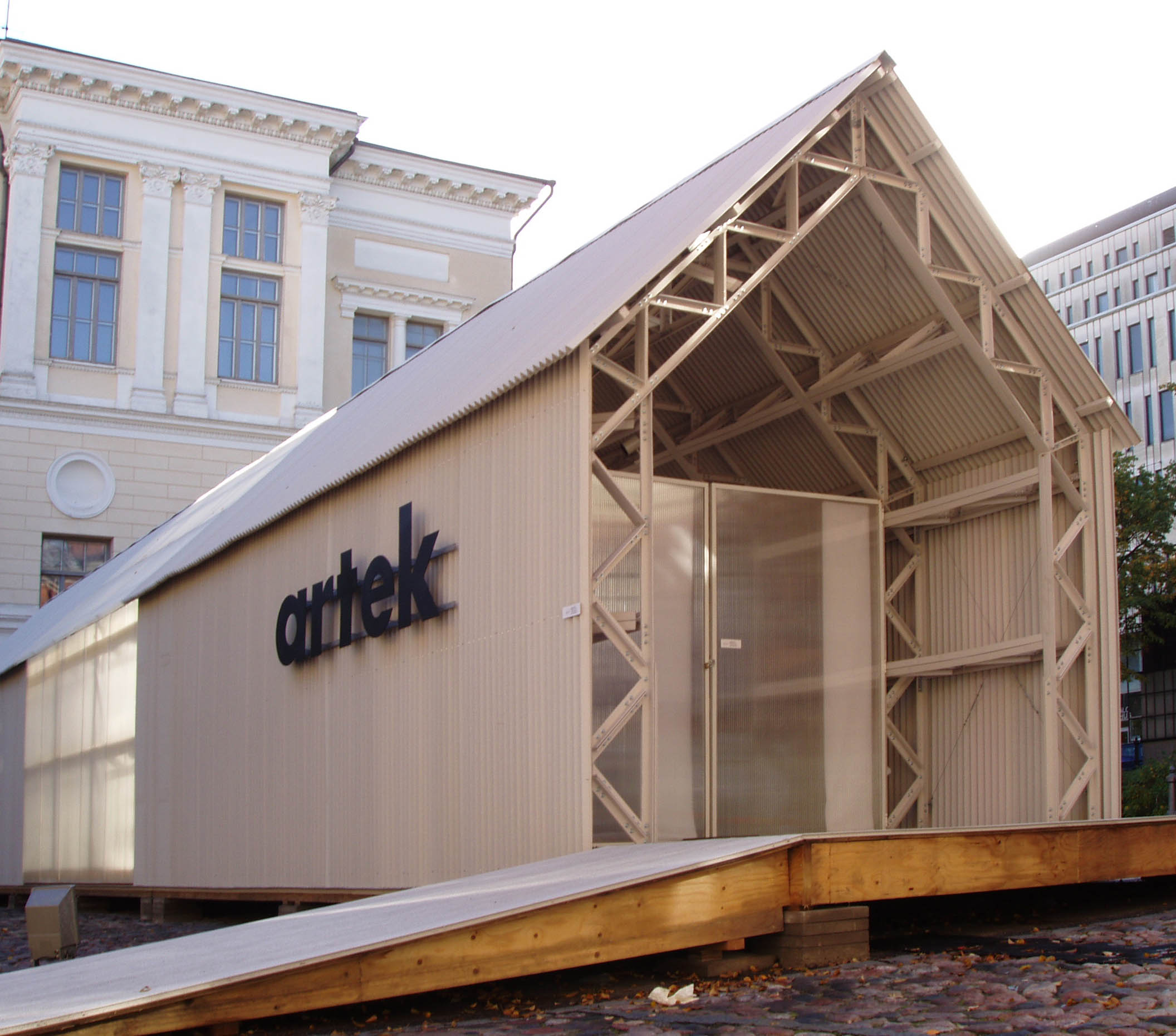
Shigeru Ban, Artek Pavilion, 2007

== Representative Furniture ==
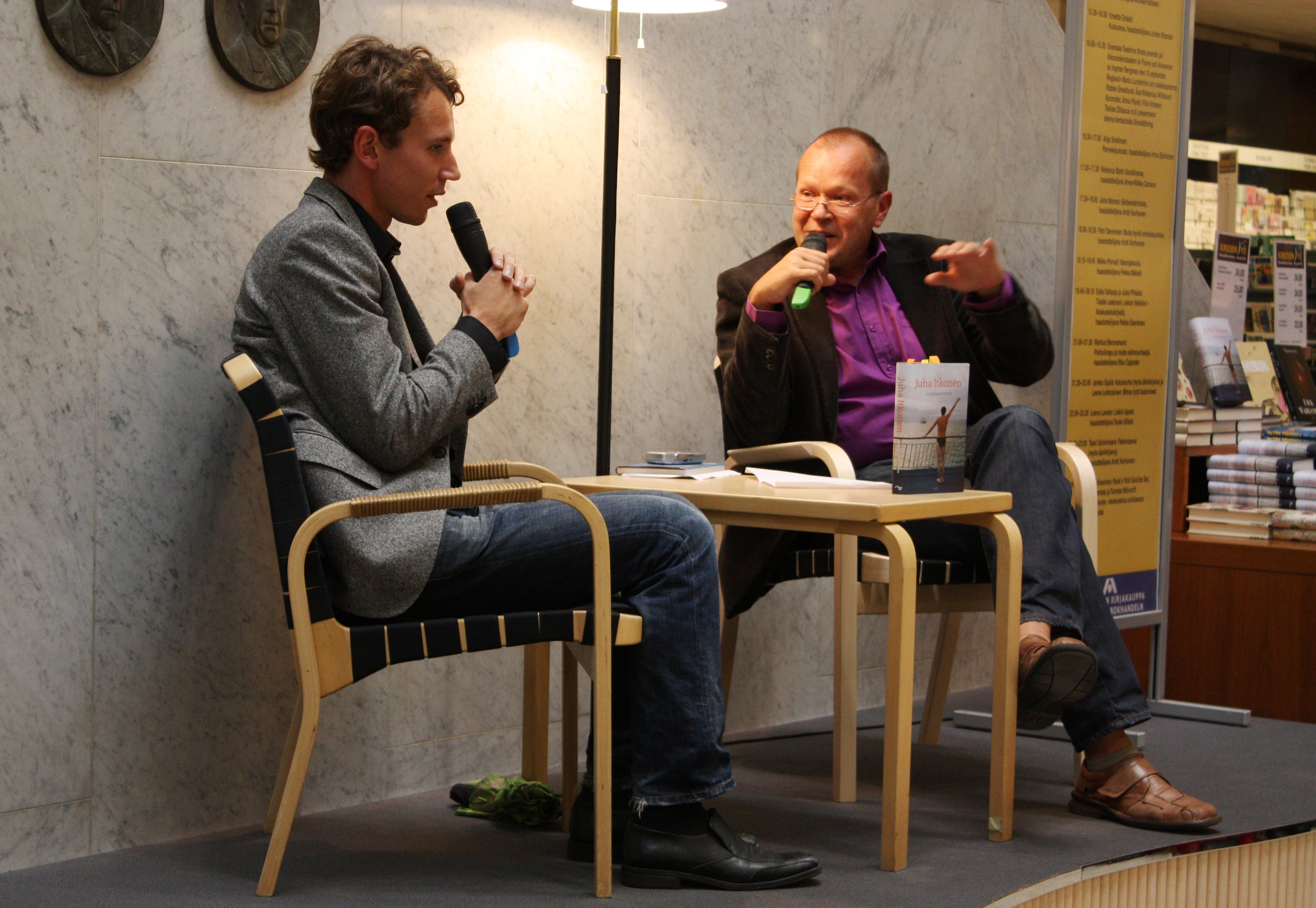
Chairs and table by Artek at the Aalto-designed Academic Bookstore

=== Paimio Chair ===
From the very beginning of his career Alvar Aalto experimented with materials, especially wood, and even applied for patents for the bending of wood as applied in his furniture designs and as acoustic screens in his buildings. The Aaltos designed several different types of furniture and lamps for the Paimio Sanatorium (1929–33). The best known of the furniture pieces is his cantilevered birch wood Paimio Chair, which was specifically designed for tuberculosis patients to sit in for long hours each day. Aalto argued that the angle of the back of the chair was the perfect angle for the patient to breathe most easily. The design of the chair may have been influenced by Marcel Breuer's metal Wassily Chair, though Aalto was generally negative towards metal furniture. The degree of bending of the wood tested the technical limits of that time. The chair is part of the permanent collections at the MoMA in New York City and the Finnish Design Museum.

=== 3 Leg Stool 60 ===
The Model No. 60 stool, designed circa 1932–1933, demonstrated Alvar Aalto's interest in basic functional, utilitarian forms. It was constructed of bent laminated birch, and originally came in all natural (plain) or curled birch, or with a black, red, or blue seat with natural (plain) legs. It remains one of Artek's most popular items.

=== 3 Leg Stool X600 ===
The X600 evolved from the 60. The handmade legs have the portions attached to the seat opening up into a fan, showing simultaneously the bent wood characteristic of Artek furniture and the fan motif that runs through Aalto's architecture. The X600 is no longer in production.

=== Pirkka Stool ===
The Pirkka Stool was designed in 1955 by Finnish designer Ilmari Tapiovaara. It was originally meant for users to rest on after using a Sauna; its pine and birch construction make the stool resistant to moisture, while the split seat design is meant to allow for ventilation. Notably the pine seat has a concave bend for ergonomics, but it is bent via a method distinct from Alvar Aalto's designs. It remains in production.

== Artek Pavilion ==
In 2007, Japanese architect Shigeru Ban designed an exhibition pavilion for Artek, built from reconstituted waste material provided by the Finnish paper manufacturer UPM. The pavilion was first used at the Milan Triennale in 2007, after which it was temporally in use outside the Design Museum, Helsinki.

== Artek 2nd Cycle ==
Artek operates a third store, located in Helsinki, for its 2nd Cycle program which began in 2006. The program collects used Artek and Huonekalutehdas Korhonen Oy furniture and resells them. Often made available are rare and discontinued items; repairs and refurbishing work are done as necessary but minor wear or cosmetic blemishes are part of the appeal of the 2nd Cycle products.

== Exhibition ==
From 22 April– 2 October 2016, the Bard Graduate Center exhibited Artek and the Aaltos: Creating a Modern World. The exhibit “was the first exhibition in the United States to examine Artek, a pioneering Finnish design company founded in 1935, and the first to have a specific focus on the two architect co-founders, Alvar Aalto (1898–1976) and Aino Marsio-Aalto (1894–1949).” The exhibit was accompanied by catalog edited by Nina Stritzler-Levine and Timo Riekko (978-0300258967).
