= Paimio Sanatorium =

Former tuberculosis sanatorium in Paimio, Finland

Coordinates: 60°27′54″N 22°44′05″E

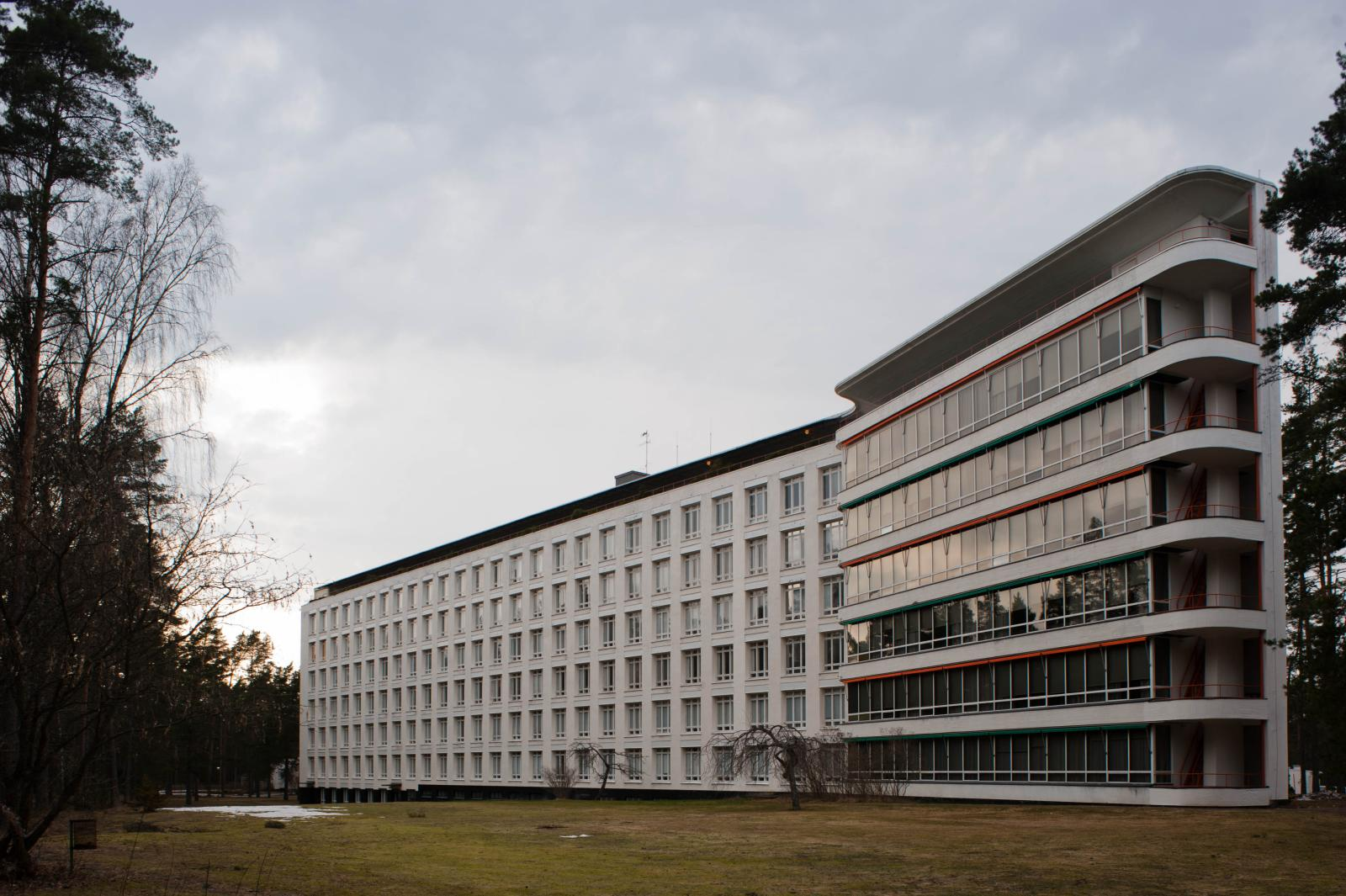

UNESCO World Heritage Site
- Official name: Paimio Sanatorium, Paimio
- Part of: Aalto Works
- Criteria: Cultural: ii
- Reference: 1752
- Inscription: 2026 (48th Session)

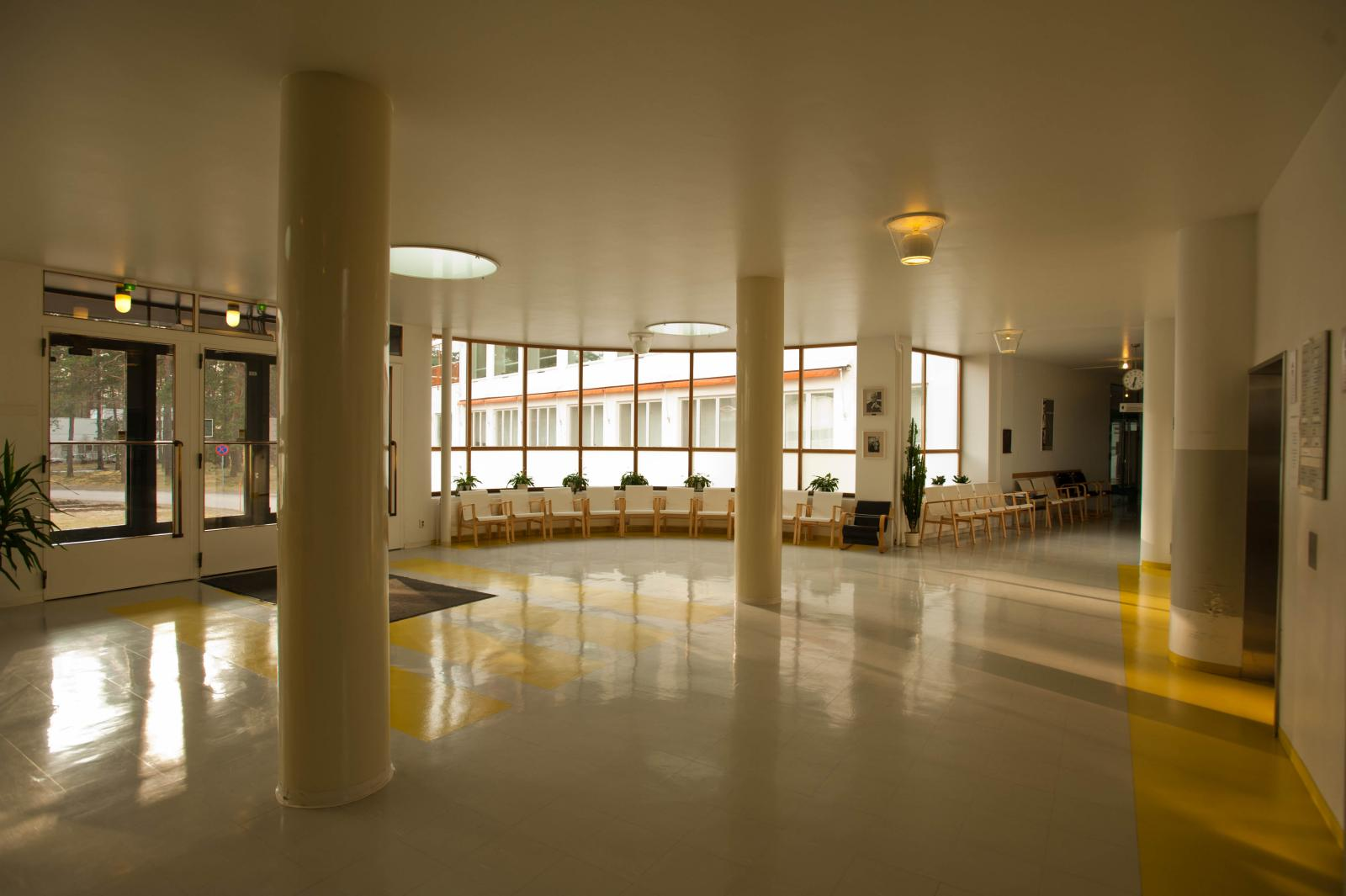
Interior of the sanatorium

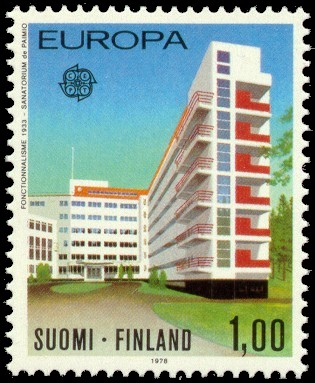
Postage stamp depicting the Paimio hospital building

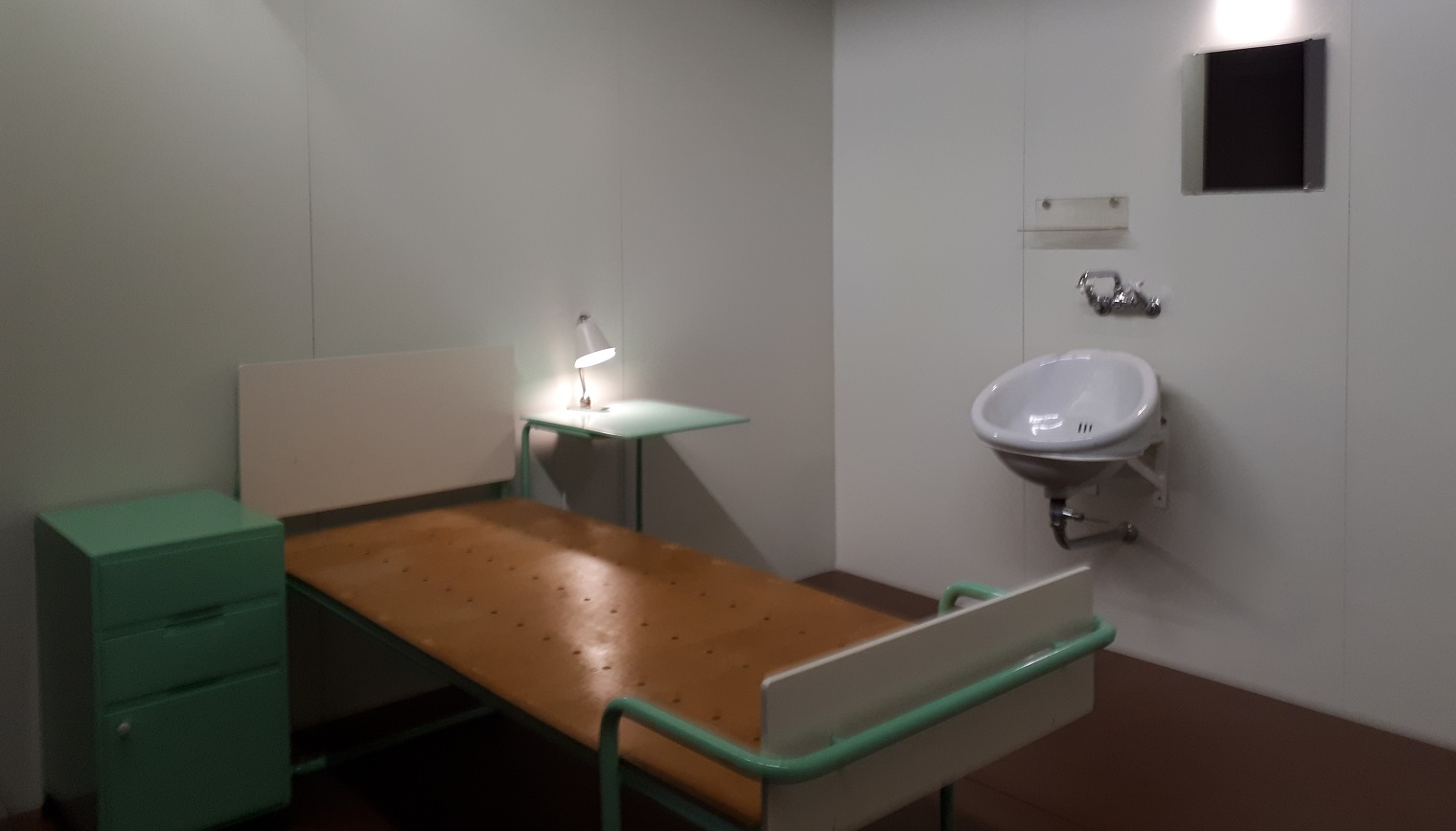
Exhibition reconstruction of a sanatorium patient's room

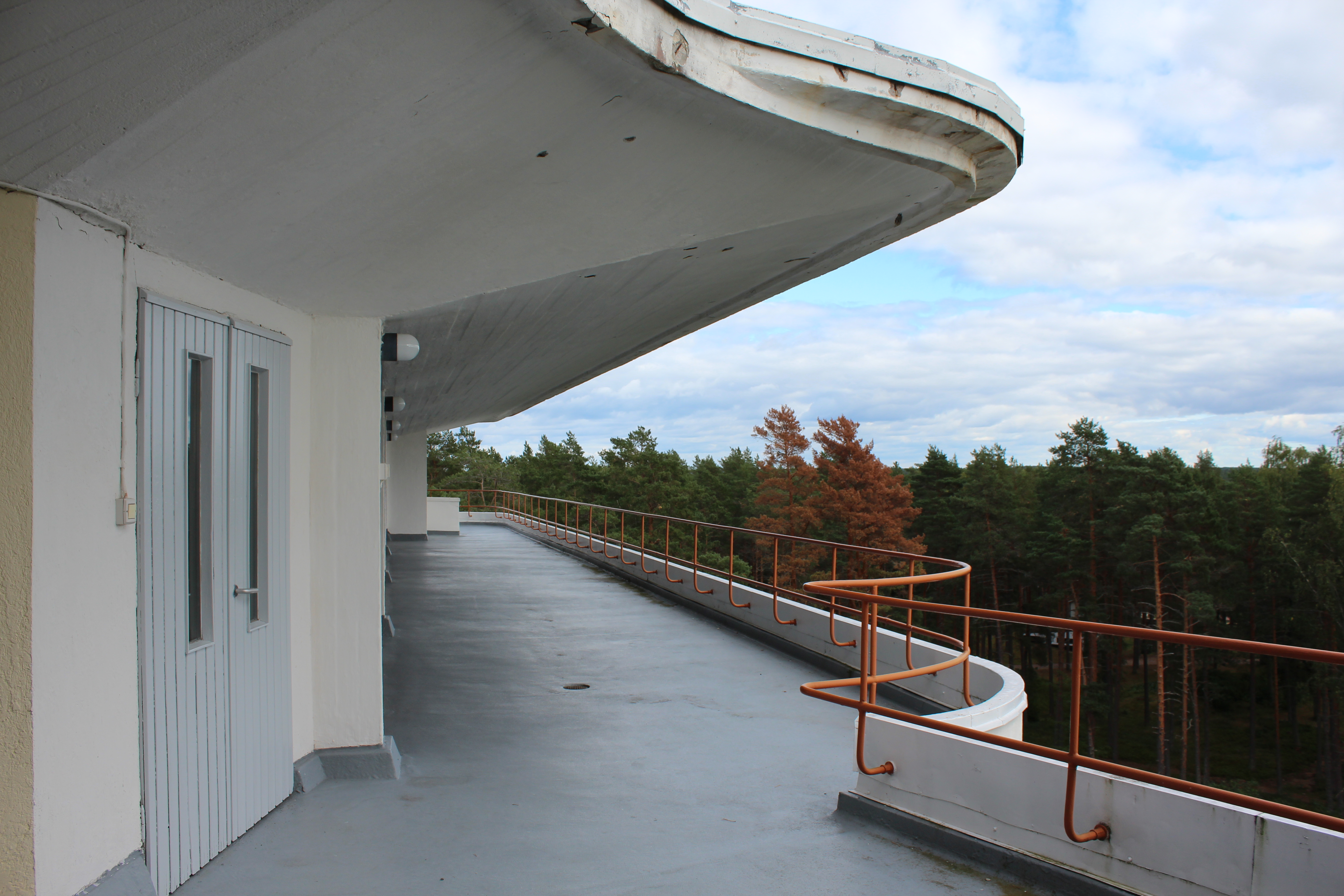
Sun deck at the top floor of the building.

Paimio Sanatorium (Finnish: Paimion parantola; Swedish: Pemars sanatorium) is a former tuberculosis sanatorium in Paimio, Southwest Finland, designed by Finnish architect Alvar Aalto. Aalto received the design commission having won the architectural competition for the project held in 1929. The building was completed in 1933, and soon after received critical acclaim both in Finland and abroad. The building served exclusively as a tuberculosis sanatorium until the early 1960s, when it was converted into a general hospital. Today the building is owned by Turku University Hospital but is not functioning as a hospital; rather, the building has functioned as private rehabilitation centre for children since 2014. In July 2026, the sanatorium, along with other Aalto Works, was designated by UNESCO as a World Heritage Site.

== History ==
Aalto received the commission to design the building after winning an architectural competition for the project held in 1929. Though the building represents the 'modernist' period of Aalto's career, and followed many of the tenets of Le Corbusier's pioneering ideas for modernist architecture (e.g. ribbon windows, roof terraces, machine aesthetic), it also carried the seeds of Aalto's later move towards a more synthetic approach. For instance, the main entrance is marked by a nebulous-shaped canopy unlike anything being designed at that time by the older generation of modernist architects. The building is widely regarded as one of his most important early designs — designed at the same time as the Vyborg Library. Aalto and his wife Aino designed all of the sanatorium's furniture and interiors. Some of the furniture, most notably the Paimio chair, is still in production by Artek.

In the 1960s, the threat from tuberculosis declined and Paimio Sanatorium was converted into a general hospital.

== Architecture ==
Aalto's starting point for the design of the sanatorium was to make the building itself a contributor to the healing process. He liked to call the building a "medical instrument". For instance, particular attention was paid to the design of the patient bedrooms: these generally held two patients, each with his or her own cupboard and washbasin. Aalto designed special silent basins, so that the patient would not disturb the other while washing. Aalto placed the lamps in the room out of the patients' line of vision and painted the ceiling a relaxing greyish green so as to avoid glare. Each patient had their own specially designed cupboard, fixed to the wall and off the floor so as to aid in cleaning beneath it.

In the early years the only known "cure" for tuberculosis was complete rest in an environment with clean air and sunshine. Thus on each floor of the building, at the end of the patient bedroom wing, were sunning balconies, where weak patients could be pulled out in their beds. Healthier patients could go and lie on the sun deck on the very top floor of the building. As the patients spent a long time — typically several years — in the sanatorium, there was a distinct community atmosphere among both staff and patients; something which Aalto had taken into account in his designs, with various communal facilities, a chapel, as well as staff housing, and even specially laid out promenade routes through the surrounding forest landscape. In the 1950s the disease could be partly dealt with by surgery and thus a surgery wing, also designed by Aalto's architect studio, was added. Soon after, antibiotics saw the virtual end of the disease, and the number of patients was reduced dramatically and the building was converted into a general hospital.

== Use of Sanatorium today ==
Paimio Sanatorium is still owned by Turku University hospital, but is no longer used as a hospital. Since 2014, the main building and some staff houses have been part of The Foundation for the Rehabilitation of Children and Young People which was established in 2000 by the Mannerheim League for Child Welfare.

== Literature ==
- Margaretha Ehrström, Sirkkaliisa Jetsonen and Tommi Lindh, Nomination of Paimio Hospital for Inclusion in the World Heritage List. Museovirasto, Helsinki, 2005.
- Marianna Heikinheimo (2013): Functionalism and Technology, p. 73-79
- Göran Schildt, Alvar Aalto. The Early Years. Rizzoli, New York, 1984.

== See also ==
- International Style (architecture)
