= Elissa Aalto =

Finnish architect

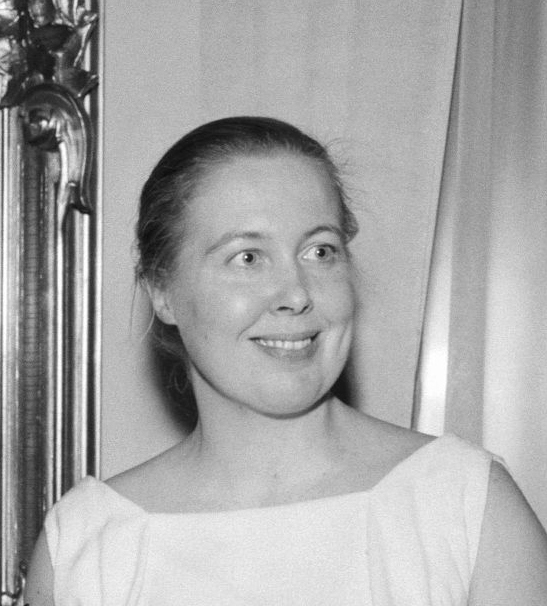
- Aalto in 1959
- Born: Elsa Kaisa Mäkiniemi; 22 November 1922; Kemi, Finland
- Died: 12 April 1994 (aged 71); Helsinki, Finland
- Education: Helsinki University of Technology
- Occupation: Architect
- Spouse: Alvar Aalto (m. 1952; died 1976)
- Projects: Aalto Theatre; Rovaniemi city hall

Elissa Aalto (born Elsa Kaisa Mäkiniemi; 22 November 1922 – 12 April 1994) was a Finnish architect.

== Life ==
Elsa Kaisa Mäkiniemi was born in 1922 to the family of jäger-colonel August Mäkiniemi and Aino Mäkiniemi (née Kemppainen).

She graduated in architecture from the Helsinki University of Technology in 1949, and the same year she joined the office of Alvar Aalto. They married in 1952, when she was 29 and he was 54, and they had no children together. At that time, the office was working on several architecture competitions and on some extensive public commissions in Finland and abroad.

After marrying Alvar Aalto in 1952, Elsa Mäkiniemi began using the name Elissa Aalto. She was supervising architect on several of the office’s major building projects, the earliest being the construction site for Säynätsalo Town Hall (1949–52). This was followed, for instance, by Jyväskylä Institute of Pedagogics (now the University of Jyväskylä, 1951–71), the private house Maison Louis Carré (1956–65) in France, and the Nordic House (1962−68) in Reykjavik. Projects known to be Elissa Aalto’s independent designs include the SOS Children’s Village in Tapiola, Espoo (1964–65), and the private house Villa Hauta-aho (1982–83) in Seinäjoki. In her printed-fabric designs for Artek her architectural creativity took the form of the graphic patterns H55, Pisa and Patio. The architect couple designed a summer residence for themselves, the Muuratsalo Experimental House (1952–54) on an island in Lake Päijänne, where they spent time in the summer. She was involved in all competition projects the office undertook.

Over the decades, Elissa Aalto’s role as a skilled mediator of Alvar Aalto’s ideas in the architect’s office grew greater. She ran the office in 1976−1994, bringing to completion several unfinished building projects, among them the Church of the Cross in Lahti (1969–79) and Riola Church (1966‒80) in Italy, along with Essen opera house, Aalto Theatre, in Germany (1959, 1983–88). Jyväskylä City Theatre (1964–82), Seinäjoki City Theatre (1981–87) and Rovaniemi Town Hall (1963–88), completed under Elissa Aalto’s leadership, had already been added to Aalto-designed city centres. The architect’s office worked on the repair and alteration of Alvar Aalto’s buildings, the longest-lasting task being the Vyborg Library restoration project (1927–35).

Elissa Aalto also played a sizeable role in the setting up of the Alvar Aalto Foundation, which fosters Aalto’s heritage, in 1968. Following Alvar Aalto’s death, she was extensively involved in the discussion about his architectural heritage and the preservation of his buildings. She facilitated the transfer of the Alvar Aalto’s office’s drawing, photograph and document collection to the ownership of the Alvar Aalto Foundation, thus keeping the collection all in one place.

Elissa Aalto died in 1994 and was buried in Hietaniemi cemetery, Helsinki, with her husband.
