= Seinäjoki Library =

Library in Finland

- Seinäjoen kaupunginkirjasto
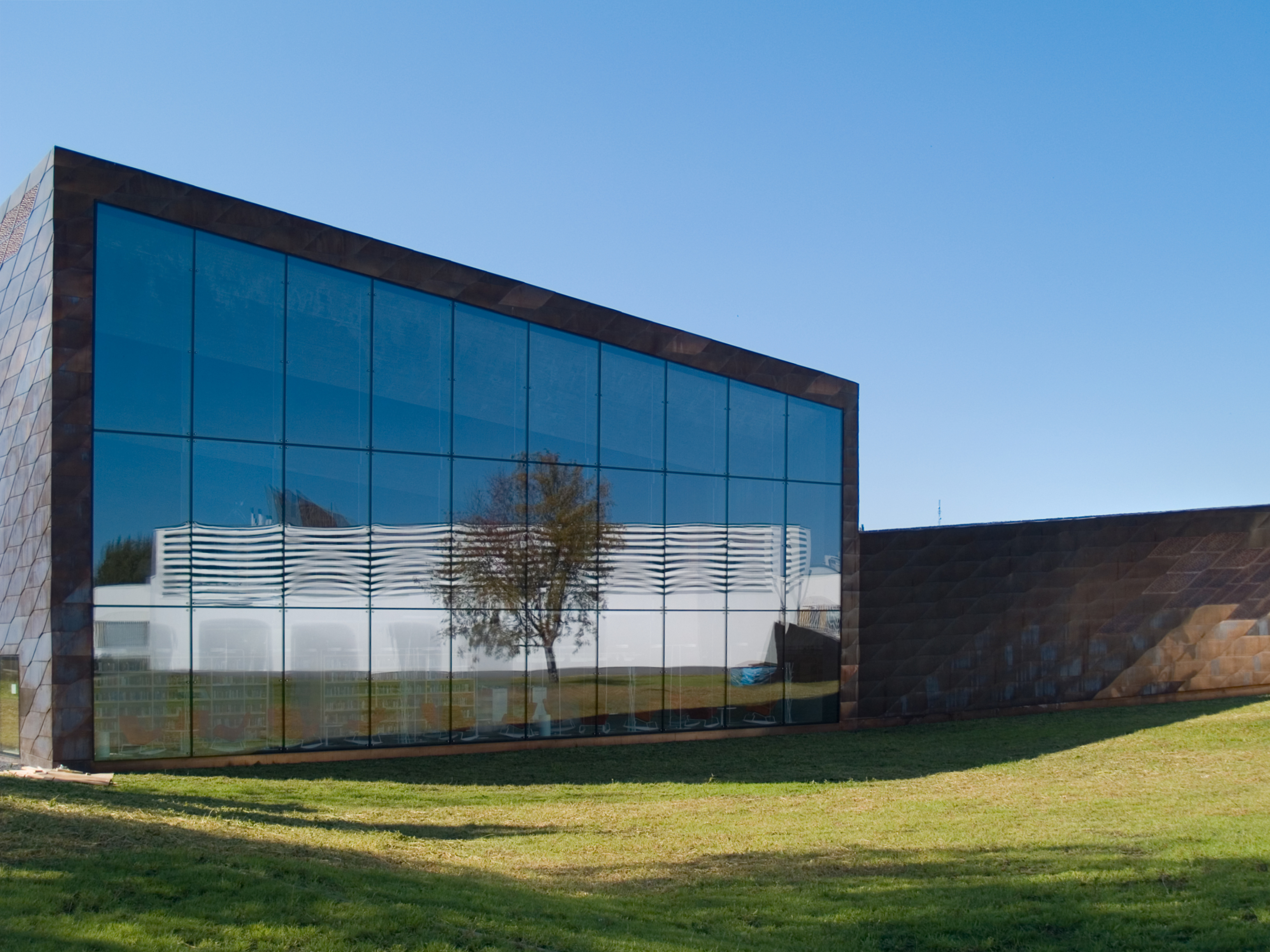
- The new Apila library building, with the original, white Aalto building reflected in the windows
- 62.785893°N 22.842304°E
- Location: Seinäjoki, Finland
- Type: Public library
- Established: 1865
- Branches: 6

Collection
- Items collected: Books, music, films, etc.
- Size: c. 440,000 (2019)

Other information
- Website: kirjasto.seinajoki.fi/english/

Seinäjoki Library (Finnish: Seinäjoen kaupunginkirjasto) is the municipal public library of the city of Seinäjoki, in Finland.

== Overview ==
Library provision in Seinäjoki first began in 1865, initially as an adjunct to the local church. By the start of the 20th century it had been taken over by the municipality, and was being run as part of the local school. The first dedicated librarian wasn't appointed until 1960, when Seinäjoki was granted its city status.

From 1968 until 2017 the library also served as the South Ostrobothnia regional library, until the regional library network was replaced by a new regional development library (Alueellista kehittämistehtävää hoitavat kirjasto) structure.

In addition to the central library, the operation comprises six smaller units in the vicinity, in previously separate towns and villages such as Nurmo and Ylistaro which have since been merged with Seinäjoki. It also operates two mobile libraries.

The total collection size is over 440,000, of which c. 370,000 are books.

== Architecture ==
=== Aalto building ===
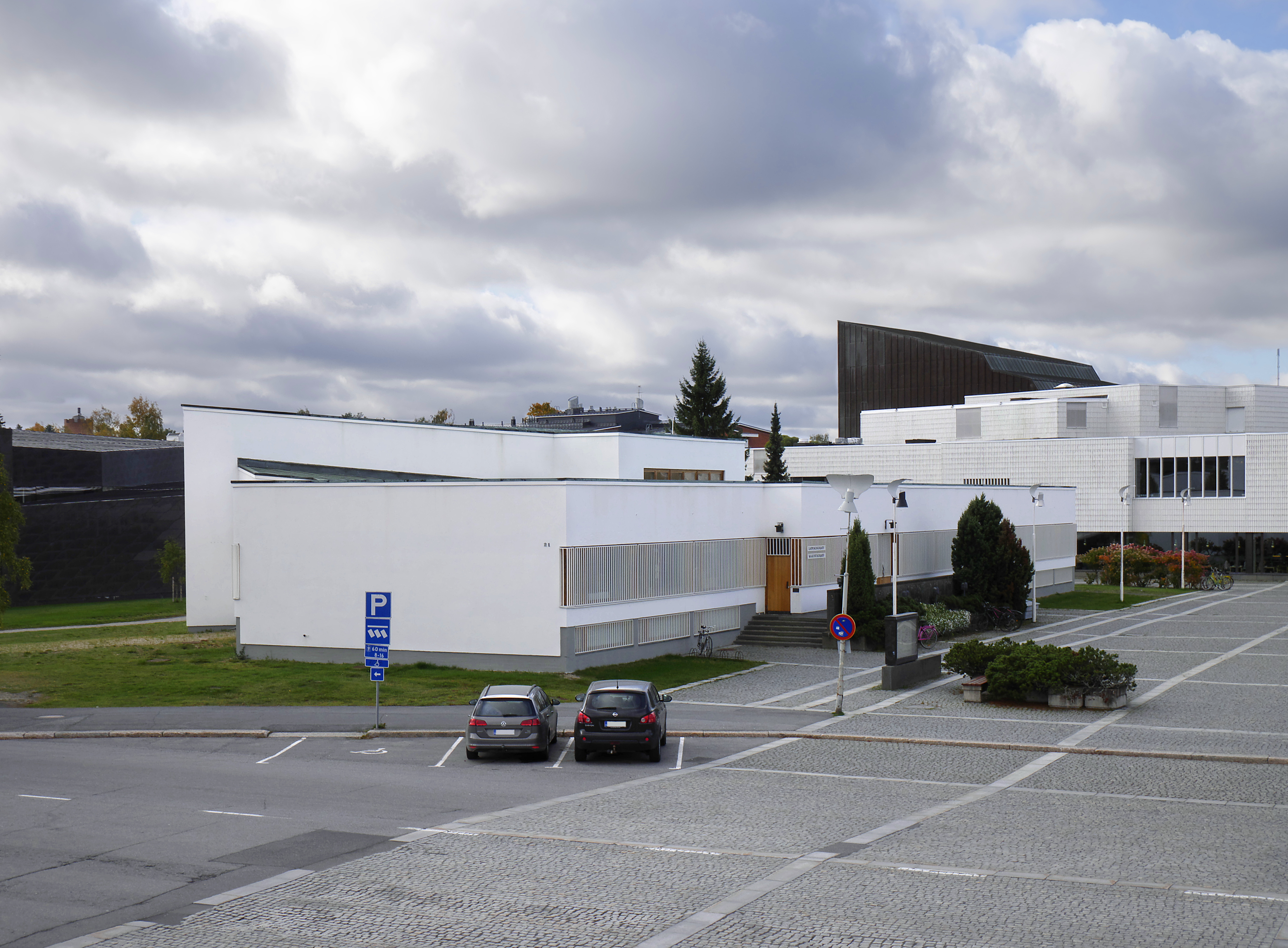
Original Aalto building, opened in 1965

The original central library building, Aalto, is notable for having been designed by the renowned Finnish architect Alvar Aalto. It was completed in 1965 for the 100th anniversary of the city's library operations. The building's overall design is fan-shaped, which is a common feature in many of Aalto's later works.

Along with other prominent Aalto-designed buildings such as the City Hall and City Theatre, the Aalto library forms part of the city's Aalto Centre (Finnish: Aalto-keskus), which has been recognised by the Finnish Heritage Agency as a nationally important built cultural environment (Valtakunnallisesti merkittävä rakennettu kulttuuriympäristö).

=== Apila building ===
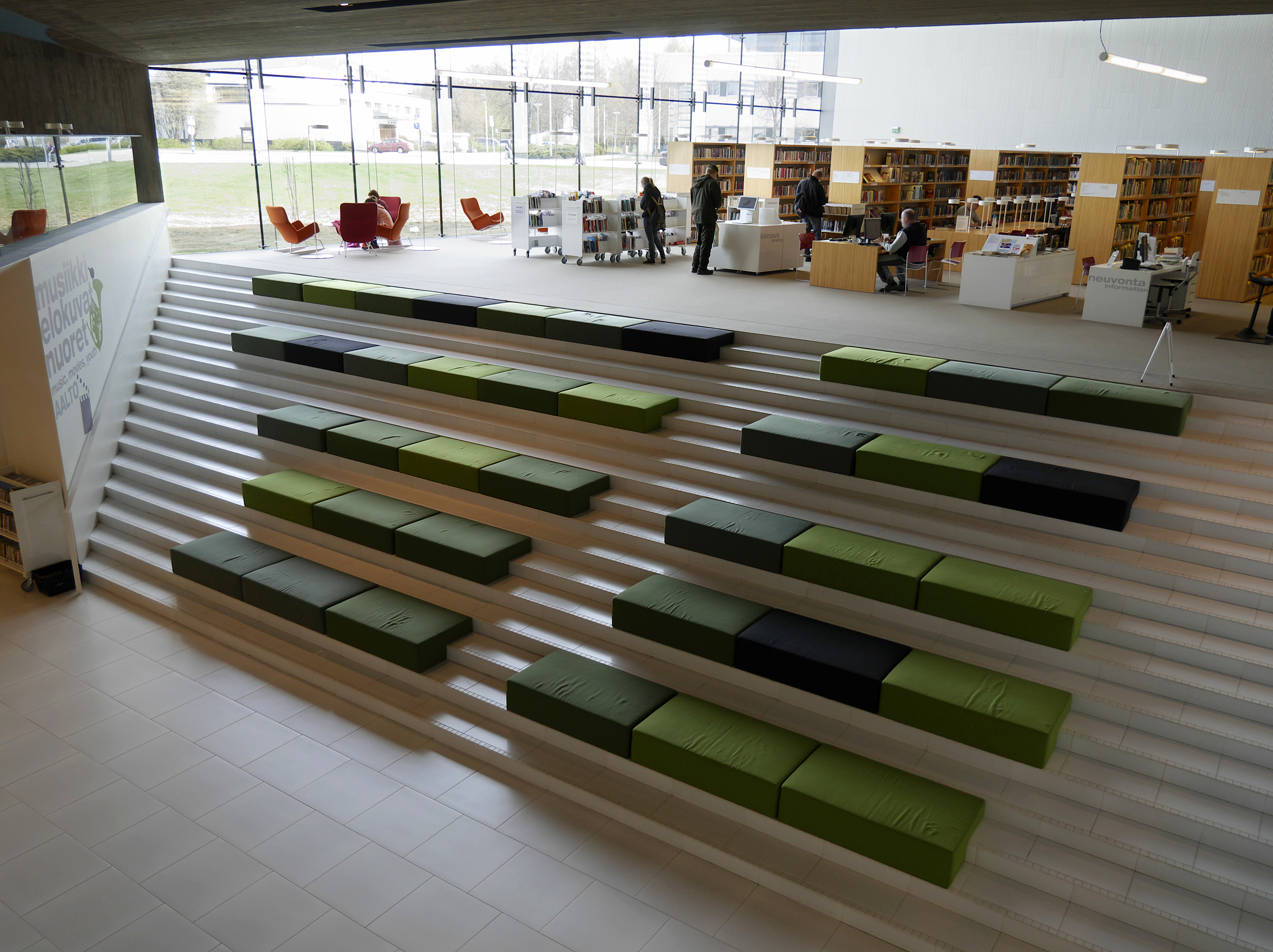
Interior of the new Apila building, opened in 2012

Designed by JKMM Architects and opened in 2012, the new central library building Apila ('Clover') expanded the library's limited capacity and facilities considerably.

Intended to complement, not imitate, the Aalto building, the Apila has a number of design features referencing the older building, including the use of white surfaces and wooden (pine) structures in the interior, as well as the copper-tiled exterior (the Aalto has a copper-clad roof).

The two buildings are connected by an underground passage.

Apila was chosen as the 2012 'Concrete Building of the Year' in Finland.

== See also ==
- Aalto Centre, Seinäjoki
- List of libraries in Finland
