= Seinäjoki City Theatre =

Theatre in Seinäjoki, Finland

- Seinäjoen kaupunginteatteri
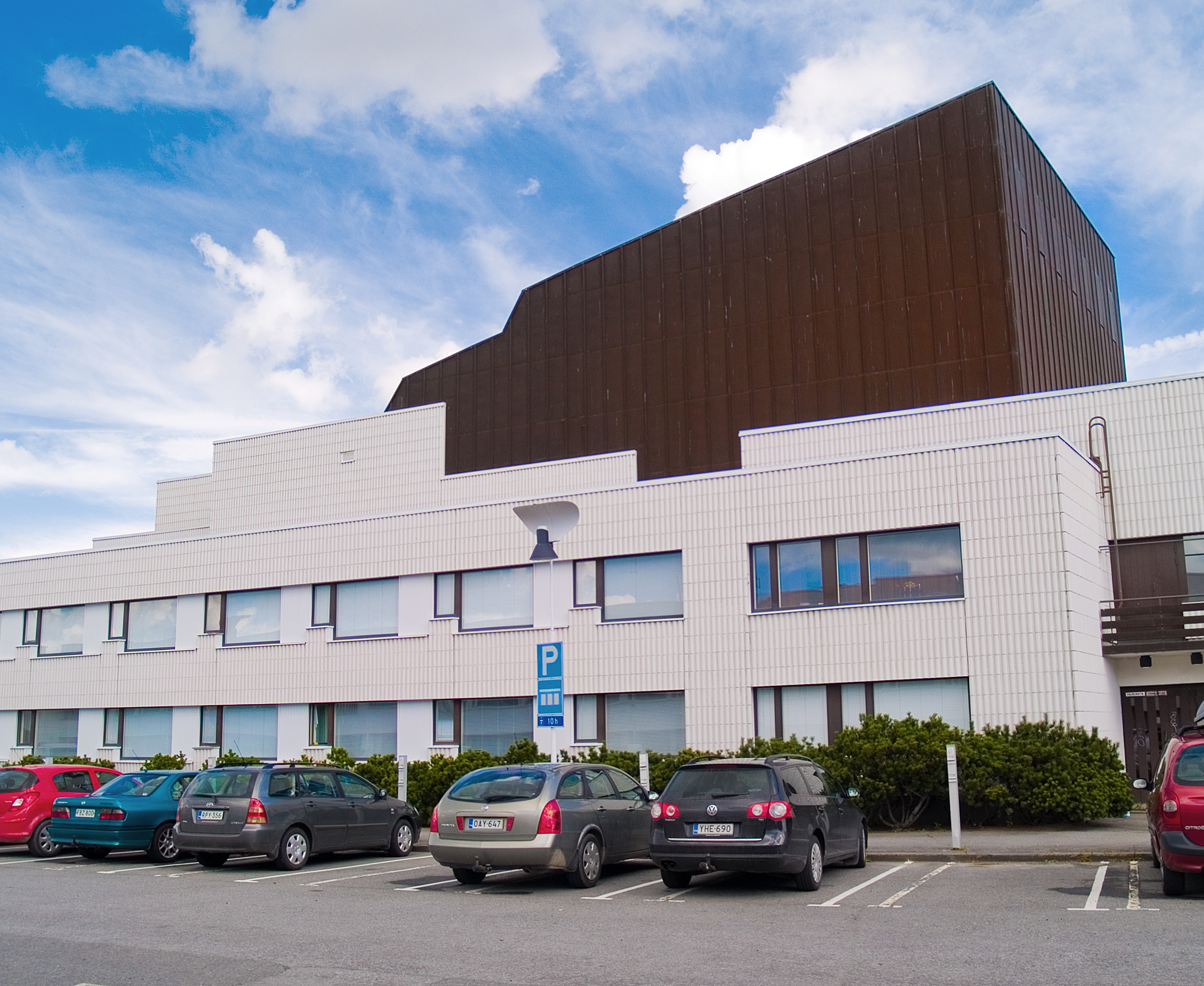
- Interactive map of Seinäjoki City Theatre
- Address: Seinäjoki; Finland
- Coordinates: 62.785844°N 22.840978°E
- Owner: City of Seinäjoki
- Capacity: 689 (total)
- Type: Public Theatre

Construction
- Opened: 1987
- Architect: Alvar Aalto

Website
- seinajoenkaupunginteatteri.fi

The Seinäjoki City Theatre (Finnish: Seinäjoen kaupunginteatteri) is the municipal theatre of the city of Seinäjoki, Finland.

== Architecture ==
The theatre building is notable for having been designed by the renowned Finnish architect Alvar Aalto. He sketched the initial designs already in 1968, although the building was only completed nearly two decades later in 1987. Aalto himself had died in 1976, therefore the design was finalised and the construction supervised by his widow and fellow architect, Elissa Aalto.

Situated alongside other prominent Aalto-designed buildings such as the City Hall and Lakeuden Risti Church, the theatre forms part of the city's Aalto Centre (Finnish: Aalto-keskus), which has been recognised by the Finnish Heritage Agency as a nationally important built cultural environment (Valtakunnallisesti merkittävä rakennettu kulttuuriympäristö).

== Capacity ==
The theatre comprises four stages, with a total seating capacity of 689. Of these, the largest, 'Alvar', seats 409; 'Elissa', 100; 'Verstas', 60; and the restaurant theatre 120.

The theatre company also operates an open air theatre in the summer, with a capacity for 890.

The theatre attracts audiences in excess of 50,000 annually.

== Recognition ==
In 2015, the Seinäjoki City Theatre was chosen as the 'Theatre of the Year' by the Association of Finnish Theatres.
