= Mannerheim Park, Seinäjoki =

Park in Seinäjoki, Finland

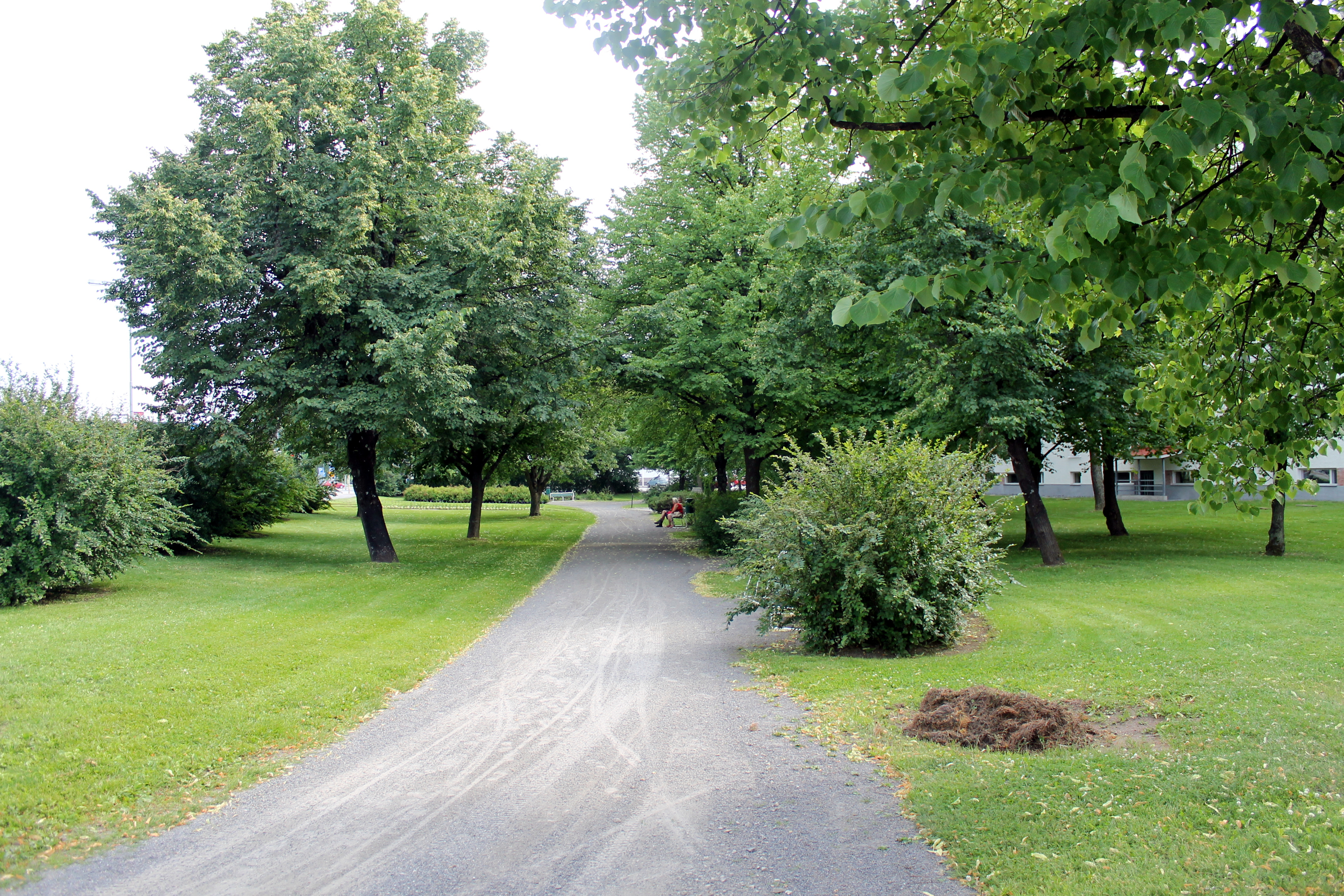
The Mannerheim Park along the Koulukatu street in Seinäjoki

The Mannerheim Park (Finnish: Mannerheimin puisto) is a small urban park located in the city center of Seinäjoki, Finland, near the Aalto Center and the Torikeskus shopping center. The Mannerheim Park is located at the corner of the Kirkkokatu and Koulukatu streets, next to Seinäjoki Lyceum. The Lakeudenpuisto park is located opposite the Mannerheim Park.

The park is named after a statue of Marshal Mannerheim in the park. The statue, sculpted by Lauri Leppänen, was unveiled on June 4, 1955. It was originally erected on the central square, from where it was moved to its current location in 1973. is located in Seinäjoki at the corner of Kirkkokatu and Koulukatu, next to Seinäjoki Lyceum. During the renovation of the Mannerheim Park in 2014, the sculpture got a higher pedestal and got a little closer to the street edge. The statue is Finland's first Mannerheim monument, and it was erected to commemorate the fact that during the Finnish Civil War, Mannerheim held its headquarters in Seinäjoki for the longest time.

== See also ==
- Mannerheim Park, Oulu
