= Church of the Three Crosses =

- Vuoksenniska Church
- Finnish: Kolmen Ristin kirkko
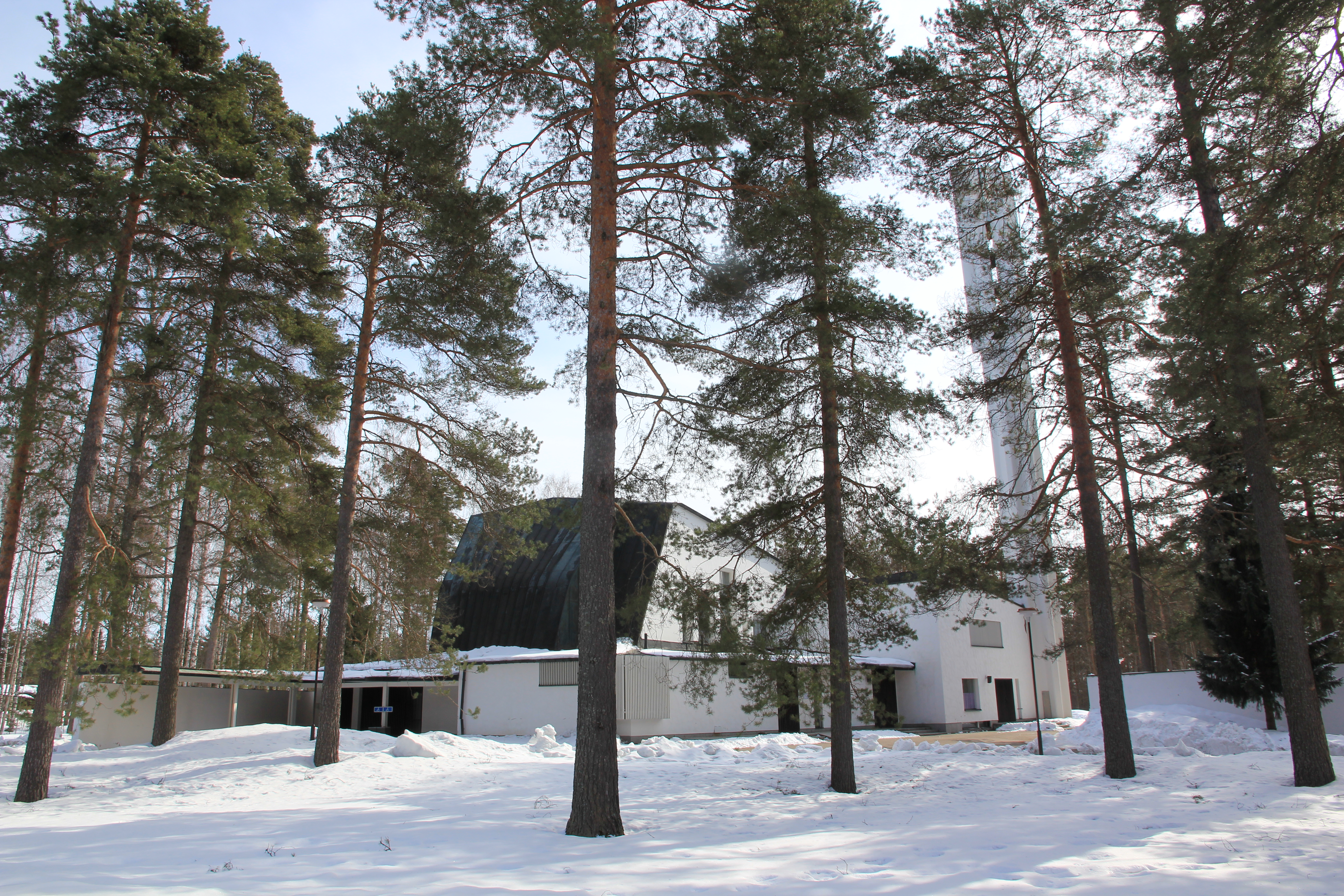
- Church of the Three Crosses in the winter.
- Church of the Three Crosses
- 61°14′12″N 028°51′22″E
- Location: Kaukopää, Imatra
- Country: Finland
- Denomination: Lutheran

Architecture
- Architect: Alvar Aalto
- Style: Modern
- Completed: 1958

Administration
- Parish: Imatra

UNESCO World Heritage Site
- Official name: Church of Three Crosses, Imatra
- Part of: Aalto Works
- Criteria: Cultural: ii
- Reference: 1752
- Inscription: 2026 (48th Session)

Church of the Three Crosses (Finnish: Kolmen Ristin kirkko; also known as Vuoksenniska Church) is a Lutheran church located in Kaukopää, Imatra, Finland. The church was designed by Alvar Aalto and completed in 1958. It is said to be Aalto's most original church design. The church gets its name from the three crosses at the altar.

The church consists of three consecutive halls which can be separated by sliding walls; this enables parts of the church to be used for parish activities during the week. The exterior of the church is white with a copper roofing.

Docomomo has listed the church as a significant example of modern architecture in Finland. The Finnish Heritage Agency has also listed it as a nationally significant built heritage site. A committee designated by the Finnish Heritage Agency in 1998 to commemorate the centenary of Aalto's birth selected the church as one of the five most important buildings designed by Aalto. In July 2026, the Church of the Three Crosses, along with 12 other Aalto Works, was designated by UNESCO as a World Heritage Site.

== Gallery ==
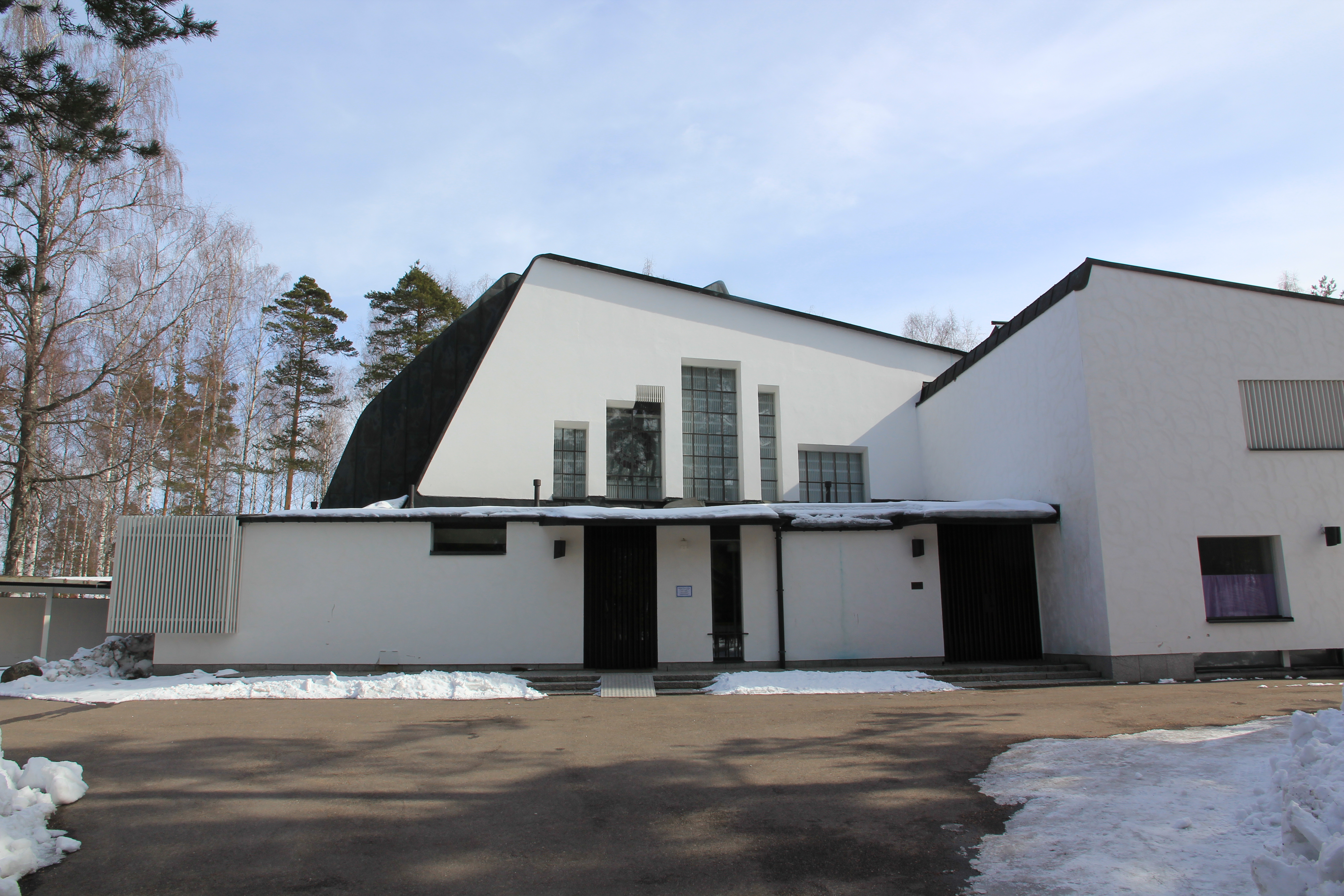
Exterior view

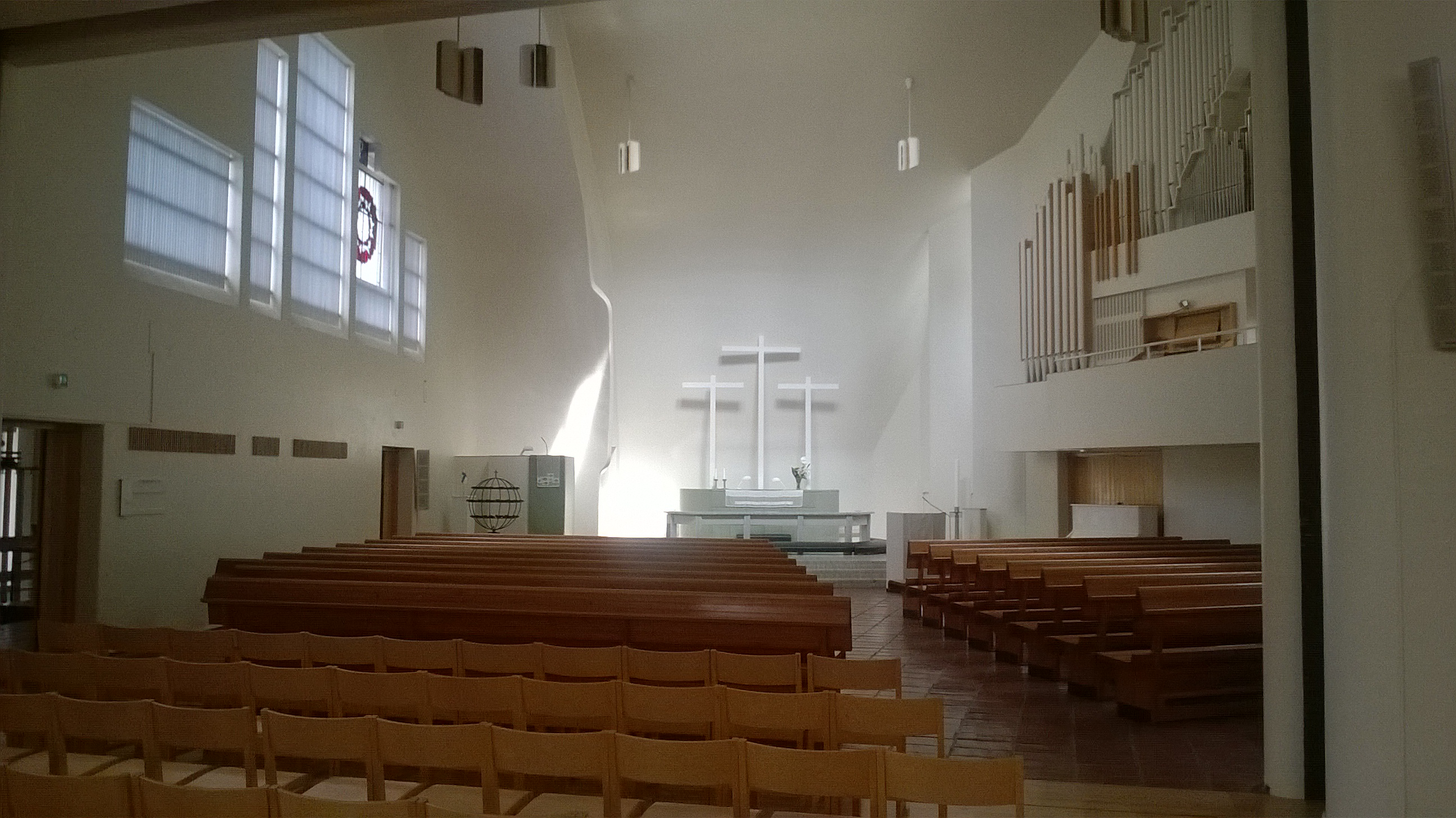
Interior view

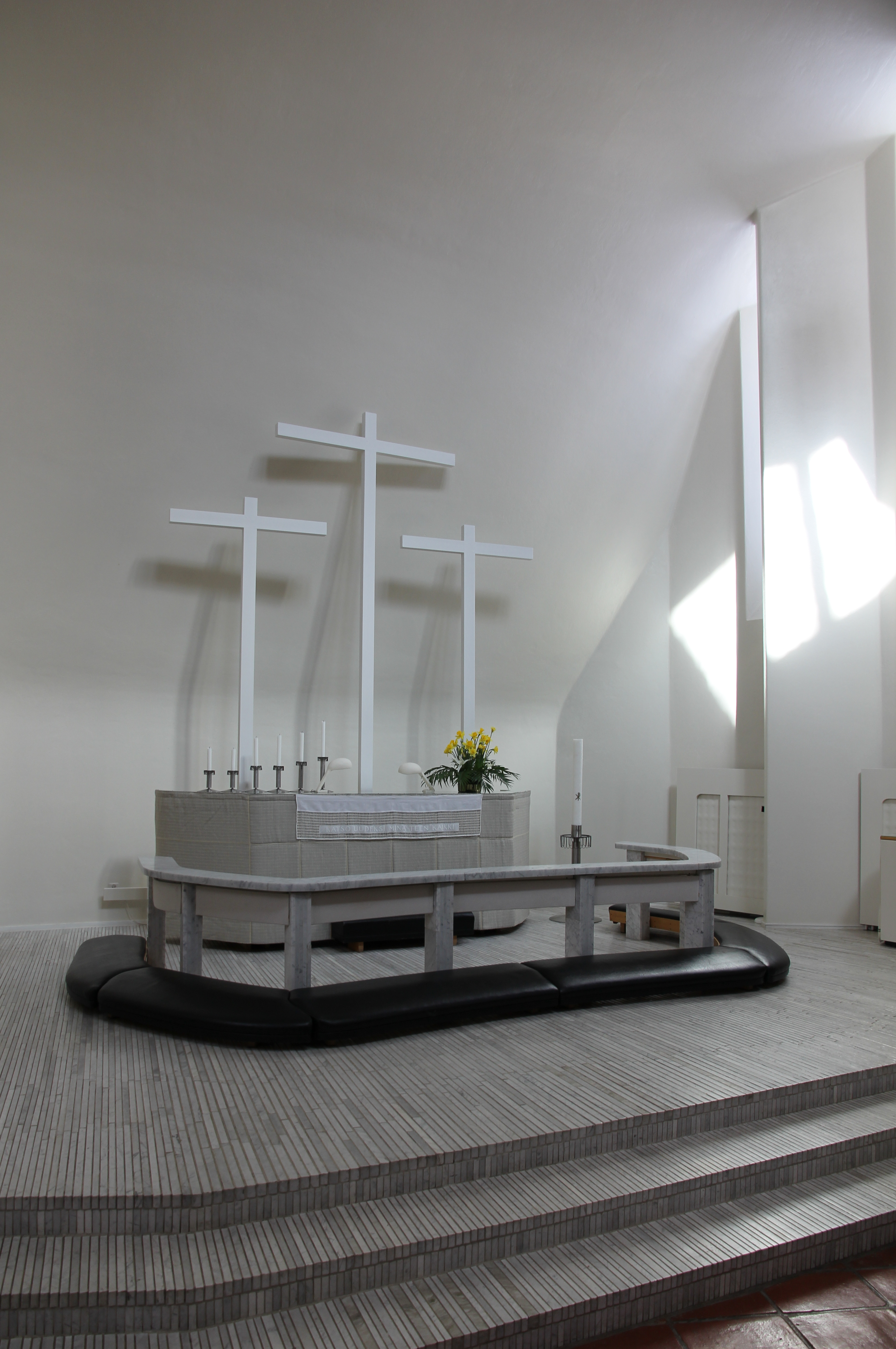
The three crosses at the altar

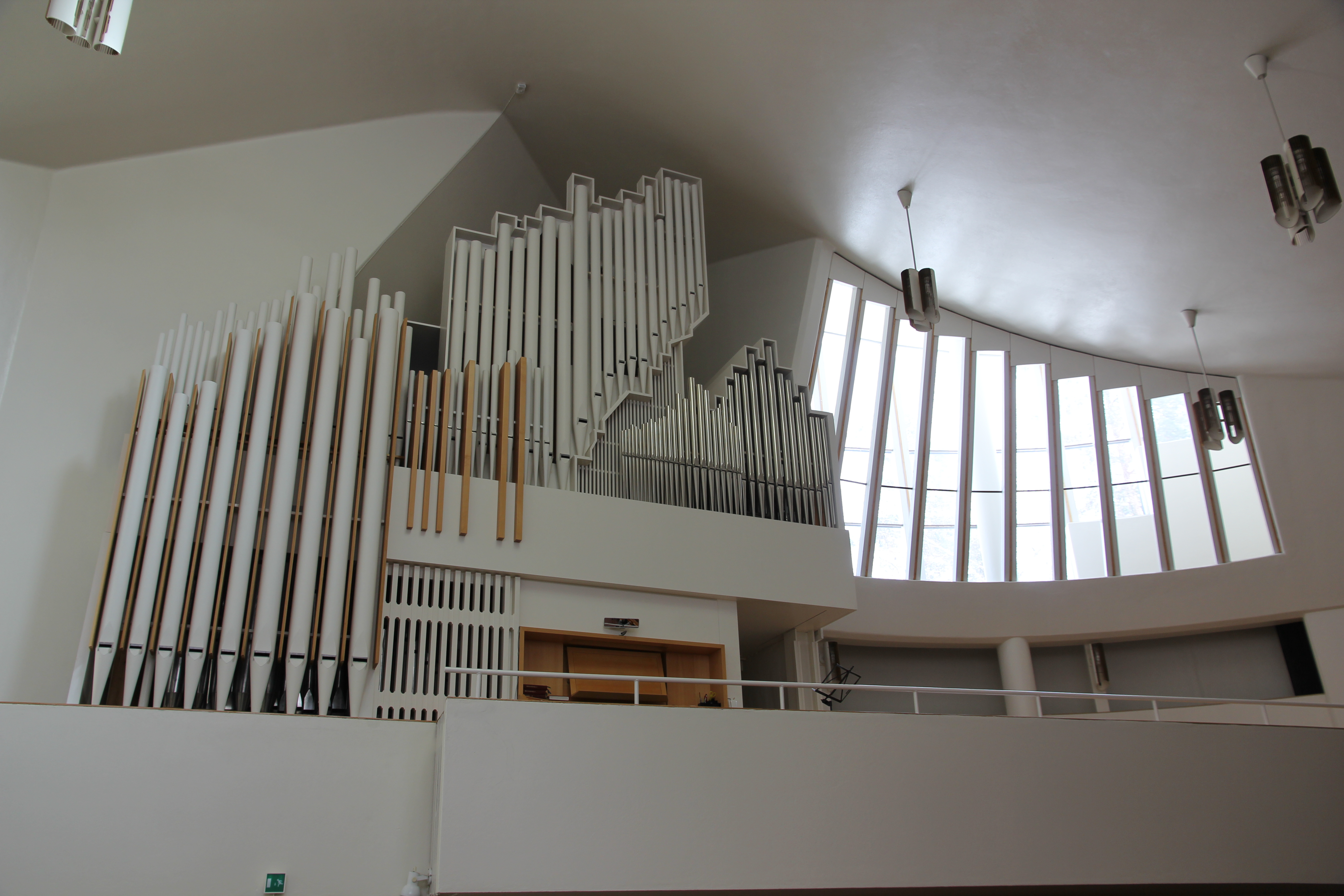
The church organ

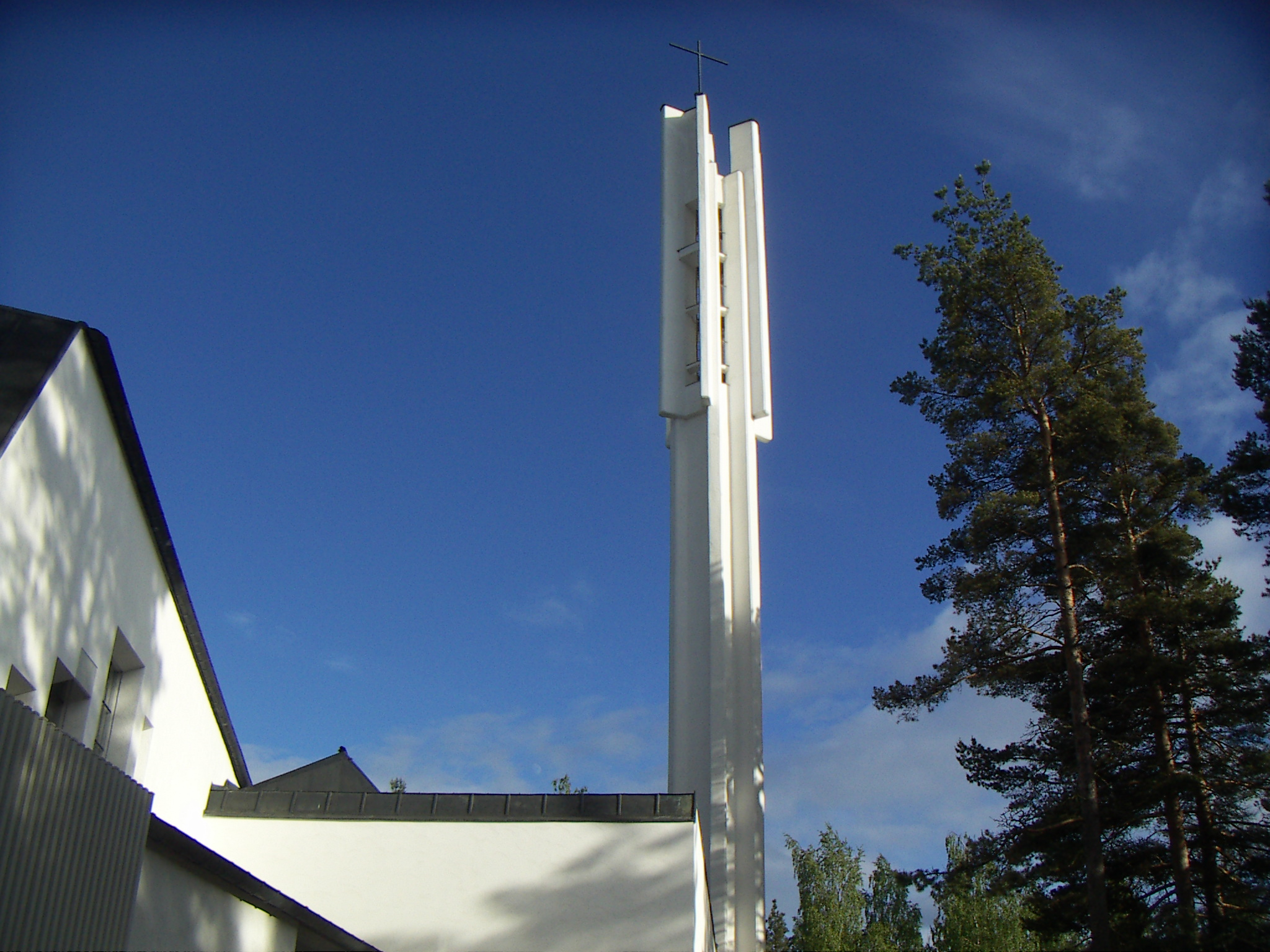
The bell tower

== See also ==
- Lakeuden Risti Church, Seinäjoki
- Church of the Assumption of Mary, Riola di Vergato
- Church of the Holy Spirit, Wolfsburg
