= Seinäjoki =

- City
- Seinäjoen kaupunki Seinäjoki stad
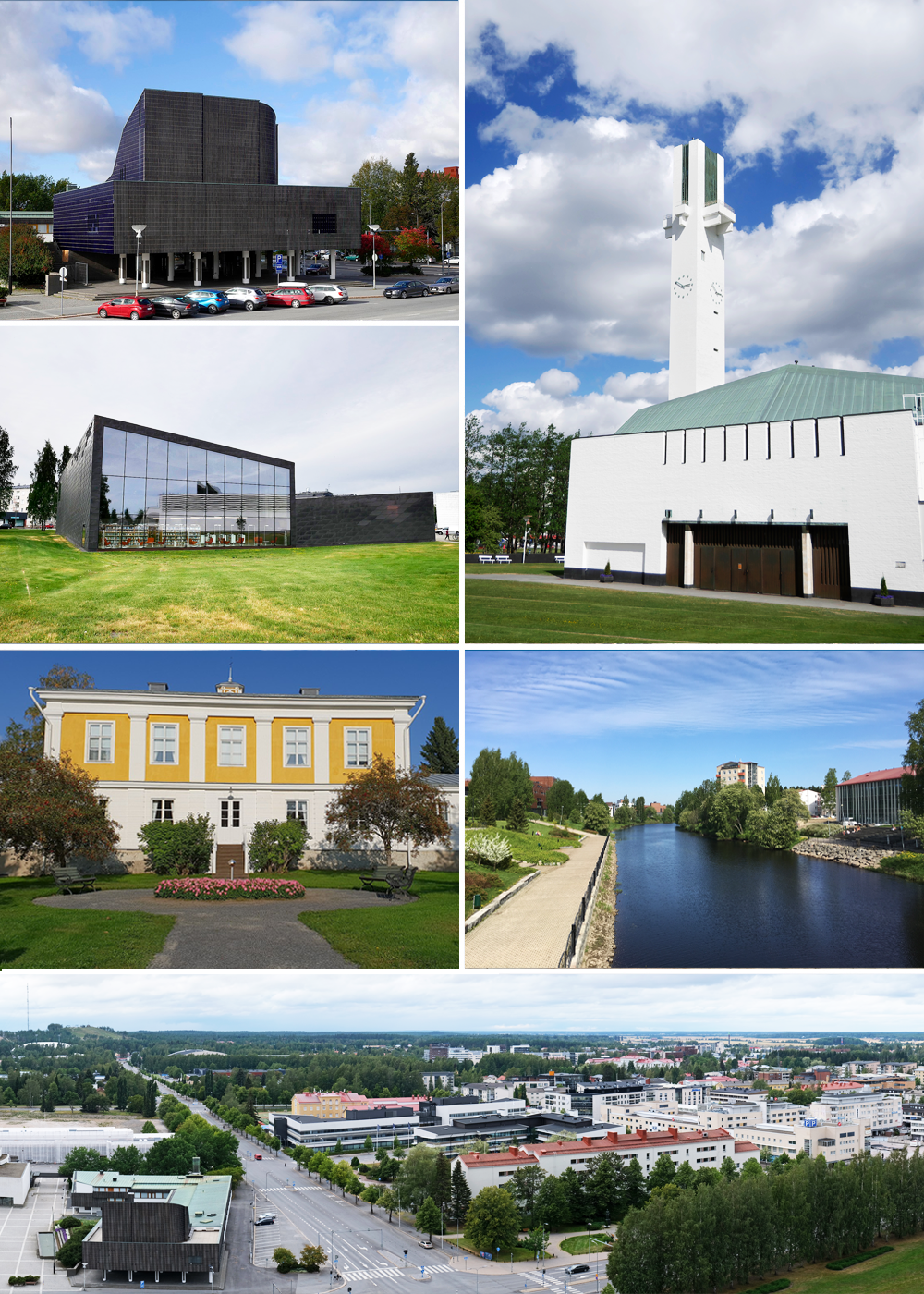

- Coat of arms

- Location of Seinäjoki in Finland
- Interactive map of Seinäjoki
- Coordinates: 62°47.5′N 022°50.5′E
- Country: Finland
- Region: South Ostrobothnia
- Sub-region: Seinäjoki
- Charter (Seinäjoki mlk): 1868
- Market town established: 1931
- Town: 1960

Government
  - City manager: Jaakko Kiiskilä

Area (2018-01-01)
  - City: 1,469.23 km^{2} (567.27 sq mi)
  - Land: 1,431.77 km^{2} (552.81 sq mi)
  - Water: 37.59 km^{2} (14.51 sq mi)
  - Urban: 52.78 km^{2} (20.38 sq mi)
  - Rank: 48th largest in Finland

Population (2025-12-31)
  - City: 67,283
  - Rank: 16th largest in Finland
  - Density: 46.99/km^{2} (121.7/sq mi)
  - Urban: 46,639
  - Urban density: 883.6/km^{2} (2,289/sq mi)

Population by native language
  - Finnish: 93.6% (official)
  - Swedish: 0.2%
  - Others: 6.1%

Population by age
  - 0 to 14: 17.1%
  - 15 to 64: 62.5%
  - 65 or older: 20.4%
- Time zone: UTC+02:00 (EET)
  - Summer (DST): UTC+03:00 (EEST)
- Website: www.seinajoki.fi/en/

Seinäjoki (Finnish: [ˈsei̯næˌjoki]; lit. "Wall River"; Latin: Wegelia, formerly Swedish: Östermyra) is a city in Finland and the regional capital of South Ostrobothnia. Seinäjoki is located in the western interior of the country and along the River Seinäjoki. The population of Seinäjoki is approximately 67,000, while the sub-region has a population of approximately 132,000. It is the 16th most populous municipality in Finland, and the 13th most populous urban area in the country.

Seinäjoki is located 80 kilometres (50 mi) east of Vaasa, 178 kilometres (111 mi) north of Tampere, 193 kilometres (120 mi) west of Jyväskylä and 324 kilometres (201 mi) southwest of Oulu.

Seinäjoki originated around the Östermyra bruk iron and gunpowder factories founded in 1798. Seinäjoki became a municipality in 1868, a market town in 1931, and a town in 1960. In 2005, the municipality of Peräseinäjoki was merged into Seinäjoki, and at the start of 2009, the neighbouring municipalities of Nurmo and Ylistaro were amalgamated with Seinäjoki. The city itself is growing steadily from year to year, but the population of the surrounding municipalities is correspondingly decreasing.

The city hall, city library, Lakeuden Risti Church and other public buildings were designed by Alvar Aalto. Seinäjoki was historically called Östermyra in Swedish. Today, this name, which was never official, is very seldom used even among Swedish speakers. Seinäjoki Airport is located in the neighbouring municipality of Ilmajoki, 11 kilometres (10 mi) south from the Seinäjoki city centre. Seinäjoki railway station in city centre was opened in 1883 and until 1897, it carried the name Ostermyra station.

== History ==
The settlement spread in the area of the present Seinäjoki during the first half of the 16th century. During the 1550s, there is said to have been three houses in Seinäjoki: the houses of Marttila, Jouppi and Uppa. The house of Jouppila, which separated from the house of Jouppi, was established during the same century. All of the houses were located on the shore of the river.

Seinäjoki belonged to the church parish of Ilmajoki like Kurikka, Kauhajoki, Jalasjärvi and Alavus. However, in the 18th century the roads from Seinäjoki to the Church of Ilmajoki were generally in poor condition. Therefore, the inhabitants of Seinäjoki and the neighbouring Nurmo built a new chapel together in 1725, which in 1765 led to the formation of the chapel town of Nurmo. Seinäjoki, which was called Alaseinäjoki since the Greater Wrath, became a part of the chapel town. The chapel parish of Peräseinäjoki was founded in 1798, and the village of Alaseinäjoki began to be called Seinäjoki again. The very same year, the Östermyra steel mill was founded on the shore of the Seinäjoki river.

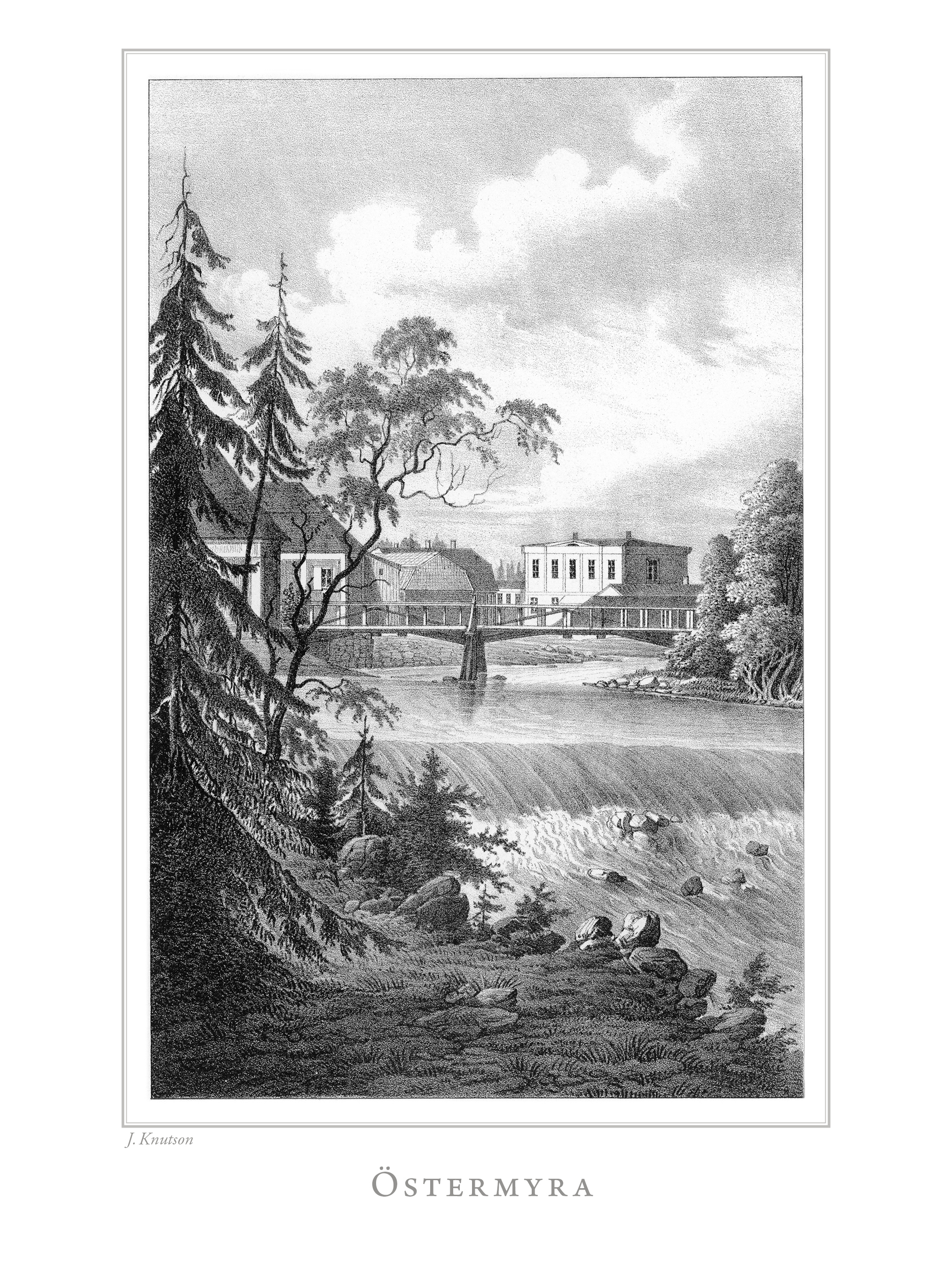
Illustration in Finland framstäldt i teckningar edited by Zacharias Topelius and published 1845–1852.

In the 1850s, actions were taken to separate Seinäjoki from the church parish of Nurmo. Ilmajoki wanted to connect Seinäjoki back to its own parish. In spite of strong objections from the inhabitants of Nurmo, the Senate of Finland accepted the petition from the inhabitants of Seinäjoki in 1863, to form a chapel congregation of their own. Seinäjoki got an independent local government in 1868. In 1900, Seinäjoki became an independent municipality.

Seinäjoki has grown around a few important railroad crossings. The Tampere–Vaasa railway, which passes through Seinäjoki, was inaugurated in 1883. The track, along with the Kokkola track that was opened for rail service in 1885, and the Kristinestad track which had been completed in 1913, raised Seinäjoki as an important railway crossing section in Finland. In the early 1970s, a direct railway between Tampere and Seinäjoki was opened, and the services of Seinäjoki improved further.

After the Winter War and Continuation War, some refugees from Jaakkima and Lumivaara were resettled to Seinäjoki.

== Geography ==
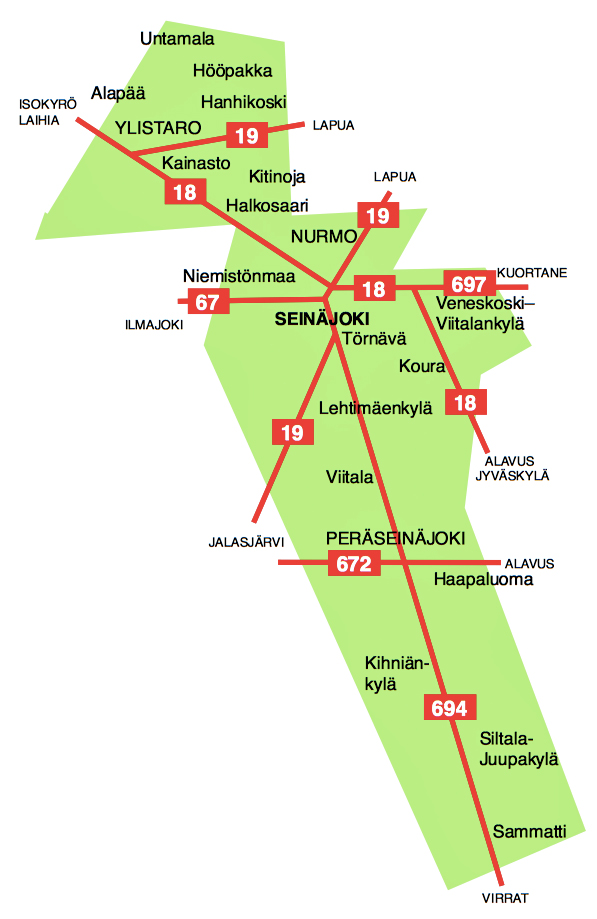
A map of the Seinäjoki municipality with main roads and villages

The neighboring municipalities of Seinäjoki are Kauhava in the north, Lapua in the northeast, Kuortane and Alavus in the east, Virrat and Kihniö in the south, Ilmajoki and Kurikka in the west and Isokyrö in the northwest.

The proportion of water in the Seinäjoki landscape is small. Seinäjoki River flows through the city in a south-east-northwest direction and turns at the northern border of the city center, connecting with the Kyrönjoki River, which flows into the Gulf of Bothnia in the Vaasa area.

The most significant road connections in Seinäjoki are highways 16, 18 (between cities of Vaasa and Jyväskylä), 19 and 67.

=== Climate ===
Climate data for Seinäjoki Pelmaa (1991-2020 normals, extremes 1959–present)
Month	Jan	Feb	Mar	Apr	May	Jun	Jul	Aug	Sep	Oct	Nov	Dec	Year
Record high °C (°F)	8.6 (47.5)	9.8 (49.6)	15.4 (59.7)	24.5 (76.1)	29.2 (84.6)	32.6 (90.7)	33.6 (92.5)	31.5 (88.7)	27.7 (81.9)	20.6 (69.1)	12.9 (55.2)	9.1 (48.4)	33.6 (92.5)
Mean maximum °C (°F)	4.3 (39.7)	4.1 (39.4)	8.9 (48.0)	17.1 (62.8)	24.5 (76.1)	26.8 (80.2)	28.3 (82.9)	26.9 (80.4)	21.4 (70.5)	13.9 (57.0)	8.3 (46.9)	5.0 (41.0)	29.3 (84.7)
Mean daily maximum °C (°F)	−2.6 (27.3)	−2.7 (27.1)	1.7 (35.1)	8.2 (46.8)	15.0 (59.0)	19.5 (67.1)	22.1 (71.8)	20.5 (68.9)	15.0 (59.0)	7.4 (45.3)	2.1 (35.8)	−0.8 (30.6)	8.8 (47.8)
Daily mean °C (°F)	−5.6 (21.9)	−6.2 (20.8)	−3.5 (25.7)	3.3 (37.9)	9.2 (48.6)	14.1 (57.4)	16.7 (62.1)	14.9 (58.8)	10.0 (50.0)	4.3 (39.7)	−0.1 (31.8)	−4.3 (24.3)	4.6 (40.3)
Mean daily minimum °C (°F)	−9.2 (15.4)	−10.1 (13.8)	−6.8 (19.8)	−1.1 (30.0)	3.1 (37.6)	8.1 (46.6)	11.0 (51.8)	9.6 (49.3)	5.5 (41.9)	1.3 (34.3)	−2.5 (27.5)	−6.4 (20.5)	0.2 (32.4)
Mean minimum °C (°F)	−23.5 (−10.3)	−23.6 (−10.5)	−18.9 (−2.0)	−8.4 (16.9)	−3.4 (25.9)	1.4 (34.5)	4.2 (39.6)	2.2 (36.0)	−2.6 (27.3)	−7.7 (18.1)	−13.0 (8.6)	−18.6 (−1.5)	−27.1 (−16.8)
Record low °C (°F)	−40.5 (−40.9)	−43.6 (−46.5)	−31.4 (−24.5)	−21.1 (−6.0)	−7.6 (18.3)	−3.0 (26.6)	−0.8 (30.6)	−2.4 (27.7)	−7.4 (18.7)	−22.8 (−9.0)	−29.4 (−20.9)	−37.3 (−35.1)	−43.6 (−46.5)
Average precipitation mm (inches)	32 (1.3)	24 (0.9)	26 (1.0)	28 (1.1)	46 (1.8)	59 (2.3)	74 (2.9)	73 (2.9)	54 (2.1)	58 (2.3)	47 (1.9)	40 (1.6)	561 (22.1)
Average relative humidity (%)	90	87	80	74	68	70	77	80	85	90	93	92	82
Mean monthly sunshine hours	30	71	145	189	267	276	268	207	140	80	31	17	1,718
Source 1: FMI normals for Finland 1991-2020
Source 2: Record highs and lows

== Demographics ==
=== Population ===
Historical population
Year	Pop.	±% p.a.
1940	5,085	—
1972	38,296	+6.51%
1980	42,497	+1.31%
1990	47,182	+1.05%
2000	50,670	+0.72%
2010	57,811	+1.33%
2020	64,130	+1.04%
Source: Tilastollinen päätoimisto, Statistics Finland (1972-2020)

The city of Seinäjoki has 67,283 inhabitants, making it the 16th most populous municipality in Finland. The Seinäjoki region has a population of 132,226.

Population size 1990–2025
Year	Population
1990	47,182
1995	49,209
2000	50,670
2005	53,965
2010	57,811
2015	61,530
2020	64,130
2025	67,283

=== Languages ===
Population by
mother tongue (2025)
1. Finnish (93.6%)
2. Ukrainian (1.00%)
3. Russian (0.50%)
4. English (0.40%)
5. Sinhala (0.40%)
6. Bengali (0.40%)
7. Nepali (0.30%)
8. Other (3.40%)

Seinäjoki is a monolingual Finnish-speaking municipality. The majority of the population, 62,996 persons (93.6%), spoke Finnish as their first language. In addition, the number of Swedish speakers was 155 persons (0.2%) of the population. Foreign languages were spoken by 6.1% of the population. As English and Swedish are compulsory school subjects, functional bilingualism or trilingualism acquired through language studies is not uncommon.

At least 30 different languages are spoken in Seinäjoki. The most common foreign languages are Ukrainian (1.0%), Russian (0.5%), English (0.4%) and Sinhala (0.4%).

=== Immigration ===
Population by country of birth (2025)
Country of birth	Population	%
Finland	63,017	93.6
Ukraine	438	0.7
Soviet Union	401	0.6
Sweden	311	0.5
Sri Lanka	288	0.4
Bangladesh	227	0.3
Nepal	220	0.3
Thailand	191	0.3
Estonia	156	0.2
Turkey	148	0.2
Other	1,534	2.3

As of 2024, there were 3,651 persons with a foreign background living in Seinäjoki, or 6% of the population. (Note: Statistics Finland classifies a person as having a "foreign background" if both parents or the only known parent were born abroad.) The number of residents who were born abroad was 3,738, or 6% of the population. The number of persons with foreign citizenship living in Seinäjoki was 2,714. Most foreign-born citizens came from Ukraine, the former Soviet Union, Sweden and Sri Lanka.

The relative share of immigrants in Seinäjoki's population is below to the national average. However, the city's new residents are increasingly of foreign origin. This will increase the proportion of foreign residents in the coming years.

=== Religion ===
In 2023, the Evangelical Lutheran Church was the largest religious group with 76.7% of the population of Seinäjoki. Other religious groups accounted for 2.1% of the population. 21.2% of the population had no religious affiliation.

== Economy ==
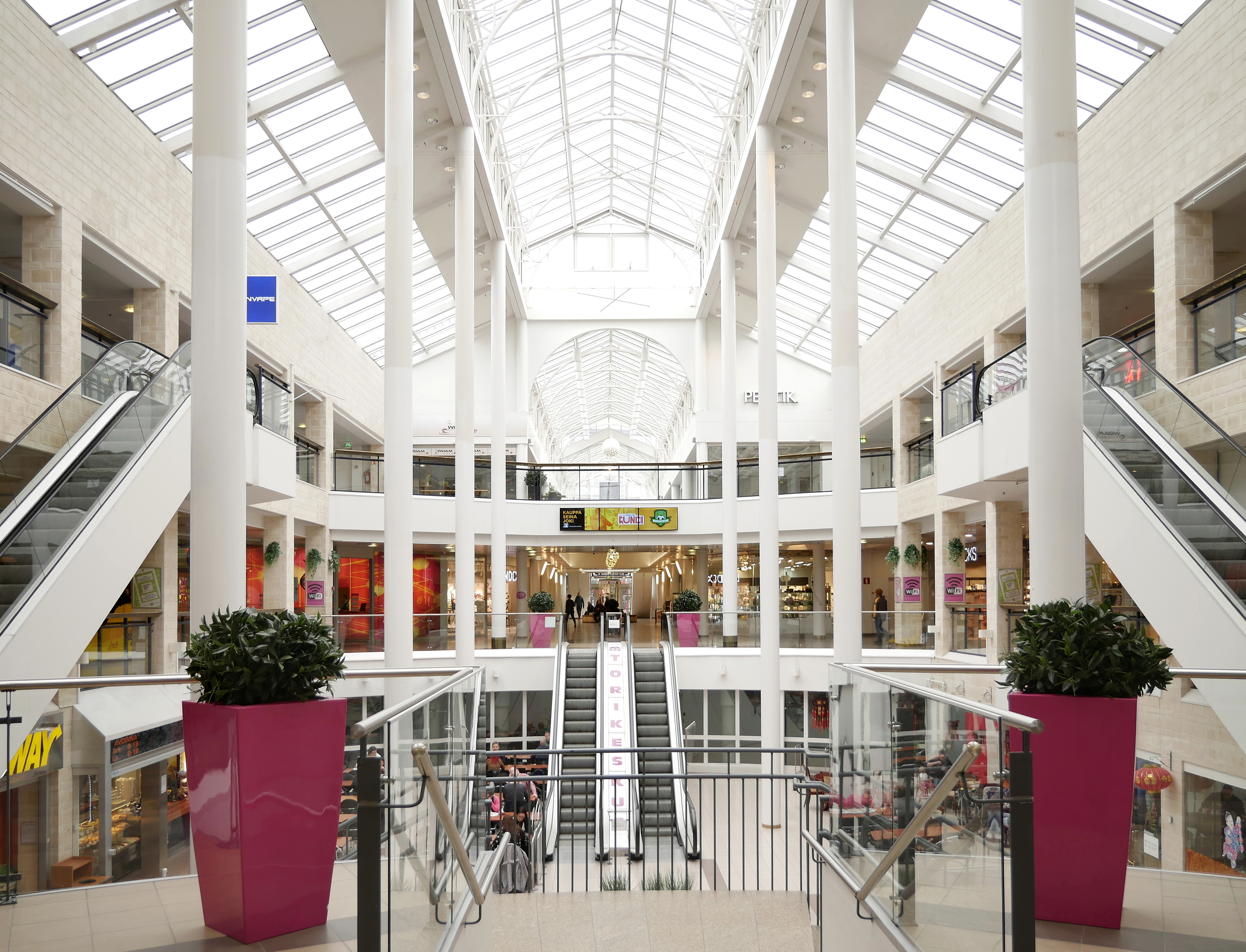
Interior of the Torikeskus shopping center in the city center

Nordic Regional Airlines has its financial office in Seinäjoki. Its predecessor, Finncomm Airlines, had its head office on the grounds of Seinäjoki Airport in nearby Ilmajoki.

In terms of market area, Seinäjoki is the sixth largest city in the country. Also Seinäjoki has a nationally and internationally significant food production and R&D industry. Headquartered in Seinäjoki food company Atria Corporation's net sales in 2009 were EUR 1316 million and it employed an average of 6,214 persons in several countries. According to a study published by the Economic Survey at the end of 2018, Seinäjoki has the best image among corporate leaders among the 36 largest Finnish cities and municipalities. The survey had asked the CEOs and CFOs of companies operating in the area about the municipality's affairs.

Seinäjoki also is well known for having a large number of SME's and a big number of shops for its size. One of the most important shopping places in Seinäjoki is the Torikeskus shopping mall in the city center.

== Culture ==
There are many kinds of cultural events in Seinäjoki nowadays. For example, Seinäjoki is known for hosting three large summer events: Tangomarkkinat, which is a tango festival typically attracting more than 100,000 visitors annually, Vauhtiajot, which is a motor racing event/music festival, and Provinssirock, which is one of the largest and oldest rock festivals in Finland. Rytmikorjaamo is a popular rock club, wherein almost every weekend some Finnish or international artists perform. In Seinäjoki there are also several other bars and clubs offering live music and other entertainment. The city theatre of Seinäjoki has a wide, quality program throughout the year, offering plays for everyone. The city orchestra of Seinäjoki performs many concerts in the area and has had many tours in Finland and abroad.

== Sport ==
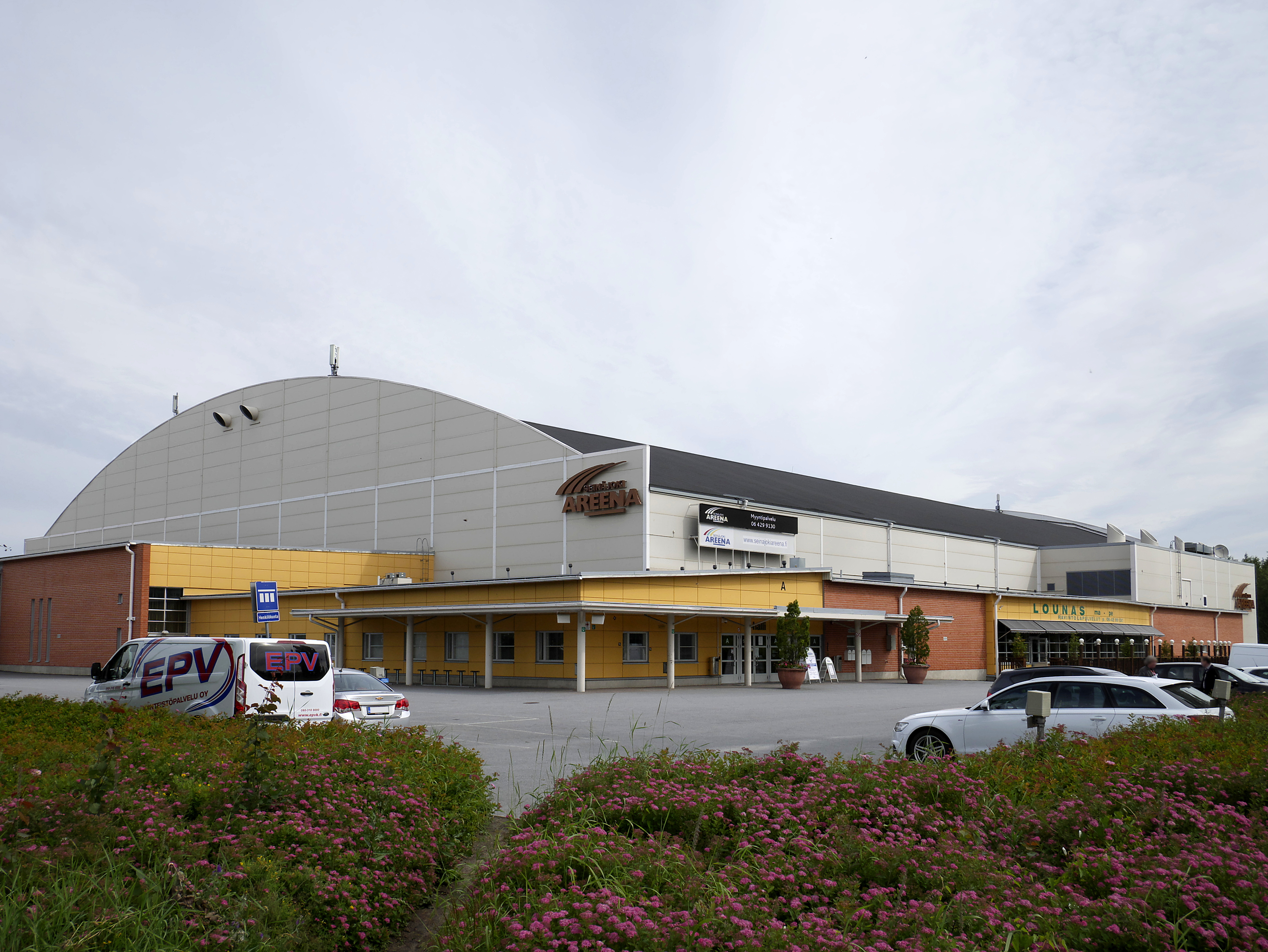
Seinäjoki Arena, a multi-purpose hall in Jouppila, Seinäjoki

Seinäjoki is home to a big number of sports clubs, such as SJK Seinäjoki, a professional football team that competes in the Finnish Veikkausliiga. SJK is one of the top football teams in Finland and it plays in the brand new OmaSp Stadion. Seinäjoki is also home to Seinäjoki Crocodiles, an American football team.

Seinäjoki Speedway track is a motorcycle speedway venue located on the south east outskirts of the city, off the Routakalliontie road by the quarry. The track held a qualifying round of the Speedway World Team Cup in 1992 and has held the final of the Finnish Individual Speedway Championship on 11 occasions from 1986 to 2020.

Seinäjoen JymyJussit and Seinäjoen Maila-Jussit are the city's men's and women's pesäpallo teams respectively in the Superpesis national league, playing at Seinäjoki Pesäpallo Stadium.

== Sights ==
- Lakeuden Risti Church ("The Cross of the Plains")
- Alvar Aalto's cultural and administrative centre, comprising the City Hall, library and theatre, among others
- The Mannerheim Park
- The Southern Ostrobothnia District Museum
- The Civil Guard and Lotta Svärd Museum, located at the Seinäjoki Civil Guard House
- Törnävä church
- The railway exhibition
- Mallaskoski brewery

=== Other points of interest ===
- Törnävä Museum Area
- the Suviyö trotting-race
- Törnävä summer theatre – Seinäjoki
- Jouppi mountain winter sports centre
- Seinäjoki City Theatre
- Provinssirock
- Tangomarkkinat
- Vauhtiajot
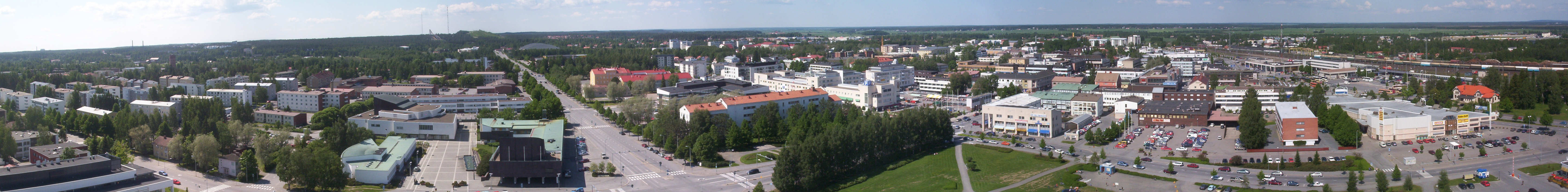
Panorama image of Seinäjoki

== Education ==
Seinäjoki University of Applied Sciences (SeAMK) is the local higher education institution, that also pursues an international profile.

== Notable people ==
- Jukka Hildén, stuntman, The Dudesons
- Antti Isotalo, jäger, tribal warrior, Alko's local leader
- Katja Kankaanpää, mixed martial artist
- Mari Kiviniemi, politician (Prime Minister of Finland 2010–2011)
- Paula Koivuniemi, singer
- Petri Kontiola, hockey player
- Pekka Koskela, speed skater
- Jarno Laasala, stuntman, The Dudesons
- Hannu Lahtinen, world wrestling champion
- Veli Lampi, soccer player
- Jarppi Leppälä, stuntman, The Dudesons
- Tapio Luoma, Archbishop
- Jorma Ollila, former chairman and CEO of the Nokia Corporation
- Hannu-Pekka "HP" Parviainen, snowboarder, stuntman, The Dudesons
- Pekka Puska, public health researcher and official
- Paula Risikko, Member of Parliament and Minister
- Arto Saari, skateboarder
- Softengine, rock pop band

== International relations ==
=== Twin towns — Sister cities ===
Seinäjoki is twinned with:

- Koszalin, Poland
- Schweinfurt, Germany
- Sopron, Hungary
- Melitopol, Ukraine
- Jiangjin District, China

== See also ==
- Ilmajoki
- Isokyrö
- Lapua
- Peräseinäjoki
- Vaasa

== Sources ==
=== Literatures ===
- Reino Ala-Kulju (1963). Seinäjoen kirja (in Finnish). Seinäjoen seurakunta.
- Aulis J. Alanen (1970). Seinäjoen historia I (in Finnish). Seinäjoen kaupunki.
- Annikki Kyttä & Tenho Takalo (1977). Seinäjoen historia II (in Finnish). Seinäjoen kaupunki. ISBN 951-99131-5-7.
