= Seinäjoki City Hall =

City hall in Finland

- Seinäjoen kaupungintalo
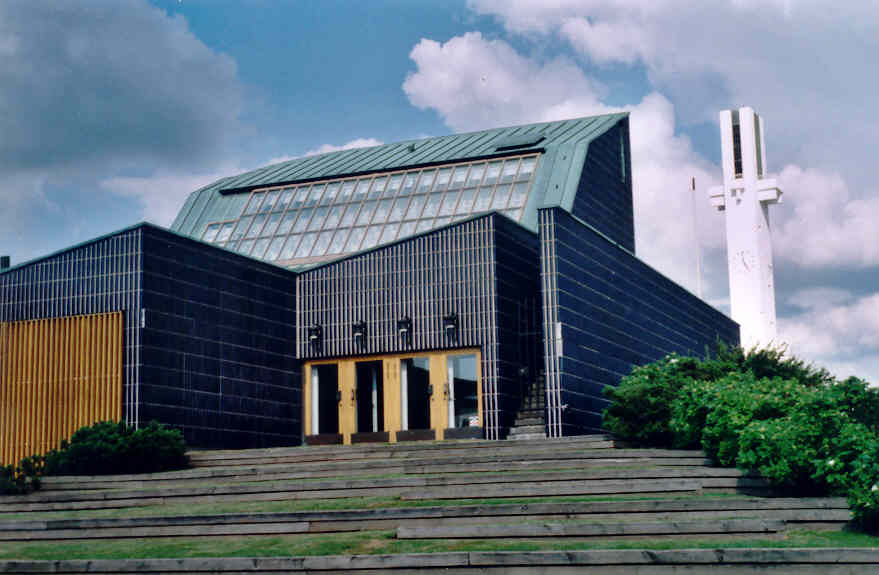
- Seinäjoki City Hall, with the belfry of the Lakeuden Risti Church in the background
- Interactive map of the Seinäjoki City Hall area

General information
- Architectural style: Modernism
- Location: Seinäjoki, Finland
- Coordinates: 62.786564°N 22.841781°E
- Completed: 1962

Design and construction
- Architect: Alvar Aalto

Website
- www.seinajoki.fi/en/

The Seinäjoki City Hall is the main municipal administrative building in the city of Seinäjoki, Finland. It is notable for having been designed by the renowned Finnish architect Alvar Aalto.

== Architecture ==
The building is based on Aalto's 1959 winning entry into a design contest for the new Seinäjoki urban plan, and was completed three years later in 1962. It was comprehensively renovated in the 2010s, with the work finished in 2018.

The exterior cladding of the main facade features dark blue ceramic tiles which appear to change colour under different lighting conditions.

The city council assembly hall was designed to serve a dual purpose as a concert venue.

The City Hall forms part of the city's so-called Aalto Centre (Finnish: Aalto-keskus), a cluster of Aalto-designed public buildings and an integral central square, which has been recognised by the Finnish Heritage Agency as a nationally important built cultural environment (Valtakunnallisesti merkittävä rakennettu kulttuuriympäristö).

== See also ==
- Aalto Centre, Seinäjoki
- Rovaniemi city hall
