= Aalto Centre, Seinäjoki =

Administrative and cultural center in Seinäjoki, Finland

Coordinates: 62°47′10″N 22°50′30″E

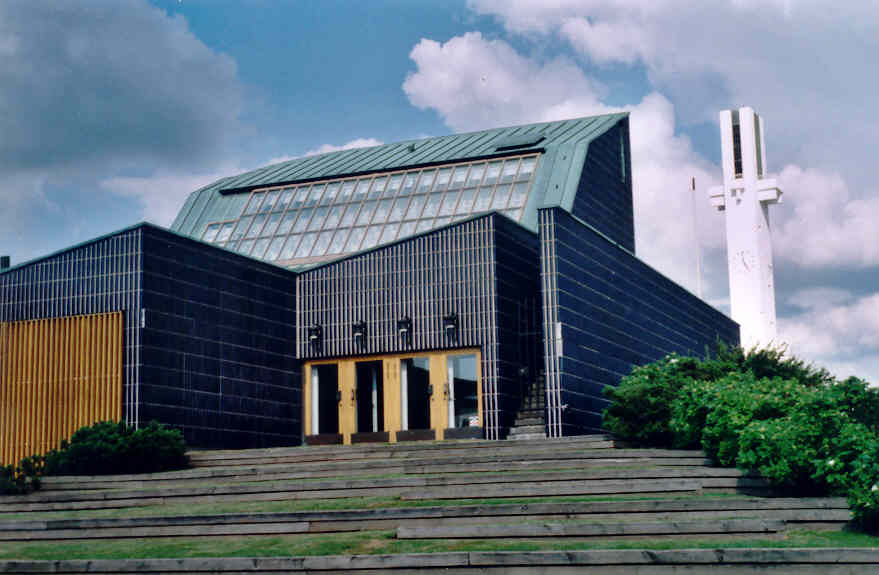
- Seinäjoki Town Hall, with the bell tower of the Lakeuden Risti Church visible in the background

General information
- Location: Seinäjoki, Finland

UNESCO World Heritage Site
- Official name: Aalto Centre, Seinäjoki
- Part of: Aalto Works
- Criteria: Cultural: ii
- Reference: 1752
- Inscription: 2026 (48th Session)

Aalto Center (Finnish: Aaltokeskus) is the administrative and cultural center of the City of Seinäjoki, Finland. It comprises six buildings, designed by Alvar Aalto and mainly completed between 1960 and 1968. The center represents one of Aalto's most important works and is notable in Finland and even internationally as an architectural whole. The wooden plan of the center is in the collections of the Museum of Modern Art in New York.

== History ==
An architectural competition was organized in 1951 for the design of Seinäjoki's new church. Aalto's entry, named "Cross Of The Plains", won the competition, even though it exceeded the area set in the competition rules. It took several years before construction started; the church was eventually built between 1957 and 1960.

In 1958, as the church was being built, the town of Seinäjoki organized another architectural competition for the design of a new town hall for a site next to the church. Alvar Aalto and his wife, Elissa Aalto, won the follow-up competition in 1959, which also included plans for a library, a theatre, and a state office building. The town hall was constructed in 1961–1962 and the library in 1964–1965. A parish center, also designed by Aalto, was built next to the church in 1965–1966. The state office building hosting various civil service departments was constructed in 1967–1968.

The plans for the theatre were finished by Aalto in 1969, but the building was only realized almost two decades later in 1986–1987 and under the guidance of Elissa Aalto, as Alvar Aalto had died in 1976.

Aalto also designed the courtyard between the buildings, including a fountain and the outdoor lighting. This "citizens' square" was covered with granite slabs in 1988 according to Aalto's original plans.

The National Board of Antiquities has listed the center as a nationally significant built heritage site. Docomomo has also selected it as a significant example of modern architecture in Finland. The church was protected in 2003 by a degree from the Evangelical Lutheran Church of Finland central administration, and the whole center was protected in 2005 by the Ministry of the Environment.

In July 2026, the Aalto Center, along with 12 other Aalto Works, was designated by UNESCO as a World Heritage Site.

== Buildings ==
The center consists of six buildings:

- Lakeuden Risti Church (1960)
- City Hall (1962)
- Municipal–Provincial Library (1965)
- Parish Center (1966)
- City and State Office Building (1968)
- City Theatre (1987)
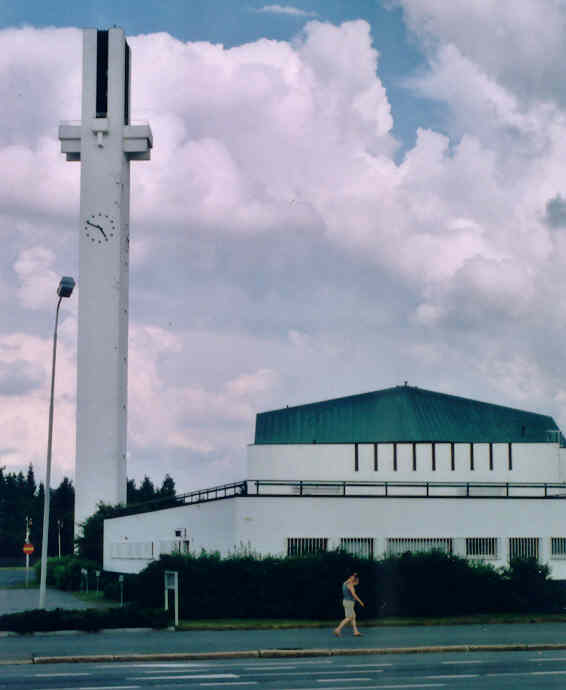
Lakeuden Risti church

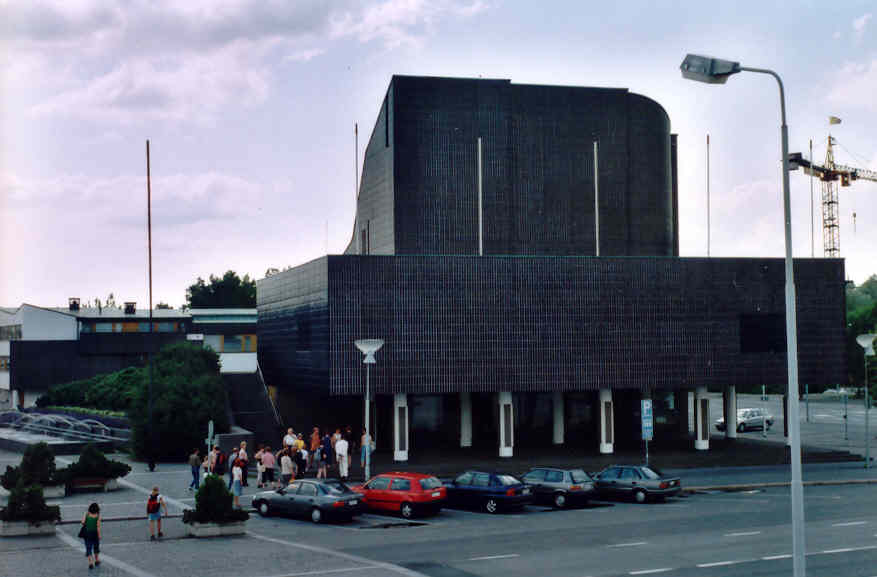
Town Hall

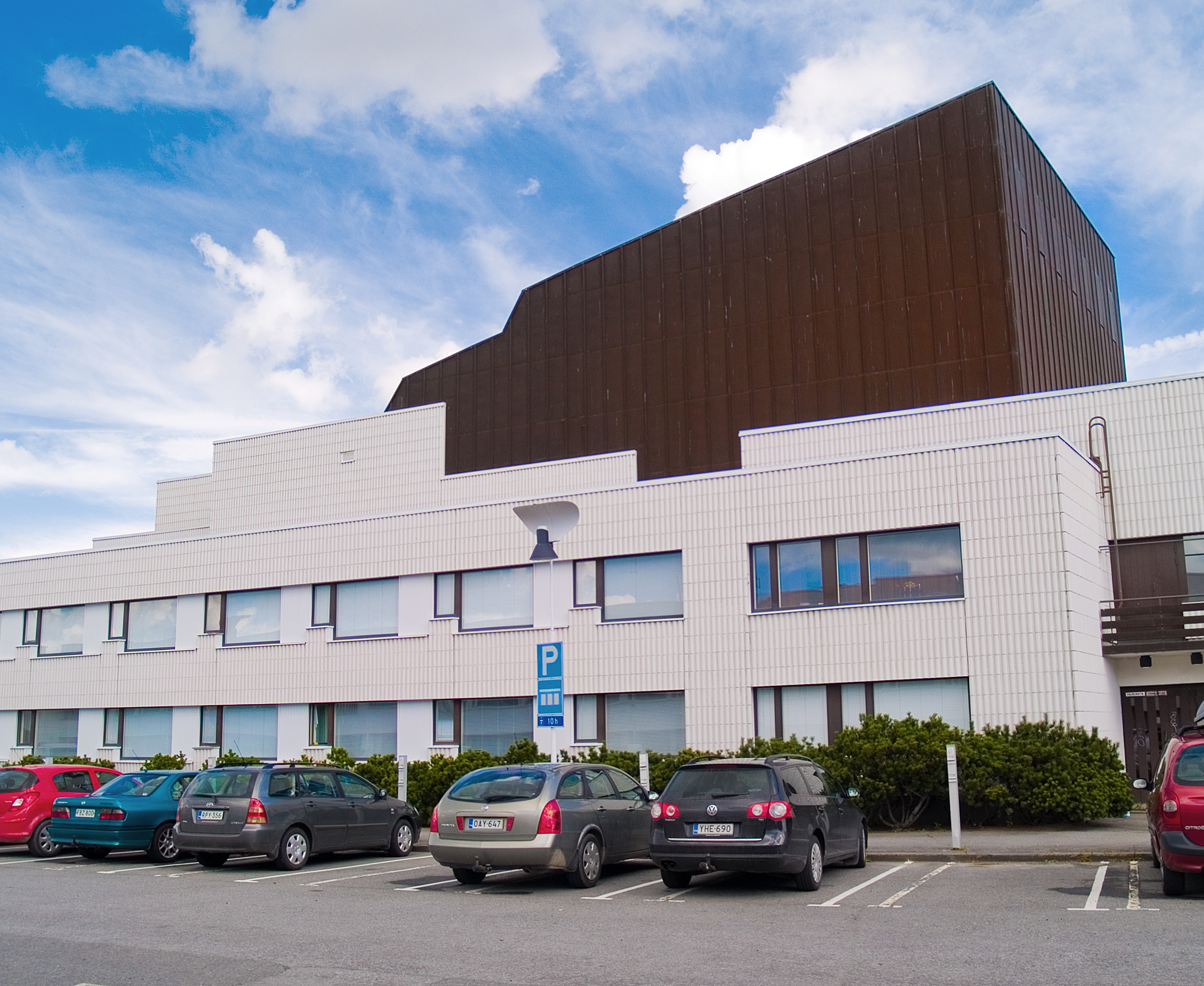
City Theatre

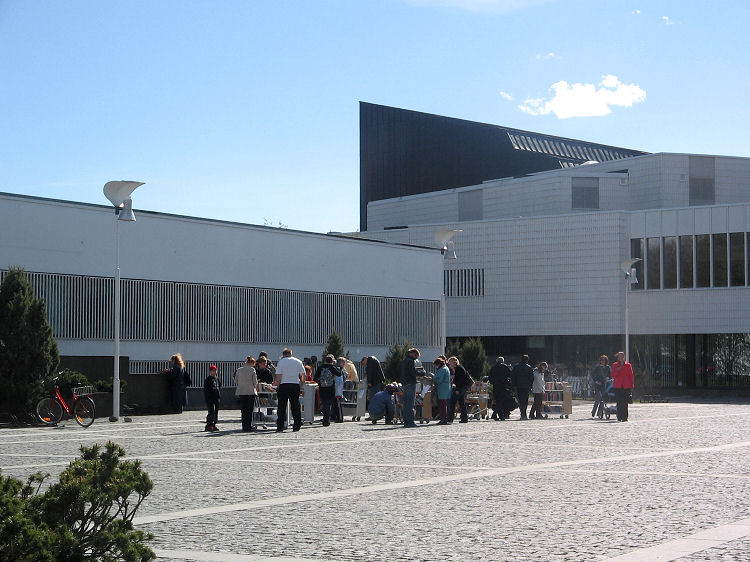
Citizens' Square

== See also ==
- Alajärvi administrative centre
- Aalto Centre, Rovaniemi
