= Mannerheim Park, Oulu =

Park in Oulu, Finland

Coordinates: 65°00′34″N 025°28′05″E

The Mannerheim Park is a small urban park in Vanhatulli district of Oulu, Finland. Renovations finished in 2019 changed the look of the park completely, and made it more suitable for small events. The park is a favorite hangout for many. The park is adjacent to the Kela building, and features a grill kiosk and a children's play area with rides and swings.

The park was named after Marshal Mannerheim, the commander-in-chief of Finnish defense forces, in honour of his 75th birthday in 1942.

== Gallery ==
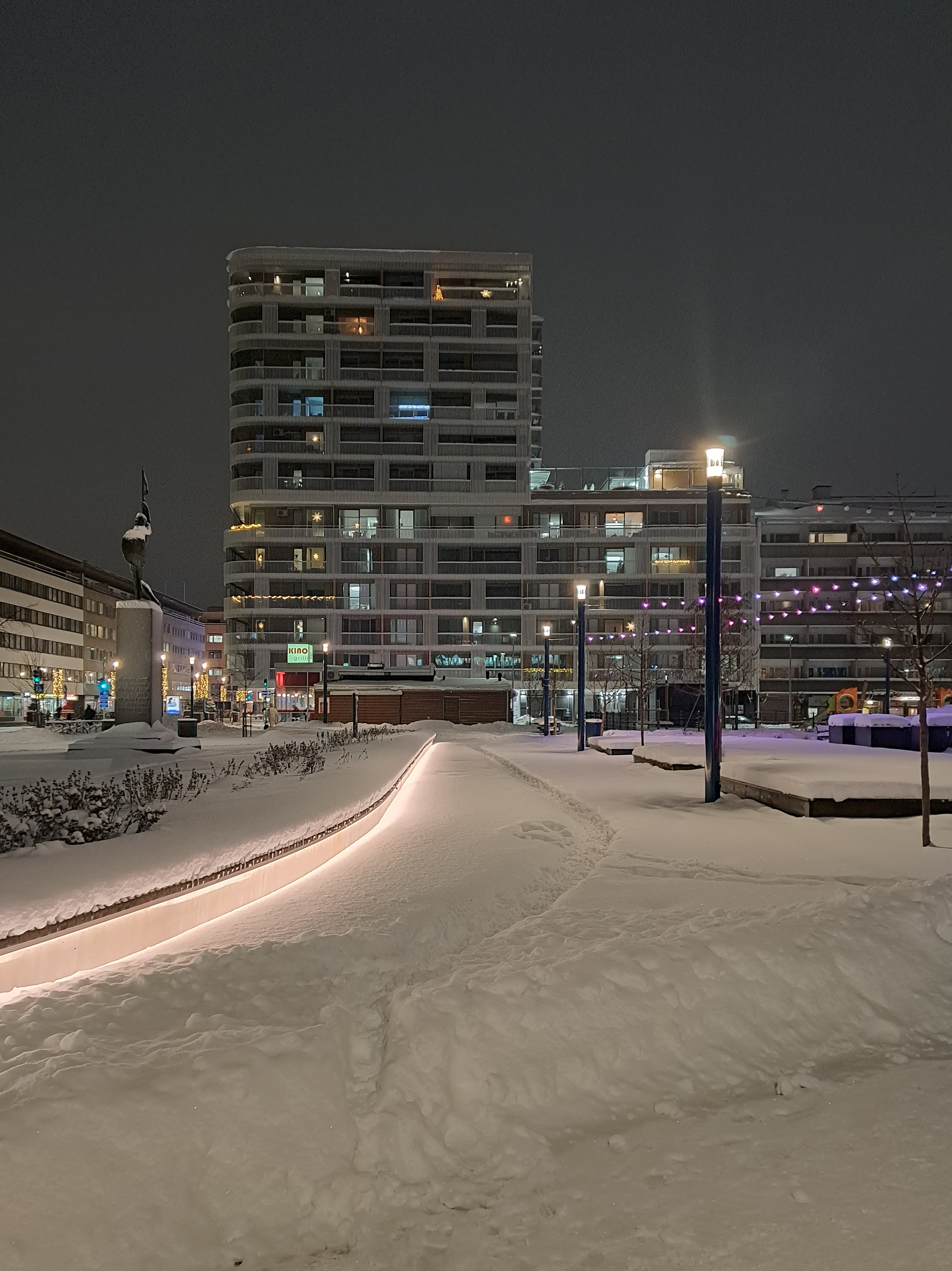
Residential building Marskinpuisto photographed from Mannerheim Park.

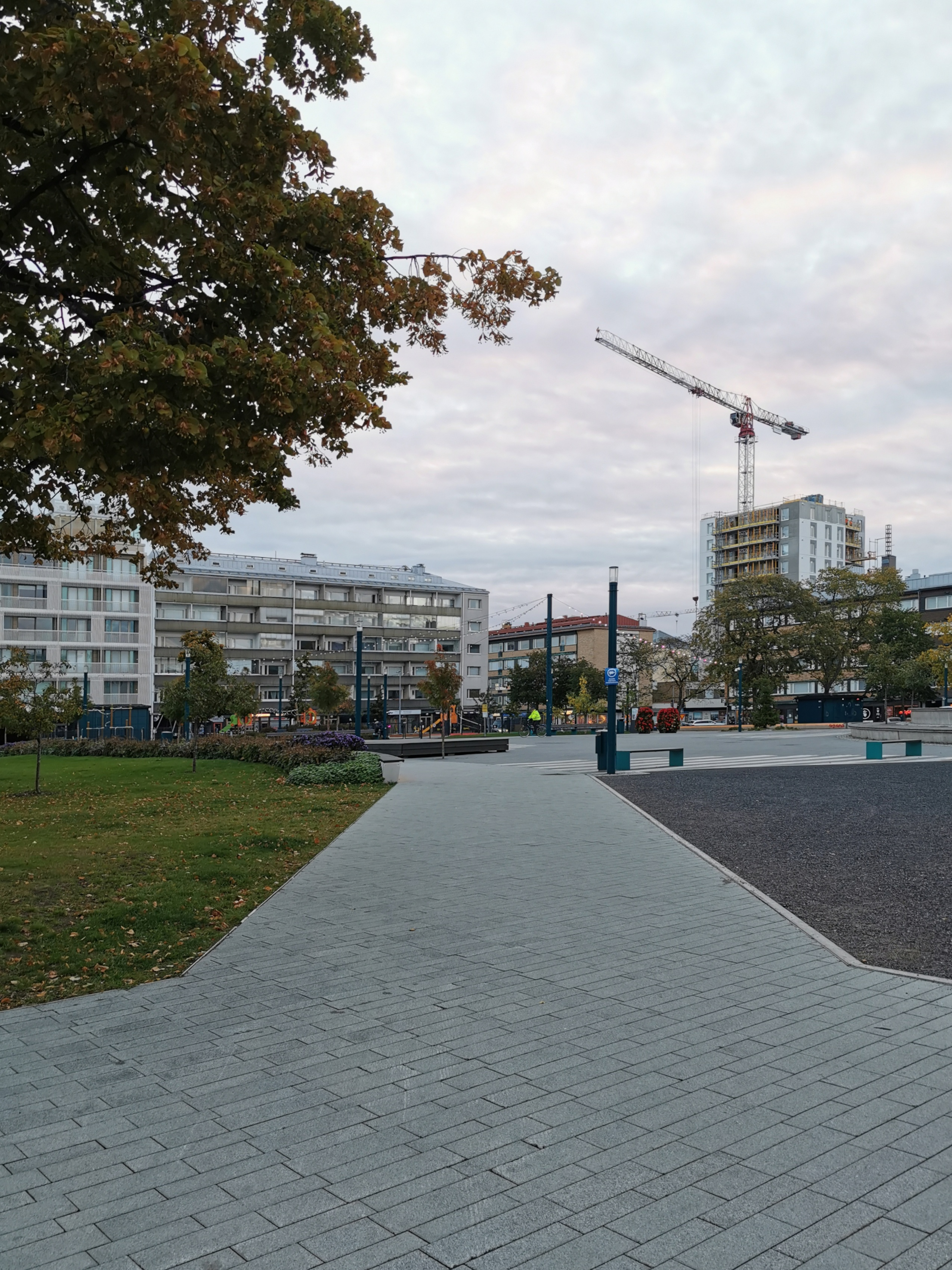
View from Kirkkokatu to east.

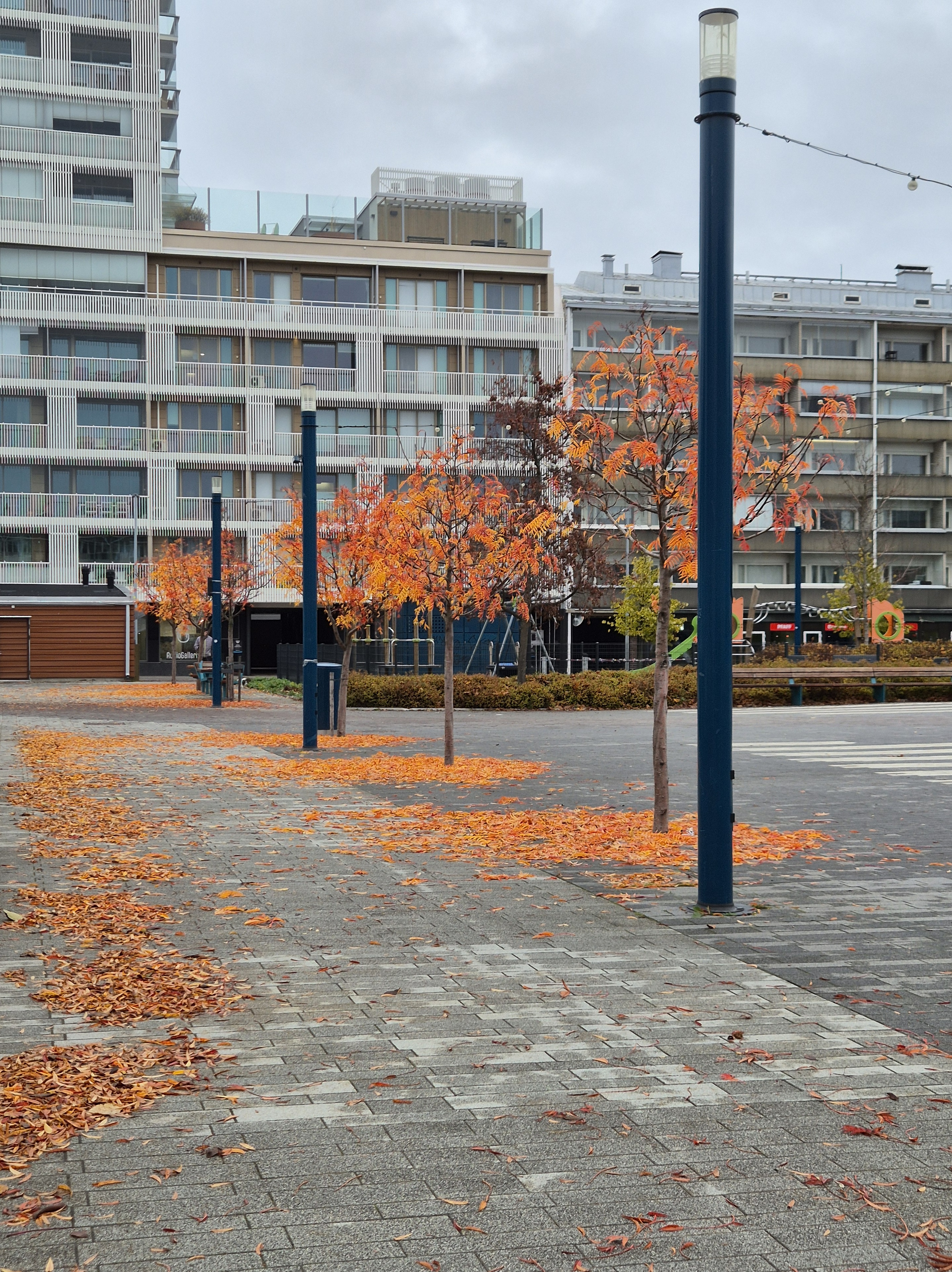
Mannerheim Park in November 2025.

== See also ==
- Mannerheim Park, Seinäjoki
