= Lakeuden Risti Church =

Church building in Seinäjoki, Finland

Coordinates: 62°47′11″N 22°50′40″E

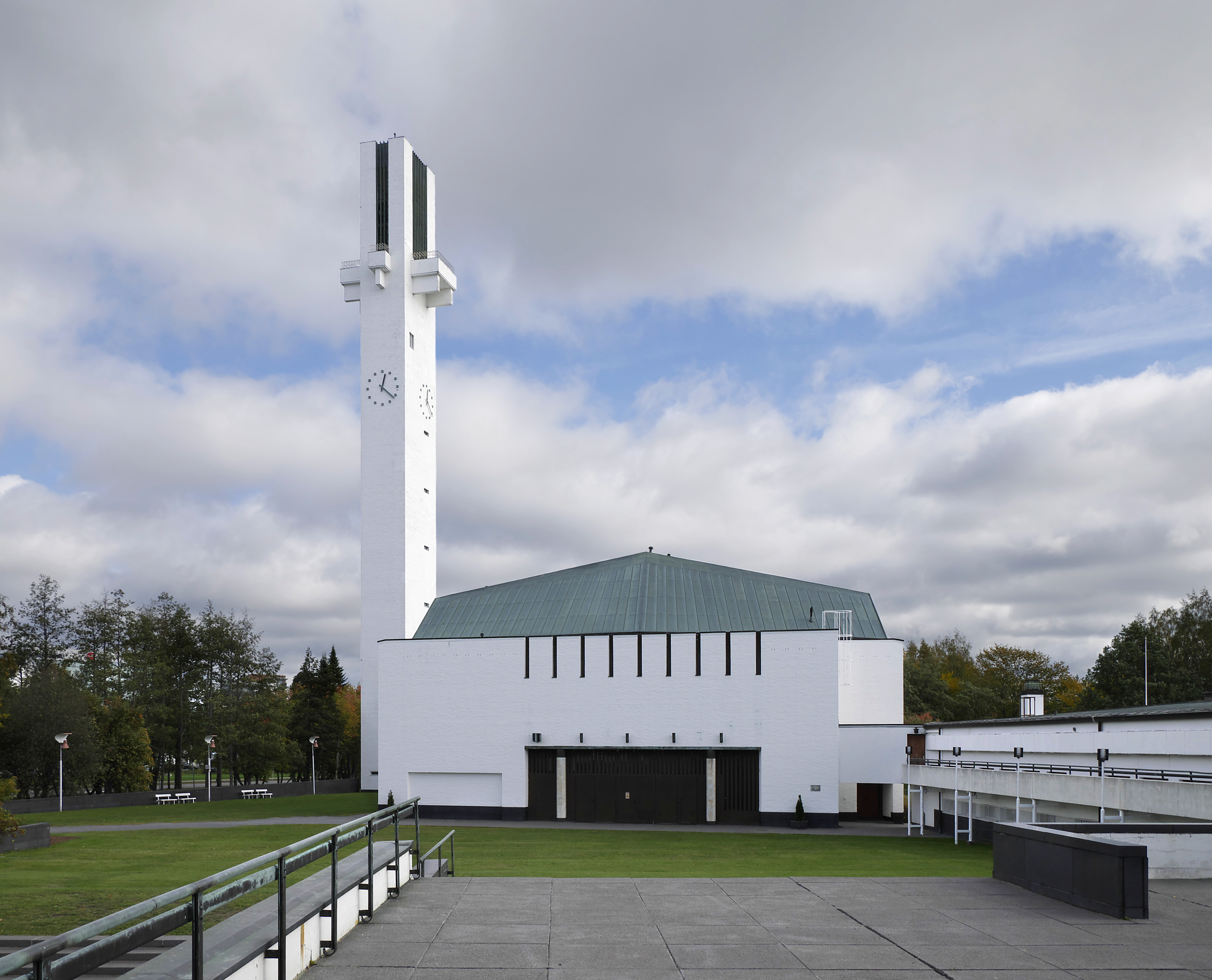
Lakeuden Risti church and bell tower

Lakeuden Risti Church (Finnish: Lakeuden Ristin kirkko; lit. "Cross of the Plains Church" (Note: 'Plains' here refers to the characteristic lowland expanses of the Ostrobothnia region where the church is located)) is a Lutheran church located in Seinäjoki, Finland. The church was designed by Alvar Aalto and built between 1957–1960. It was the first finished building of the larger administrative and civic center also planned by Aalto, consisting of Seinäjoki town hall, a library, a theater and a state office building.

== Architecture ==
The cathedral-like building seats 1200 people in the hall and 124 in the organ gallery. In the Gesamtkunstwerk spirit Aalto also designed silverware, antependiums, altar cloths and two stained glass paintings for the church.

The cross-shaped bell tower from which the church gets its name is 65 meters high and a local landmark. A parish center by Aalto, consisting of white one-storey and two-storey buildings, was built next to the church in 1964–66. Aalto also planned the surrounding park.

The Finnish Heritage Agency has listed the church as a nationally significant built heritage site as part of Aalto's administrative and civic center. Docomomo has also selected the center as a significant example of modern architecture in Finland. The church was protected in 2003 by a degree from the Evangelical Lutheran Church of Finland central administration.

== Gallery ==
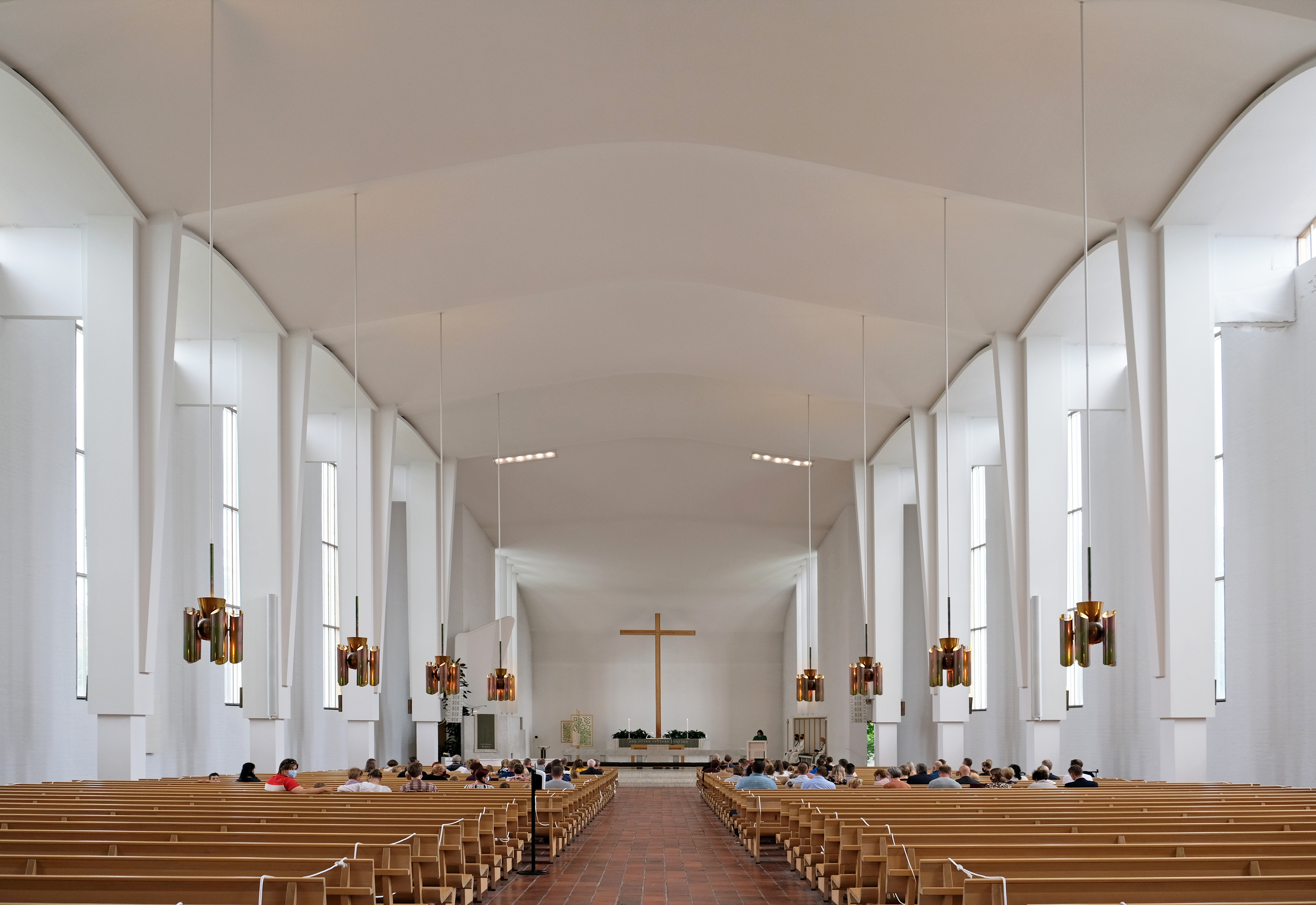
Nave, facing altar

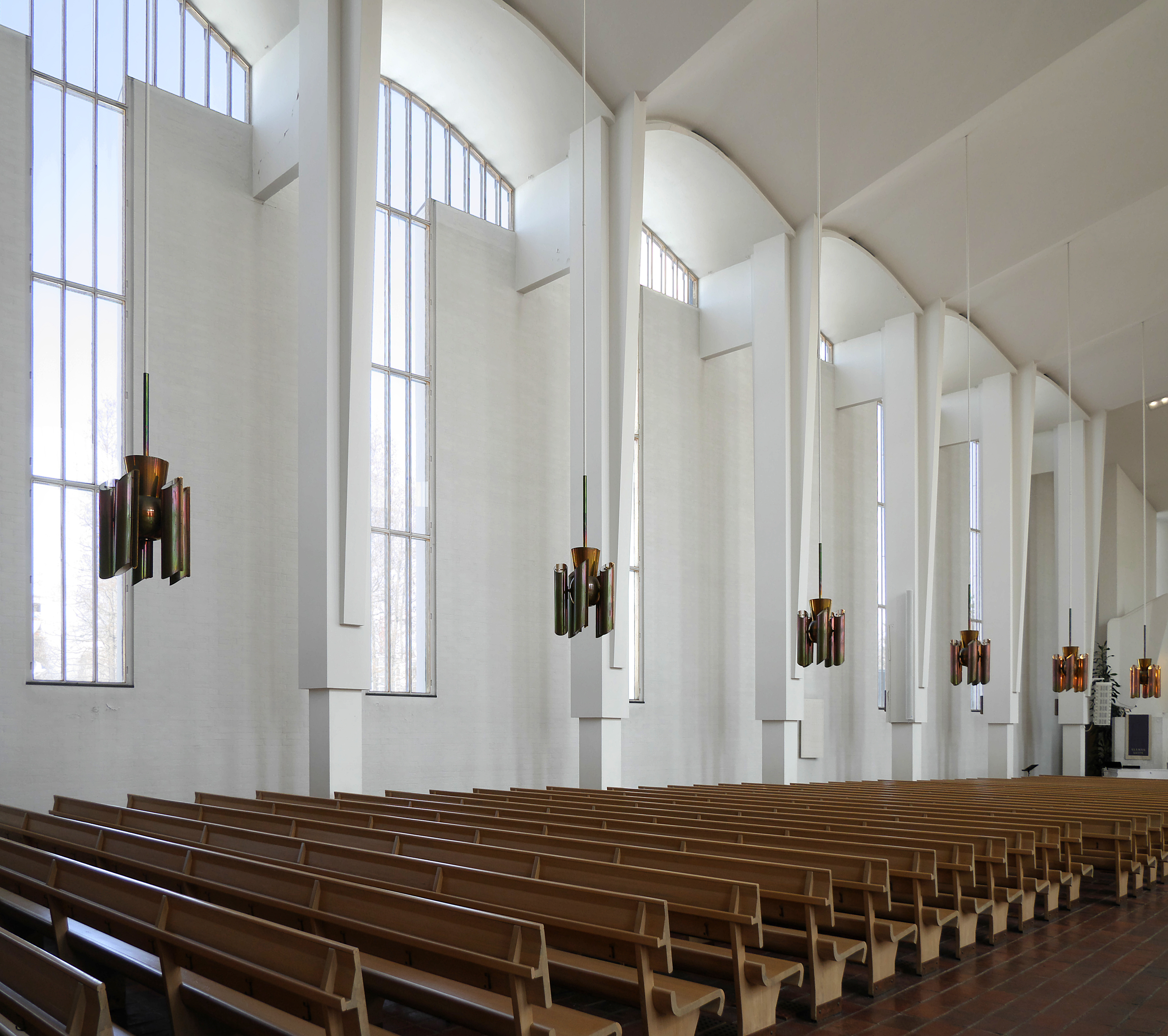
Interior aspect

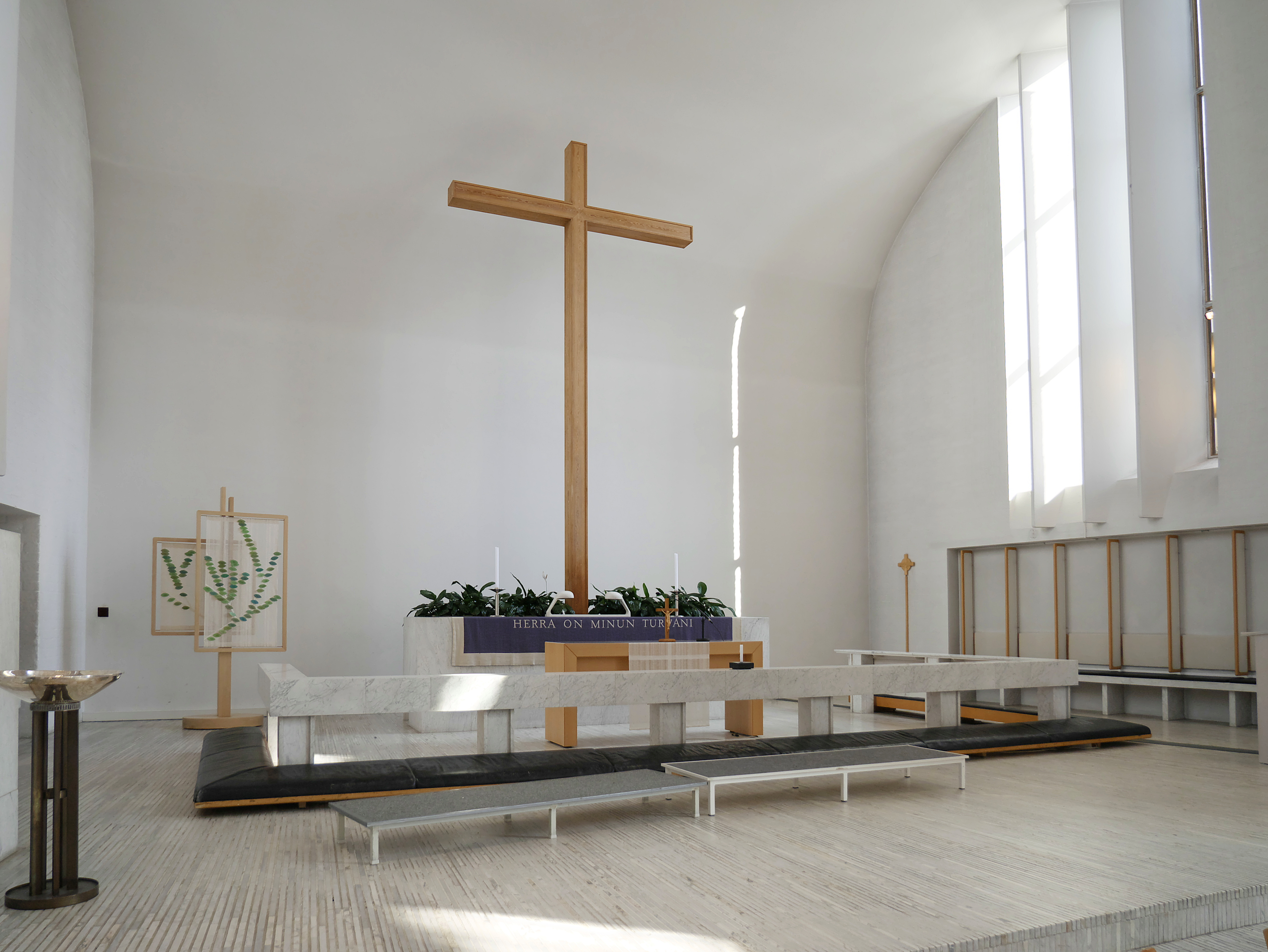
Altar

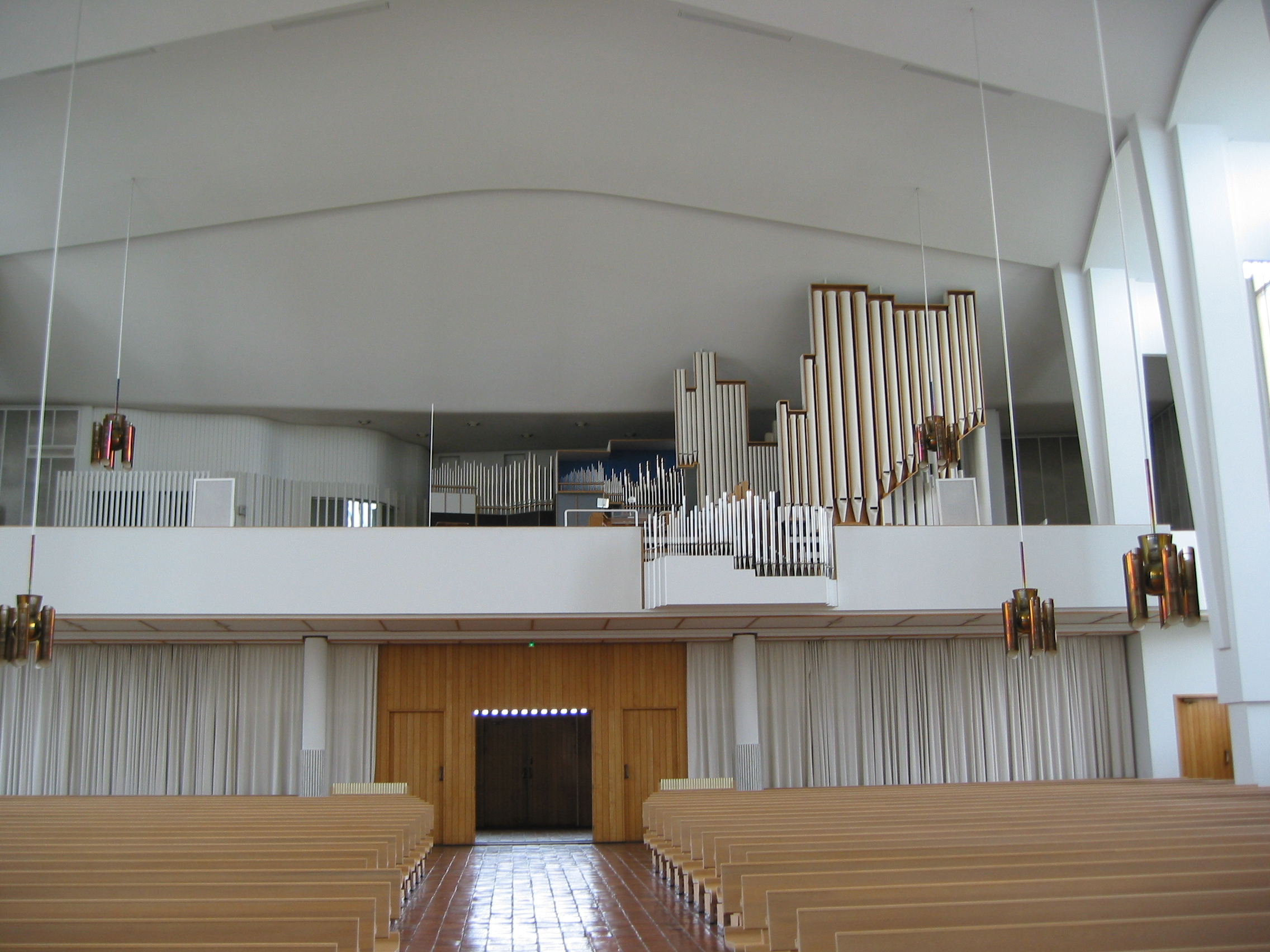
Organ gallery

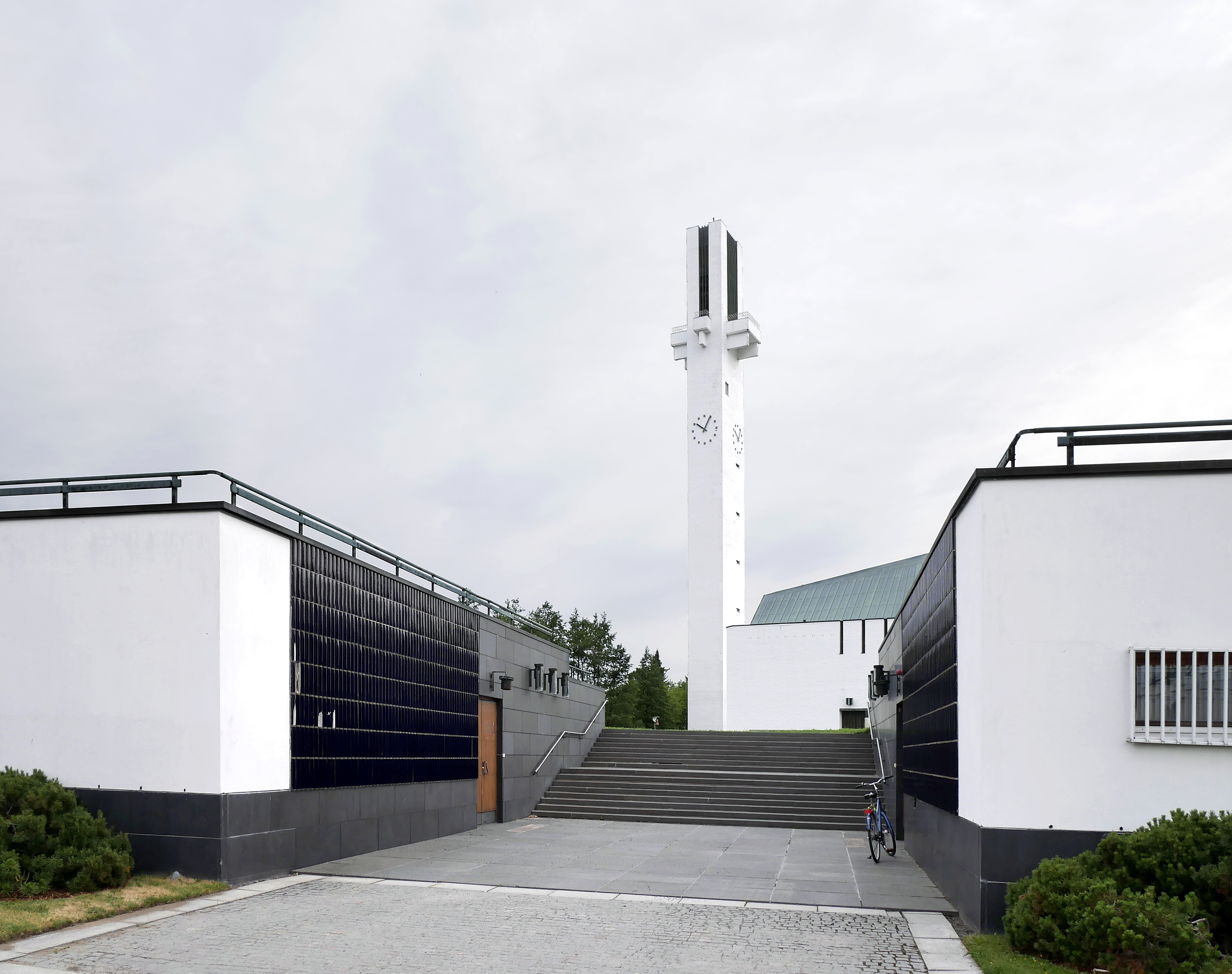
Exterior aspect

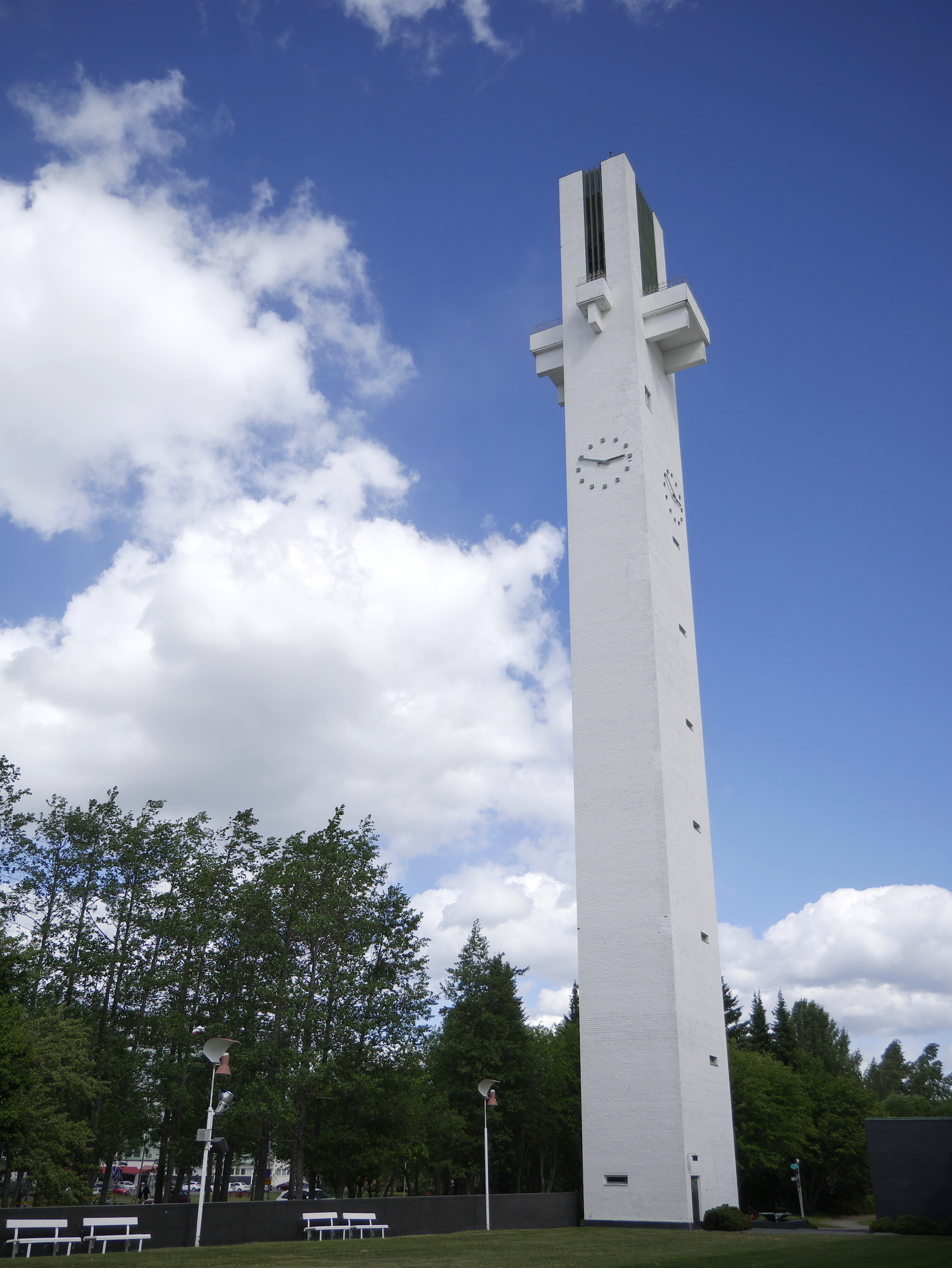
Bell tower

== See also ==
- Aalto Center
- Church of the Three Crosses, another church designed by Aalto in the 1950s
- Ristinkirkko, Lahti, another Aalto church, often said to be reminiscent of Lakeuden Risti
