= Torikeskus (Seinäjoki shopping centre) =

Torikeskus shopping centre
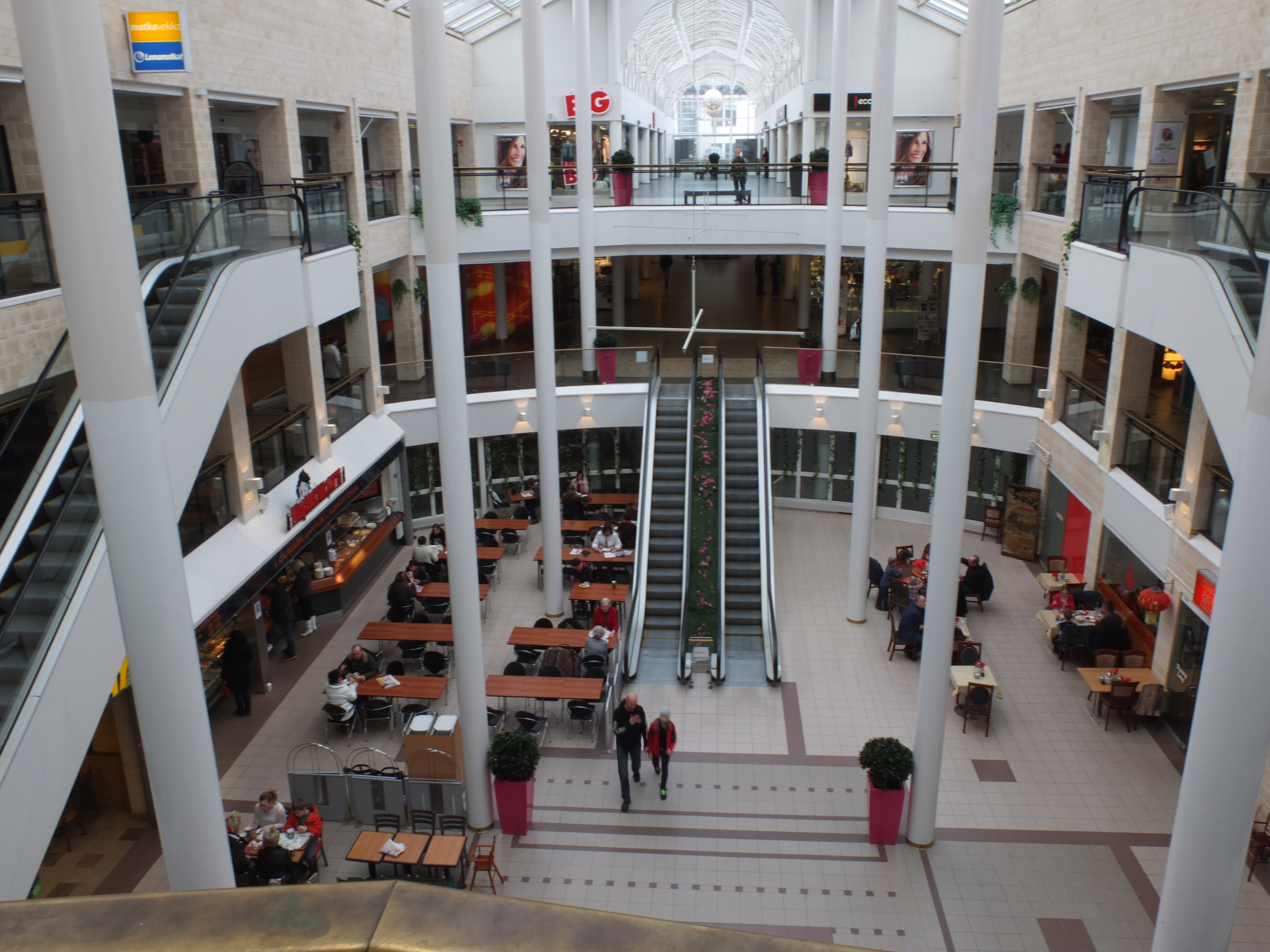
- Location: Seinäjoki, Finland
- Coordinates: 62°47′N 22°51′E
- Address: Kauppatori 1–3
- Opened: 1992
- Num. of stores: over 30
- Floor area: 11,000 m²
- Floors: 3
- Parking: 328
- Website: www.torikeskus.com

Torikeskus (Finnish pronunciation: [ˈtoriˌkeskus]; lit. "Market Center") is a shopping mall located in the center of Seinäjoki, Finland and it's the largest commercial centre in the South Ostrobothnia region. It was established in 1992 and renewed in 2007, 2009 and 2011–12. Torikeskus was previously owned by Citycon, which sold it in late 2013 to a local investor. The name of the shopping center comes from the Market Square in front of it.

Torikeskus has about 11,000 square metres (120,000 sq ft) of leasable area, of which about 8,500 square metres (91,000 sq ft) is retail space. The center has specialty shops, restaurants and cafes, as well as the upper floors of offices in companies and agencies in various fields, which travel often takes place outside of the building through the stairwell.

In 2012, Torikeskus had about 1.3 million visitors and sales of EUR 17.8 million. In connection with the market center, there is a 328-space parking garage.

Torikeskus has more than 30 shops and services. In 2013, 53% of the stores were clothing stores (including H&M and Lindex), 20% were cafes and restaurants (including Hesburger and Subway) and 14.4% were interior design and household goods stores. Of the facilities, 2.4% were beauty and health stores (including The Body Shop) and 2% were leisure stores. The remaining 8.3% were other commercial services.

The office space in Torikeskus is 3,500 square metres (38,000 sq ft). The premises include If P&C Insurance and Peab.
