= Finnish Heritage Agency =

Agency to preserve Finland's material cultural heritage

The Finnish Heritage Agency
- Museovirasto (Finnish); Museiverket (Swedish)

Agency overview
- Formed: 1972
- Headquarters: Sturenkatu 2a, Helsinki
- Employees: 235
- Agency executive: Tiina Merisalo, Director-general
- Parent department: Ministry of Education and Culture
- Website: www.museovirasto.fi

Footnotes
- Until 2018, The National Board of Antiquities.

The Finnish Heritage Agency (Finnish: Museovirasto, Swedish: Museiverket), previously known in English as the National Board of Antiquities, preserves Finland's material cultural heritage: collects, studies and distributes knowledge of it. The agency is a cultural and research institution, but it is also a government authority charged with the protection of archaeological sites, built heritage, cultural-historically valuable environments and cultural property, in collaboration with other officials and museums.

The Agency offers a wide range and diversified range of services, a professional staff of specialists, the exhibitions and collections of its several museums, extensive archives, and a specialized scientific library, all of which are at the disposal of the general public.

The Finnish Heritage Agency is attached to the Ministry of Education.
