= Wolfsburg =

City in Lower Saxony, German

Wolfsburg Wulfsborg (Eastphalian)
- City
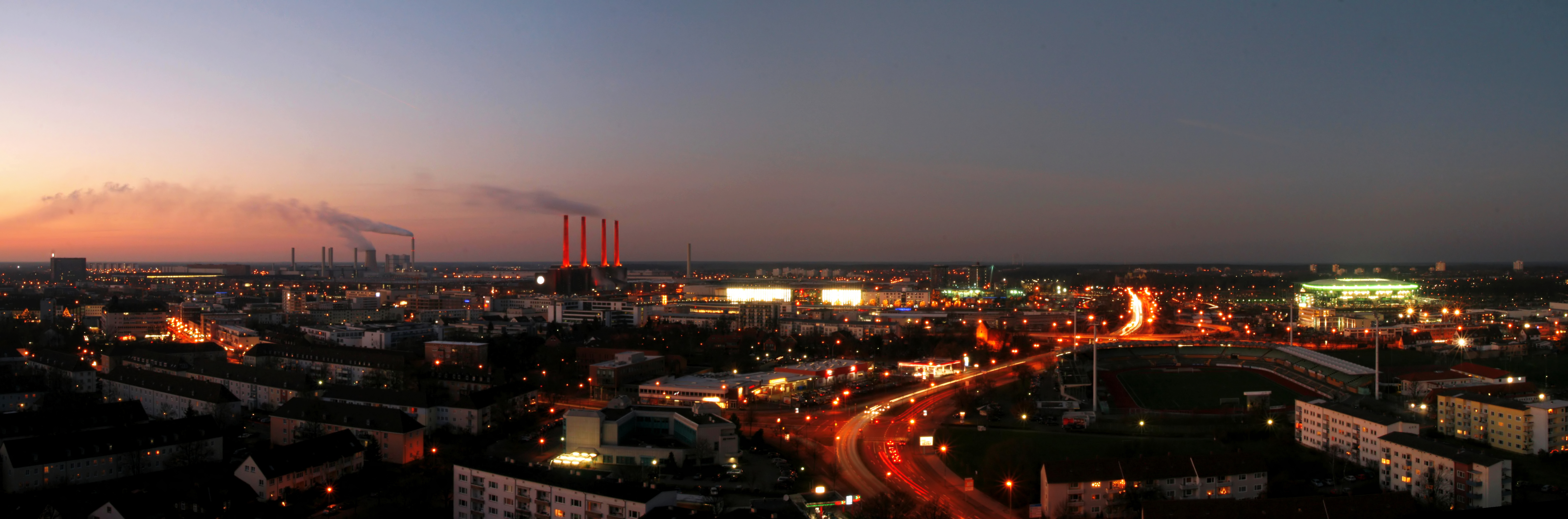
- Skyline of Wolfsburg at dusk

- Flag Coat of arms

- Location of Wolfsburg in Lower Saxony
- Interactive map of Wolfsburg
- Location within Germany Location within Lower Saxony
- Coordinates: 52°25′23″N 10°47′14″E
- Country: Germany
- State: Lower Saxony
- District: Urban district
- Subdivisions: 16 Ortschaften, 40 Stadtteile

Government
  - Mayor (2021–26): Dennis Weilmann (CDU)

Area
  - Total: 204.02 km^{2} (78.77 sq mi)
- Elevation: 63 m (207 ft)

Population (2025-12-31)
  - Total: 129,813
  - Density: 636.28/km^{2} (1,647.9/sq mi)
- Time zone: UTC+01:00 (CET)
  - Summer (DST): UTC+02:00 (CEST)
- Postal codes: 38400–38448
- Dialling codes: 05361, 05362, 05363, 05365, 05366, 05367, 05308
- Vehicle registration: WOB
- Website: www.Wolfsburg.de

Wolfsburg (German: [ˈvɔlfsbʊʁk]; Eastphalian: Wulfsborg) is the fifth-largest city in the German state of Lower Saxony. It lies on the river Aller, 75 kilometres (47 mi) east of Hanover and 230 kilometres (143 mi) west of Berlin.

Wolfsburg is famous as the location of Volkswagen AG's headquarters and, until it was overtaken by Tesla Gigafactory Texas in 2022, the world's biggest car plant. The Autostadt is a visitor attraction next to the Volkswagen factory that features the company's model range: Audi, Bentley, Ducati, Lamborghini, Porsche, SEAT, Škoda Auto and Volkswagen Commercial Vehicles. Wolfsburg is one of the few German cities built during the first half of the 20th century as a planned city. From its founding on 1 July 1938 as a home for workers producing the KdF-Wagen until 25 May 1945, the city was called Stadt des KdF-Wagens bei Fallersleben. In 1972, the population first exceeded 100,000. In 2019, the GRP was €188,453 per capita.

== History ==
The Wolfsburg Castle was first mentioned in 1302 in a document as the domicile of the noble lineage of Bartensleben. Originally a keep next to the Aller, it was protected by a moat some centuries later. In 1372, the first documentary reference to the Burg Neuhaus ('castle of Neuhaus') near Wolfsburg appeared. After the extinction of the Bartensleben line in 1742, the property and its Schloss Wolfsburg ('Wolfsburg castle') passed on to the Counts of Schulenburg. The communal manor was an important employer for the nearby settlements Rothenfelde and Heßlingen.

Some of today's urban districts, including Vorsfelde and the villages transferred to Wolfsburg from the county of Helmstedt, belonged to the Principality of Brunswick-Wolfenbüttel. Fallersleben and other villages belonged to the Electorate of Braunschweig-Lüneburg, which later developed into the Kingdom of Hanover and became a Prussian province in 1866. Other urban districts, including Heßlingen, belonged to the Prussian Duchy of Magdeburg. In 1932, these districts were detached from the Prussian Province of Saxony and integrated into the Province of Hanover.

Wolfsburg was founded on 1 July 1938 as the Stadt des KdF-Wagens bei Fallersleben, ('city of the Strength Through Joy car at Fallersleben'), a planned town centred around the village of Fallersleben, built to house workers of the Volkswagen factories erected to assemble what would be later known as the Volkswagen Beetle. During World War II, military cars, aeroplanes, and other military equipment were built there, mainly by forced workers and prisoners-of-war. In 1942, German authorities established the Arbeitsdorf concentration camp in the city for a few months. At least six individuals died while working at this camp.

The city and Volkswagen factory were captured on 11 April 1945, by US troops, and about 7,700 forced labourers were liberated from the Volkswagen factory. The US troops occupied the city until the end of June, during which time the city was renamed Wolfsburg on 25 May 1945, after the eponymous castle located there. The American occupation ended at the end of June 1945 when the region became part of the British occupation zone. In 1951, Wolfsburg was separated from the District of Gifhorn, and became an urban district.

In 1955, the one-millionth VW Beetle was manufactured in Wolfsburg. Postwar Beetle production ended in Wolfsburg in 1974, though Beetle production continued within Germany at Emden until 1978. The factories in Wolfsburg remain a key part of Volkswagen's production capacity.

During the German economic miracle, Wolfsburg experienced a large influx of immigrant workers, especially from Italy.

In 1958, the city hall was built. In 1960, the Volkswagenwerk GmbH (partnership with limited liability) was changed into an AG (public limited company).

In the course of a land reform in Lower Saxony in 1972, 20 localities were added to the city through the "Wolfsburg-Act". Wolfsburg gained the status of major city with nearly 131,000 inhabitants. The city's area grew from 35 to nearly 204 km^{2} (79 sq mi). In 1973, the city's population peaked at 131,971.

In 1982, the A39, a side road of the A2 (Oberhausen - Hannover - Werder), was built as a direct freeway to Wolfsburg.

In 1988, the city became a university town with the establishment of the University of Applied Science Braunschweig/Wolfenbüttel. Today its name is Ostfalia University of Applied Sciences.

As a launch promotion for the 5th generation of the Volkswagen Golf the city of Wolfsburg welcomed visitors on the internet, on the official stationery, and on every city limit sign with the name "Golfsburg" from 25 August to 10 October 2003. This campaign gained the nationwide attention of press, radio, and TV broadcasting.

In the summer of 2009, Wolfsburg gained nationwide attention when their football team, VfL Wolfsburg, won the Bundesliga. A party was held in the city centre with about 100,000 people, the first in the history of the city.

== Geography ==
Wolfsburg is located at the Southern edge of the ancient river valley of the Aller at the Mittellandkanal (lit. 'middle land canal'). It is bordered by the districts of Gifhorn and Helmstedt.

=== Climate ===
The total annual precipitation is about 532 millimetres (21 in) which is quite low as it belongs to the lowest tenth of the measured data in Germany. Only 7% of all observation stations of the Deutscher Wetterdienst (German weather service) record lower measurements. The warmest month is July and the driest month is April, while the wettest are July and August.

Climate data for Wolfsburg (1991-2020)
| Month | Jan | Feb | Mar | Apr | May | Jun | Jul | Aug | Sep | Oct | Nov | Dec | Year |
|---|---|---|---|---|---|---|---|---|---|---|---|---|---|
| Daily mean °C (°F) | 1.7 (35.1) | 2.3 (36.1) | 5.3 (41.5) | 9.8 (49.6) | 14.0 (57.2) | 17.1 (62.8) | 19.1 (66.4) | 18.8 (65.8) | 14.6 (58.3) | 10.0 (50.0) | 5.6 (42.1) | 2.6 (36.7) | 10.1 (50.1) |
| Average precipitation mm (inches) | 50.2 (1.98) | 38.3 (1.51) | 40.7 (1.60) | 34.7 (1.37) | 50.8 (2.00) | 51.5 (2.03) | 67.0 (2.64) | 62.1 (2.44) | 49.5 (1.95) | 45.4 (1.79) | 45.0 (1.77) | 48.5 (1.91) | 583.7 (22.99) |
| Mean monthly sunshine hours | 48 | 70.6 | 120.5 | 183.7 | 217.8 | 222.4 | 223.1 | 207.7 | 154.8 | 109.1 | 49.6 | 37 | 1,644.3 |
Source: Deutscher Wetterdienst

== Culture and attractions ==
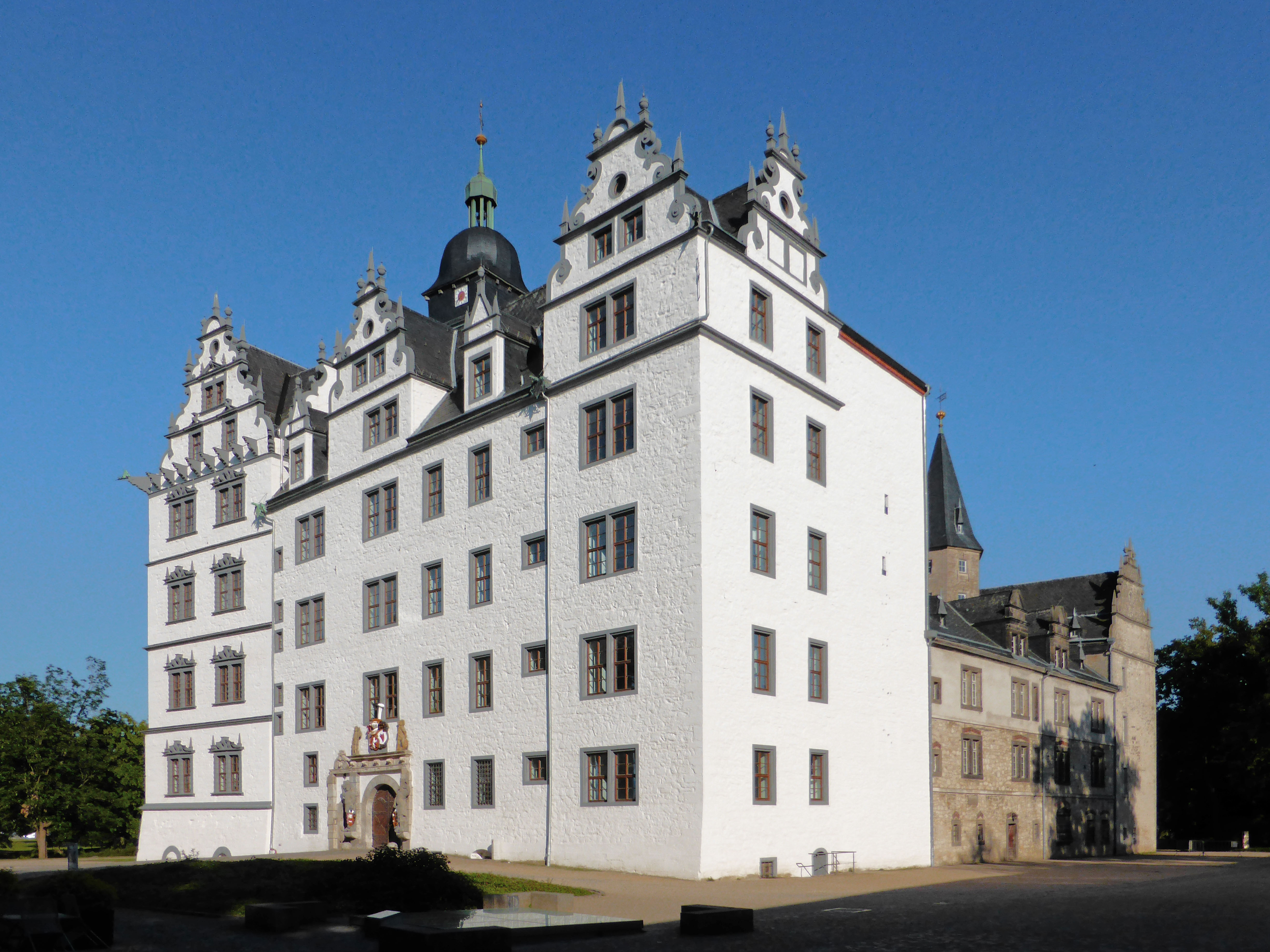
Wolfsburg Castle

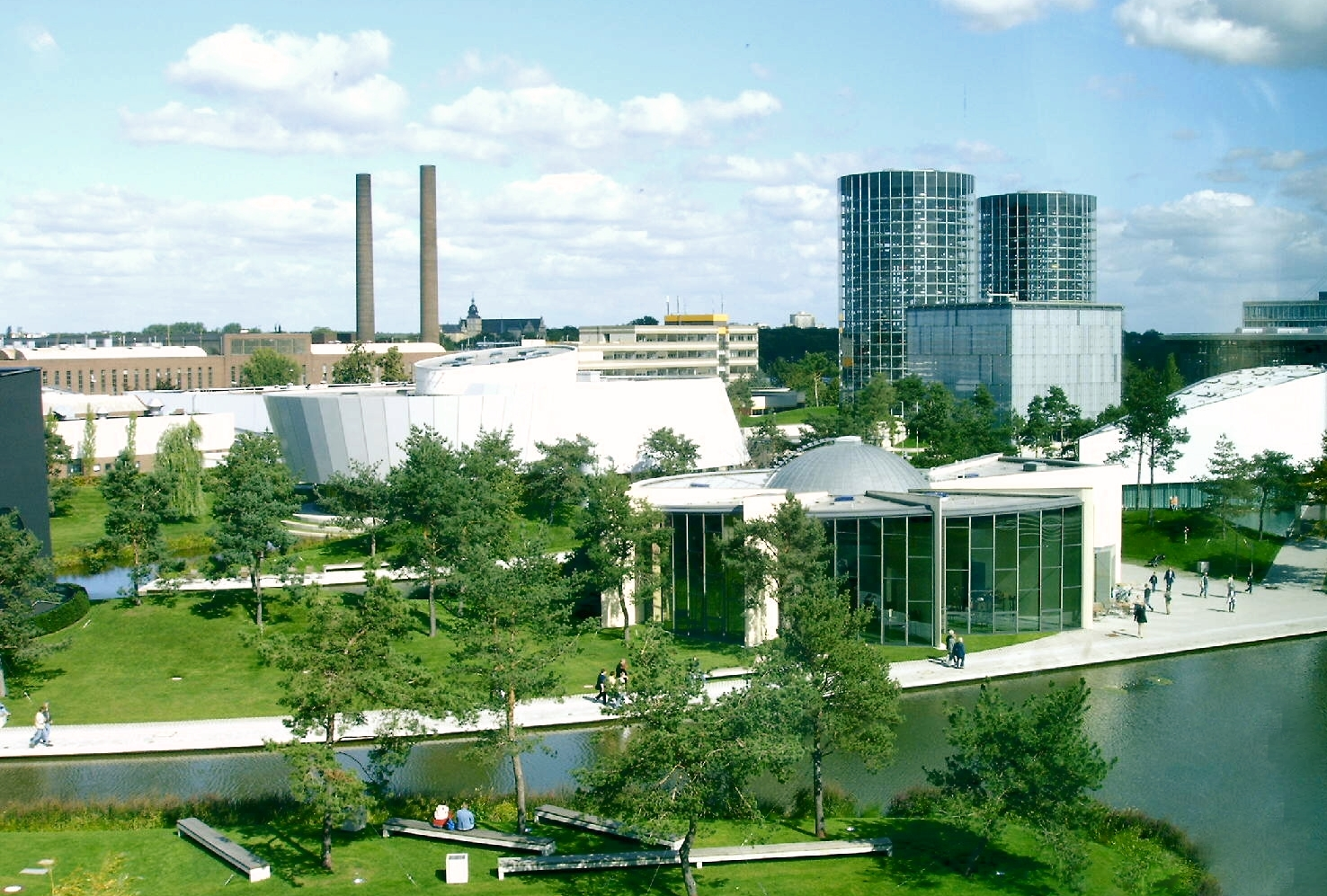
The Autostadt

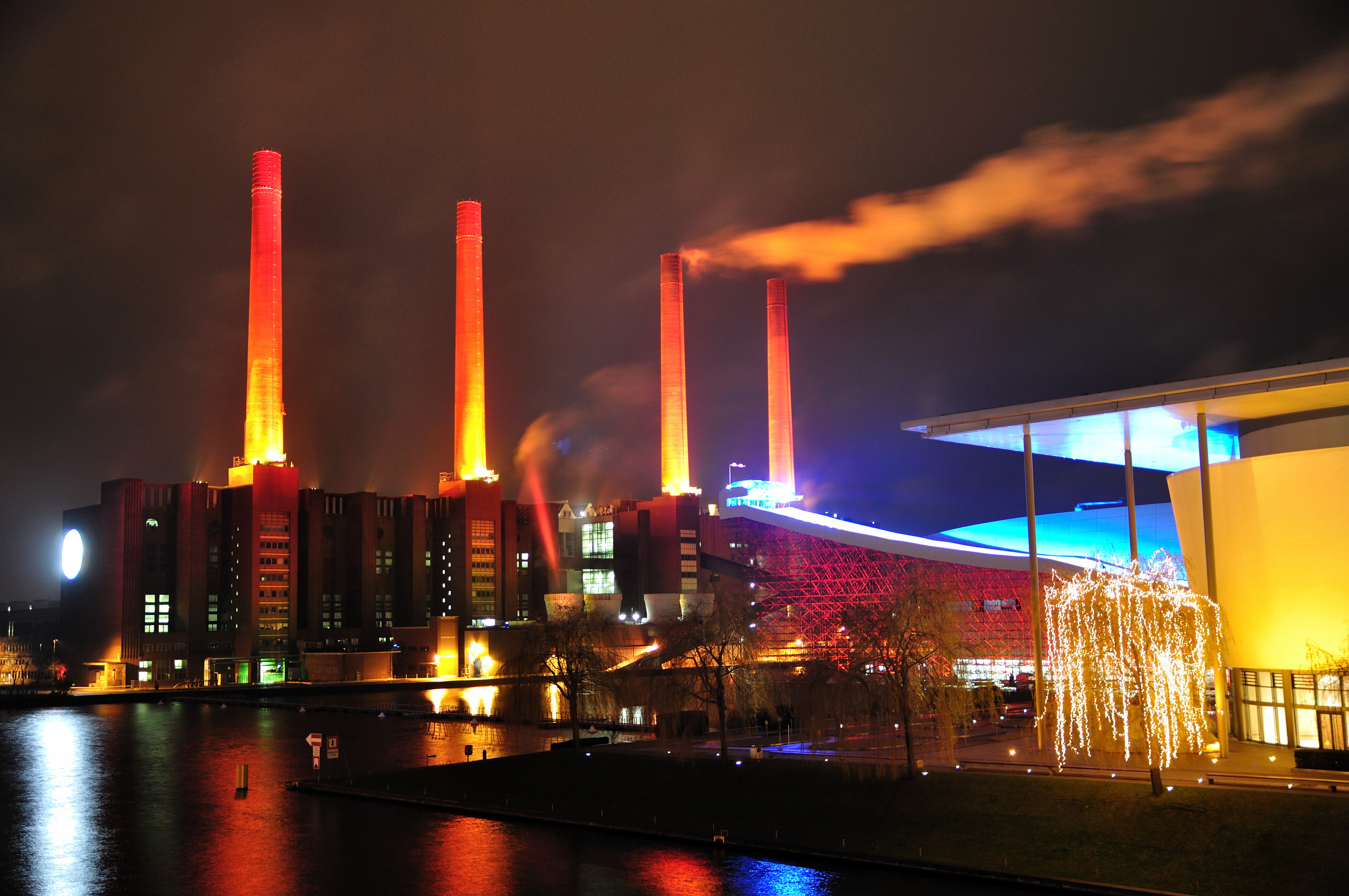
The illuminated Volkswagen power plant at night

The centre of Wolfsburg is unique in Germany. Instead of a medieval city centre, Wolfsburg features a new and modern attraction called the Autostadt. The old part of the city, Alt Wolfsburg (de), shows some manor buildings in traditional framework style. Atop a hill by the River Aller is the Wolfsburg Castle.

The Autostadt is an open-air museum-theme park dedicated to automobiles owned and operated by Volkswagen. In the center of the park are the pavilions featuring Volkswagen's major brands: Volkswagen and Audi to the north, further south are SEAT, Škoda Auto, Lamborghini, Bentley, Bugatti, and the Premium Clubhouse. Right next to the lagoon is the Porsche pavilion. The striking Volkswagen Commercial Vehicles pavilion is in the south-east of the park. The Autostadt also includes a planetarium, a Ritz-Carlton hotel, the Phaeno Science Center, the largest hands-on science museum in Germany, a water skiing resort, and a private art museum (Kunstmuseum Wolfsburg) specialising in modern and contemporary art.

Another major attraction is the Wolfsburg Water Show, the world's largest water-flame-laser-video fountain show with its up to 70-meter high fountains which has been in the Autostadt complex since 2014. The event sometimes can be seen when there are special events in the complex.

Besides the Autostadt, another well-known and distinctive attraction is BadeLand, a wellness and relaxation centre with a bathing area and various saunas.

=== Air transport ===
The city is served by Braunschweig Wolfsburg Airport. However, the airport does not operate scheduled public passenger or cargo services. The nearest passenger airport is Hannover Airport, located 90 km (56 mi) north west of Wolfsburg.

== Population ==
From about 1,000 inhabitants in 1938, the population of the city increased to 25,000 in 1950 and doubled to 50,000 by 1958. On 1 July 1972, the population of Wolfsburg first went beyond the mark of 100,000 because several adjacent suburbanized villages were incorporated into the city with the "Wolfsburg law" which made Wolfsburg a major city ("Großstadt"). In 1973, the population reached its high of 131,971. At the end of December 2010, 121,451 people were registered with their principal residence in Wolfsburg.

=== Braunschweig-Salzgitter-Wolfsburg Area ===
The three cities form a Oberzentren and a sub-metropolitan area. The area is primarily dependent on the steel, automotive and R&D industries. The population of the area was over 1 million (1,014,477) as of 2023. The three main cities have a total population of 512,600, where over half the area's population lives. 40.6% of the population has a migration background, and the city is aiming to progressively increase the foreign population in the upcoming years. The area contributes highly to the national economy, due to Volkswagen, Siemens, Salzgitter AG and other companies. The area has one of the highest GDP per capita in the whole of Europe, with Wolfsburg having the highest in the entire country, and Braunschweig having one of the highest. Though the area faced debt, mass amounts of destruction, and a population decline after World War II, the area recovered due to high demand for auto manufacturing and need for research and development.

=== Urban agglomeration ===
The urban agglomeration of Wolfsburg has 217,433 people with an area of 775 km2 and has a high proportion of people from other countries. The majority of the population in the agglomeration live in the city and in the town of Gifhorn.

== Immigration ==
Wolfsburg is cosmopolitan and recognized as a highly diverse city with people from over 150 nations residing there. By the end of 2012, this number had climbed to 123,144 and by 2030 the population is projected to be around 135,000 with around 50% of the population having a foreign background. 44.0% of Wolfsburg had a migration background in the year 2024 making it the second-highest percentage of people with a foreign background in Lower Saxony after Salzgitter.

The largest Italian community in Lower Saxony is in Wolfsburg and the city also has some of the largest Tunisian, Cameroonian and Mexican communities in Germany. The parts of the city having the highest shares are Westhagen (71.2%), Rothenfelde (64.6%), Stadtmitte (59.4%), Heßlingen (55.5%), Hohenstein (51.2%), Köhlerberg (51.2%), and Schillerteich (51.0%).

| Rank | Nationality | Population (31 December 2023) |
|---|---|---|
| 1 | Italy | 5,822 |
| 2 | Ukraine | 2,131 |
| 3 | Poland | 2,029 |
| 4 | India | 1,400 |
| 5 | Turkey | 1,001 |
| 6 | Afghanistan | 876 |
| 7 | Tunisia | 822 |
| 8 | Iran | 589 |
| 9 | Kosovo | 522 |
| 10 | Cameroon | 518 |
| 11 | China | 460 |
| 12 | Serbia | 320 |
| 13 | Mexico | 283 |
| 14 | Spain | 261 |
| 15 | Vietnam | 246 |

== Organization ==
The city of Wolfsburg is organized into 41 districts. One or more districts make up one of the total of 16 localities which are represented by their own councils. Every council has a local official as its mayor.

First the councils were only established in the 11 localities annexed in 1972. They partly took over the functions of the former city councils of each of the districts. In 1991 and 2001 some of the localities were split into smaller areas so that today there are 16 localities, each with its own council which are directly elected by the citizens.

The only exception from this organization is the Allerpark (Aller Park), a local recreation area surrounding the Allersee lake, and the area of the Volkswagen factory which are both located in the central city area.

The administrative area of Wolfsburg includes six nature reserves. Five of them are located in the ancient Aller river valley.

== Politics ==
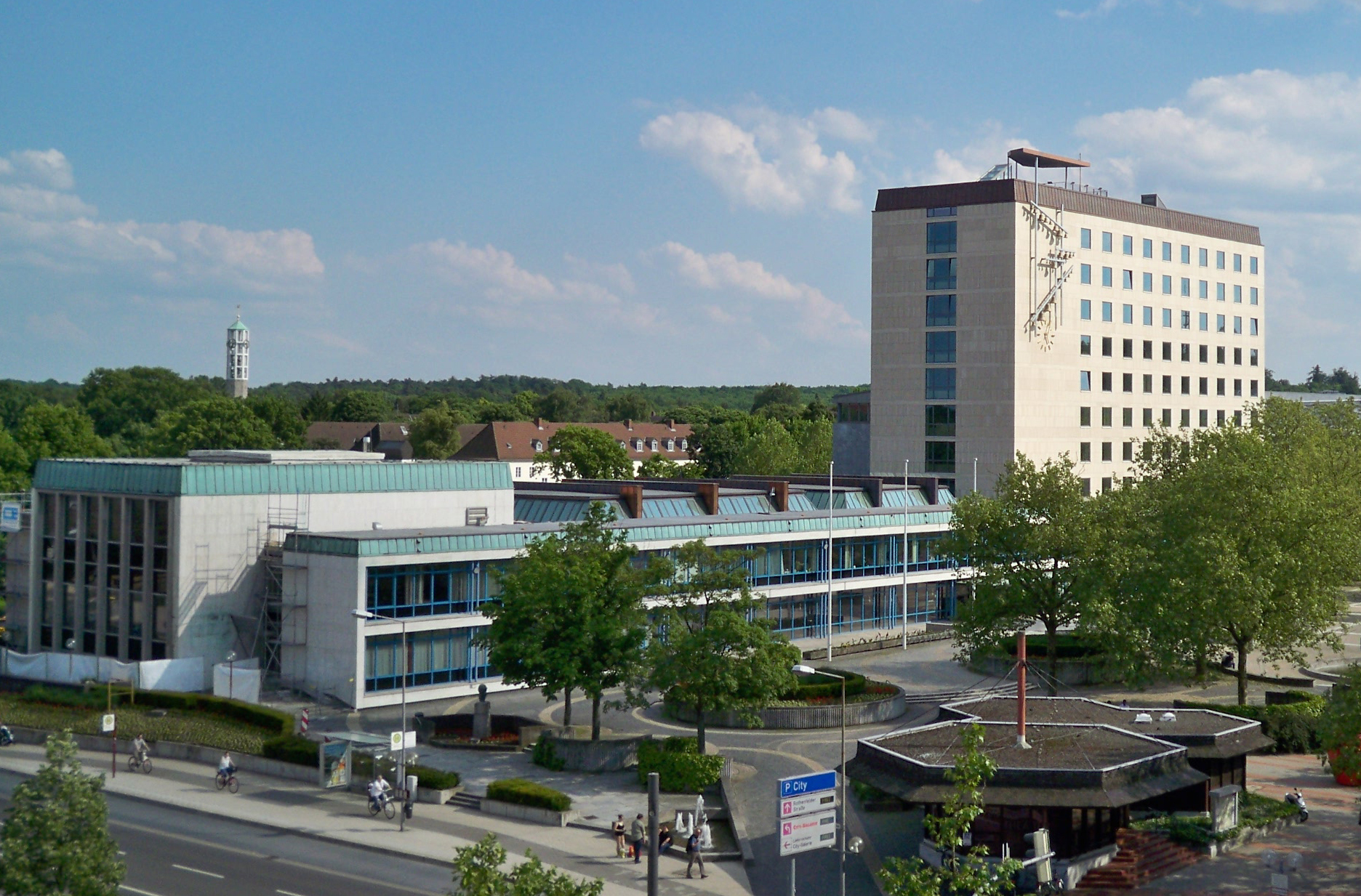
The city hall

The first mayor of the young Stadt des KdF-Wagens was the government assessor Karl Bock, on enactment #145 of the chief president of the government of Lüneburg effective from 1 July 1938. His allies were also deployed by the government.

In 1946, the military government of the British zone of occupation established a communal constitution following the British example. After this, citizens voted for a council that elected a volunteer mayor/lord mayor as the city's leader and representative. After 1946, the council elected a full-time director to lead the city council. In 2001, the city council's dual leadership was abolished. It is led by a full-time lord mayor who is also the city's representative. Since 2001, citizens directly elect the lord mayor. The council still has its own chairperson elected by the council's constitutive conference after every local election. The current Bürgermeister (mayor) of Wolfsburg is Dennis Weilmann.

The city has been described as a "social democratic utopia".

=== City council ===
The city council is made up of the fractions of the different parties (47 seats) and the lord mayor with one seat. The lord mayor is head of administration, thus the superior of all employees of the city council. The lord mayor is supported by four departmental heads who are voted in by the council on his suggestion. Together, they make up the board of directors of the city administration where the most important decisions concerning administration are deliberated weekly.

Results of the local elections on 11 September 2011:

| Party | Seats | Votes (%) | Votes |
|---|---|---|---|
| SPD | 17 | 37.7% | 53,355 |
| CDU | 14 | 31.6% | 44,635 |
| PUG | 5 | 11.9% | 16,769 |
| Bündnis 90/Die Grünen | 5 | 9.9% | 14,026 |
| PIRATEN | 2 | 3.9% | 5,528 |
| FDP | 1 | 2.4% | 3,326 |
| Wolfsburger Linke | 1 | 1.5% | 2,106 |
| WTZ | 1 | 1.2% | 1,673 |

Voter turnout: 49.4%

=== Emblems ===
Wolfsburg's emblem shows a silver two-tower castle with a closed gate on red ground over a green base with silver waved timbers. A golden wolf with a blue tongue paces over the castle's battlement. The city's flag is green and white.

Lower Saxony's Department of the Interior awarded the city of Wolfsburg's emblem in 1952 after it had been constituted in the association articles in 1947. In 1961, it was improved heraldically and newly awarded by the governmental executive committee of Lüneburg. The symbols of the wolf and the castle reflect the city's name (canting arm) and do not have a historical, directly conveyed reference. The flag was adopted in 1955.

Volkswagen used a modified version of the Wolfsburg coat of arms as its steering wheel emblem, (and occasionally as a hood ornament, on classic Beetles) until the early 1980s, when it was replaced by the VW roundel.

=== Regional authorities ===
The city of Wolfsburg is a member of the association Braunschweigische Landschaft e.V, with a registered office in Braunschweig and in the Lüneburgischen Landschaftsverband e.V, with a registered office in Uelzen. These associations were founded to foster cultural establishments in the regions.

== Architecture ==
Alvar Aalto Cultural Centre (1958–62)

Church of the Holy Spirit, Alvar Aalto (1958–62)

=== Historical castles ===
- The Schloss Wolfsburg (castle of Wolfsburg), a Weser renaissance castle of the 13th century, was first documented as the domicile of the noble lineage of Bartensleben in 1302. As the city is named after this castle, it is Wolfsburg's landmark.
- The Burg Neuhaus (castle of Neuhaus) is a medieval moat from the 14th century which has been owned by the city government since 1981.
- The Schloss Fallersleben (castle of Fallersleben) was completed in 1551. Since 1991 it has housed the Hoffmann-von-Fallersleben-Museum.

=== Museums ===
- The Kunstmuseum Wolfsburg (Wolfsburg Art Museum) is internationally renowned and has shown contemporary and modern international art since 1994.
- The Städtische Galerie (Municipal Gallery), located in the Schloss Wolfsburg, shows multifarious pieces of contemporary art.
- The AutoMuseum Volkswagen was opened in an old textile factory in Heßlingen in 1985.
- The Stadtmuseum Wolfsburg (City Museum) is a modern museum with an exhibition about the history of the castle, the region and the city. It is located inside Schloss Wolfsburg.
- The Hoffmann-von-Fallersleben-Museum in the castle of Fallersleben shows the history of German poetry and democracy, especially focused on the life of Hoffmann von Fallersleben between 1798 and 1874.
- The Heinrich-Büssing-Haus in Nordsteimke was opened on the initiative of the MAN-group in the house of Büssing's birth in 1988. It shows the life of Büssing and the development from craft to industry.
- The Burg Neuhaus (Neuhaus Castle) is a moat showing an exhibition of models of the castle and the water mill, late medieval weapons and documents concerning the life of people of the time before 1800.
- The Autostadt, Volkswagen's customer experience and delivery centre, attracts approximately 2 million visitors per year. The theme is (auto) mobility.
- The Phæno is a science center with 250 experiment stations on an exhibition space of nearly 6,000 square meters. The unique architecture was designed by Zaha Hadid.
- The Romantikpark Landleben (Romantik Park Landleben) in Kästorf is a theme park depicting a historical Lower Saxon village combined with parks and restaurants.

=== Alvar Aalto designs ===
- Heilig Geist Kirche or Church of the Holy Spirit
- Stephanuskirche or the Church of St. Stephen
- Alvar-Aalto-Kulturhaus or Alvar Aalto Cultural Centre

== Sport ==
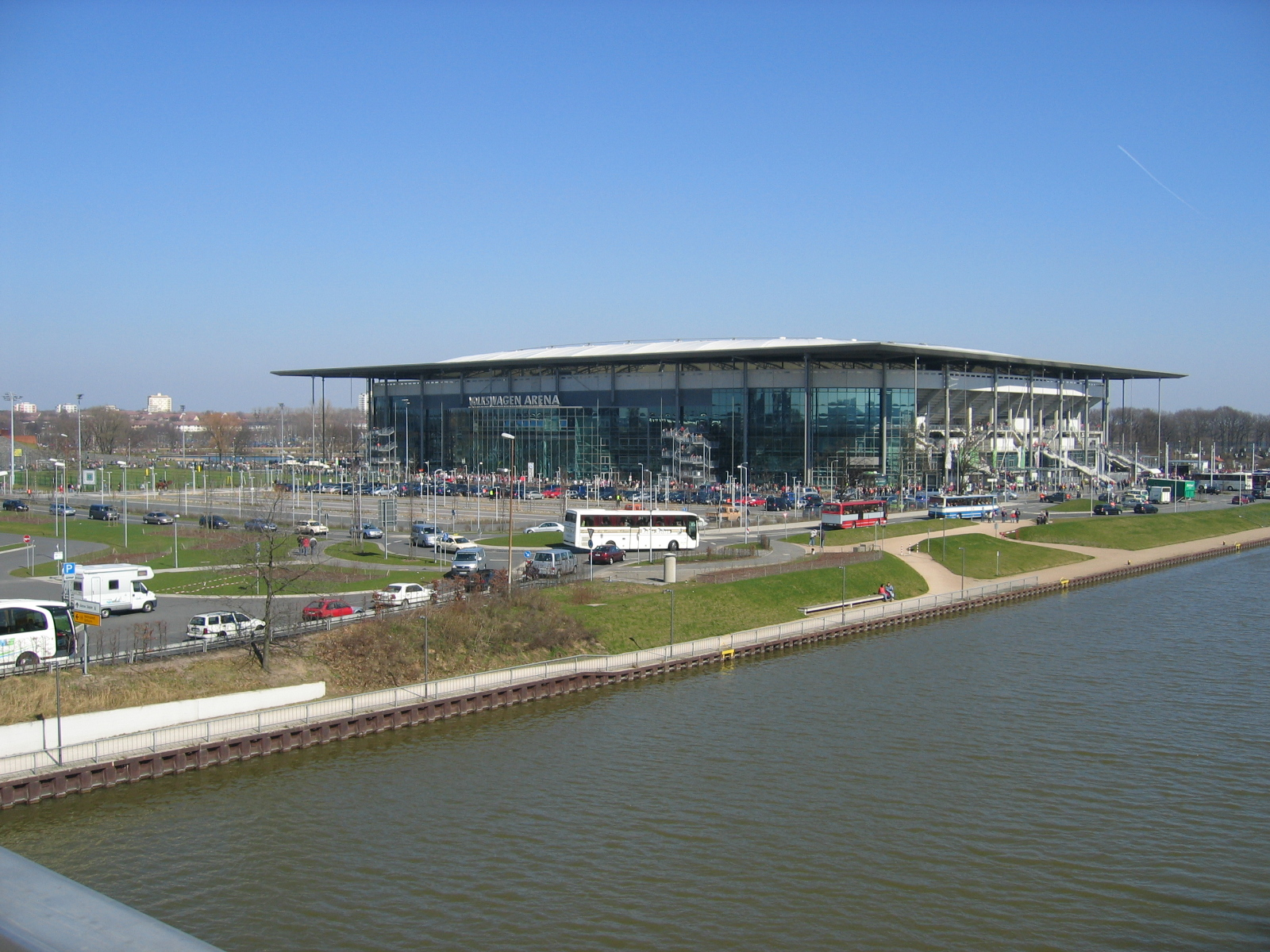
The Volkswagen Arena

The most famous professional sports club in the city is VfL Wolfsburg, established in 1945. The men's football team won the Bundesliga in 2009, the DFB-Pokal in 2015 and the DFL-Supercup in 2015. The women's football team has been even more successful, winning six Bundesliga titles and seven DFB-Pokal titles. The women's team has also succeeded in winning the UEFA Women's Champions League in two consecutive years, 2013 and 2014.

Wolfsburg is also the home of the ice hockey team Grizzlys Wolfsburg, which since 2007 has been a leading contender in the first-tier Deutsche Eishockey Liga, where it was runner-up in 2011, 2016 and 2017.

Also based in city is the Volkswagen Challenger tennis tournament, which has been held annually in Wolfsburg since 1993.

== Twin towns – sister cities ==
Wolfsburg is twinned with:

- Marignane, France (1963)
- Province of Pesaro and Urbino, Italy (1975)
- Halberstadt, Germany (1989)
- Tolyatti, Russia (1991)
- Bielsko-Biała, Poland (1998)
- Jiading (Shanghai), China (2007)
- Jendouba, Tunisia (2010)

=== Friendly cities ===
Wolfsburg also has friendly relations with:

- Popoli, Italy
- Sarajevo, Bosnia and Herzegovina (1985)
- Changchun, China (2006)
- Puebla, Mexico (2010)
- Toyohashi, Japan (2011)
- Chattanooga, United States (2011)
- Dalian, China (2011)
- Nanhai (Foshan), China (2015)

== Notable people ==
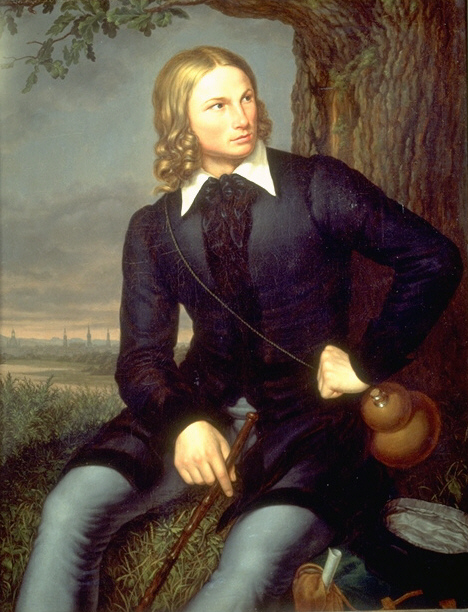
Hoffmann von Fallersleben painted by CGC Schumacher, 1819

- August Heinrich Hoffmann von Fallersleben (1798–1874), poet, writer of the German national anthem.
- Hanns Kerrl (1887–1941), politician (NSDAP), Reich Ministry for Church Affairs
- Hartwig Hohnsbein (born 1937), political scientist, retired pastor, author
- Rolf-Dieter Postlep (born 1946), economist, president of the University of Kassel in 2000–2015
- Günter Lach (1954–2021), politician, member of the Bundestag and mayor of Vorsfelde and Wolfsburg.
- Gabriele von Lutzau (born 1954), artist and sculptor, stewardess on Lufthansa Flight 181, kidnapped in 1977
- Wolfgang Müller (born 1957), artist, musician and writer
- Peter Bialobrzeski (born 1961), photographer
- Edward Berger (born 1970), film director and screenwriter
- Dero Goi (born 1970), musician, founder and lead vocalist of Oomph!
- Sascha Paeth (born 1970), musician; guitarist, bassist, record producer and mixer
- Heidi Schmidt, (DE Wiki) (1972–2010), novelist, children's author
- Sunhild Kleingärtner (born 1974), historian and archaeologist, specialising in maritime history and archaeology
- Valeska Homburg (born 1976), journalist
- Amanda Somerville (born 1979), American singer-songwriter and musician; lives locally
- Falko Mohrs (born 1984), politician (SPD)
- Anna-Katharina Samsel (born 1985), figure skater, model and actress, grew up in Wolfsburg

=== Sport ===
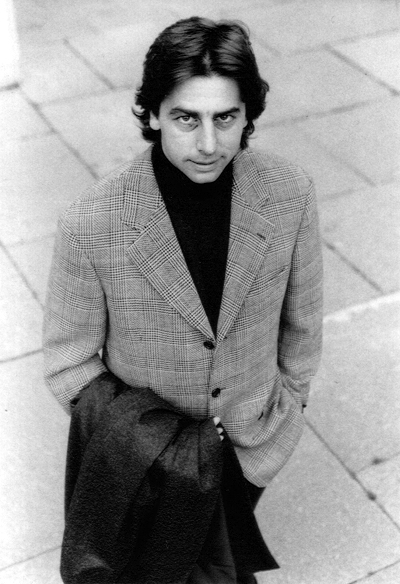
Siegfried Reich, 2008

- Liane Winter (1942–2021), marathon runner, record breaking local marathon run in 1974
- Siegfried Reich (born 1959), footballer, played 434 games
- Petra Damm (born 1961), footballer, played 43 games for Germany women
- Eckhardt Schultz (born 1964), rower, team gold medal in the men's eight at the 1988 Summer Olympics
- Michael Knauth (born 1965), field hockey player, team gold medallist at the 1992 Summer Olympics
- Jan Schanda (born 1977), footballer, played over 260 games
- Stefanie Gottschlich (born 1978), footballer, played 45 games for Germany women
- Janne Schaefer (born 1981), swimmer, grew up in Wolfsburg
- Andrzej Rybski (born 1985), footballer who played over 375 games
- Oliver Kragl (born 1990), footballer who has played over 350 games
- Kevin Wolze (born 1990), footballer who has played over 350 games
- Sophie Scheder (born 1997), artistic gymnast, the 2016 Summer Olympics bronze medalist on the uneven bars.

== See also ==
- Metropolitan region Hannover-Braunschweig-Göttingen-Wolfsburg
