= Rolf-Dieter Postlep =

German economist

Rolf-Dieter Postlep (born 17 March 1946 in Wolfsburg) is a German economist and President of the University of Kassel from 2000 to 2015.

== Education ==
Rolf-Dieter Postlep completed his secondary education in 1965 at the Ratsgymnasium in Wolfsburg. He then trained as a banker at the Frankfurter Bank in Frankfurt am Main, Hessen. In 1969 he began studying at the University of Marburg and graduated in 1973 with a degree in economics.

== Academics ==
After completing his studies, Postlep accepted a position as economics research assistant in the University of Marburg Department of Finance in 1974. He received his doctorate in Marburg in 1978 and worked as a research assistant until 1984 and as a lecturer beginning in 1985. In 1990, Postlep completed a post-doctoral qualification in economics and political economy, also in Marburg. From 1992 to 1993, he held a guest professorship in economic policy at the University of Kassel. From 1994 to 1999, Postlep was a department manager at the German Institute for Economic Research (DIW) in Berlin, during which time he was also a lecturer at the University of Potsdam. Beginning in 1996, Postlep was a full professor and head of the Department of Economic Policy at the University of Kassel. In September 2000, Postlep defeated two competitors to succeed Hans Brinckmann as University of Kassel President. In February 2006, he was endorsed for a second six-year term and then a third six-year term on 1 February 2012.
