= Oskar Schade =

German philologist (1826–1906)

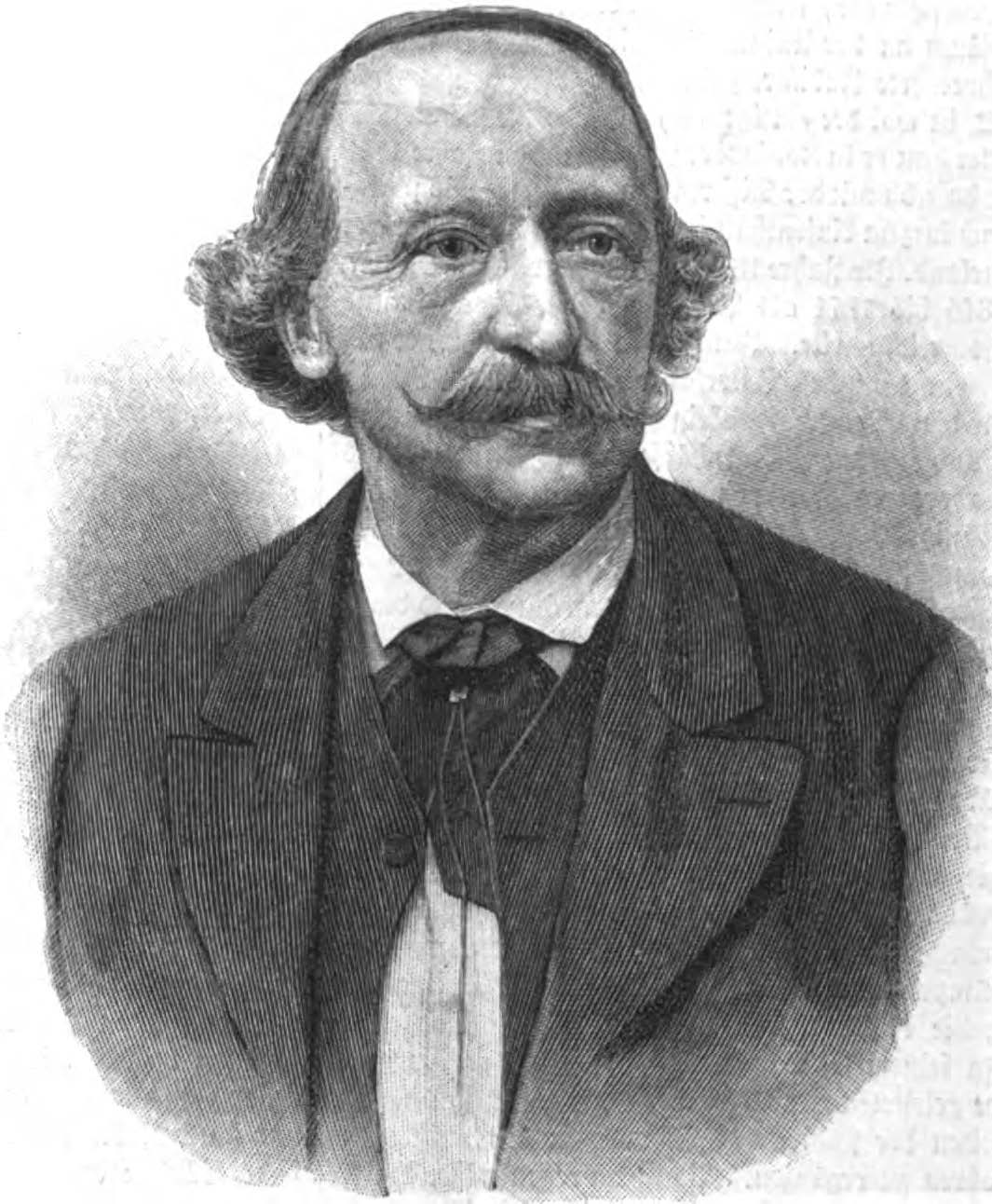

Oskar Schade (25 March 1826 – 30 December 1906) was a German philologist and Germanist born in Erfurt.

In 1860, he received his habilitation at Halle, and from 1863 to 1906 was a professor at the University of Königsberg.

He was the author of the influential Altdeutsches Wörterbuch (Old German Dictionary), and with August Heinrich Hoffmann von Fallersleben (1798-1874), was co-editor of the Weimarisches Jahrbuch für deutsche Sprache, Literatur und Kunst (Weimar Annals of German language, literature and art). Other noted works by Schade include:

- Geistliche Gedichte des 14. und 15. Jahrhunderts vom Niederrhein (Spiritual poems from the 14th and 15th century of the Lower Rhine), 1854.
- Satiren und Pasquille aus der Reformationszeit (Pasquille and satire from the time of the Reformation), 1863.
- Deutsche Handwerkslieder, 1865.
