= Stephanuskirche (Wolfsburg) =

Church in Wolfsburg, Germany

Coordinates: 52.39429°N 10.75409°E

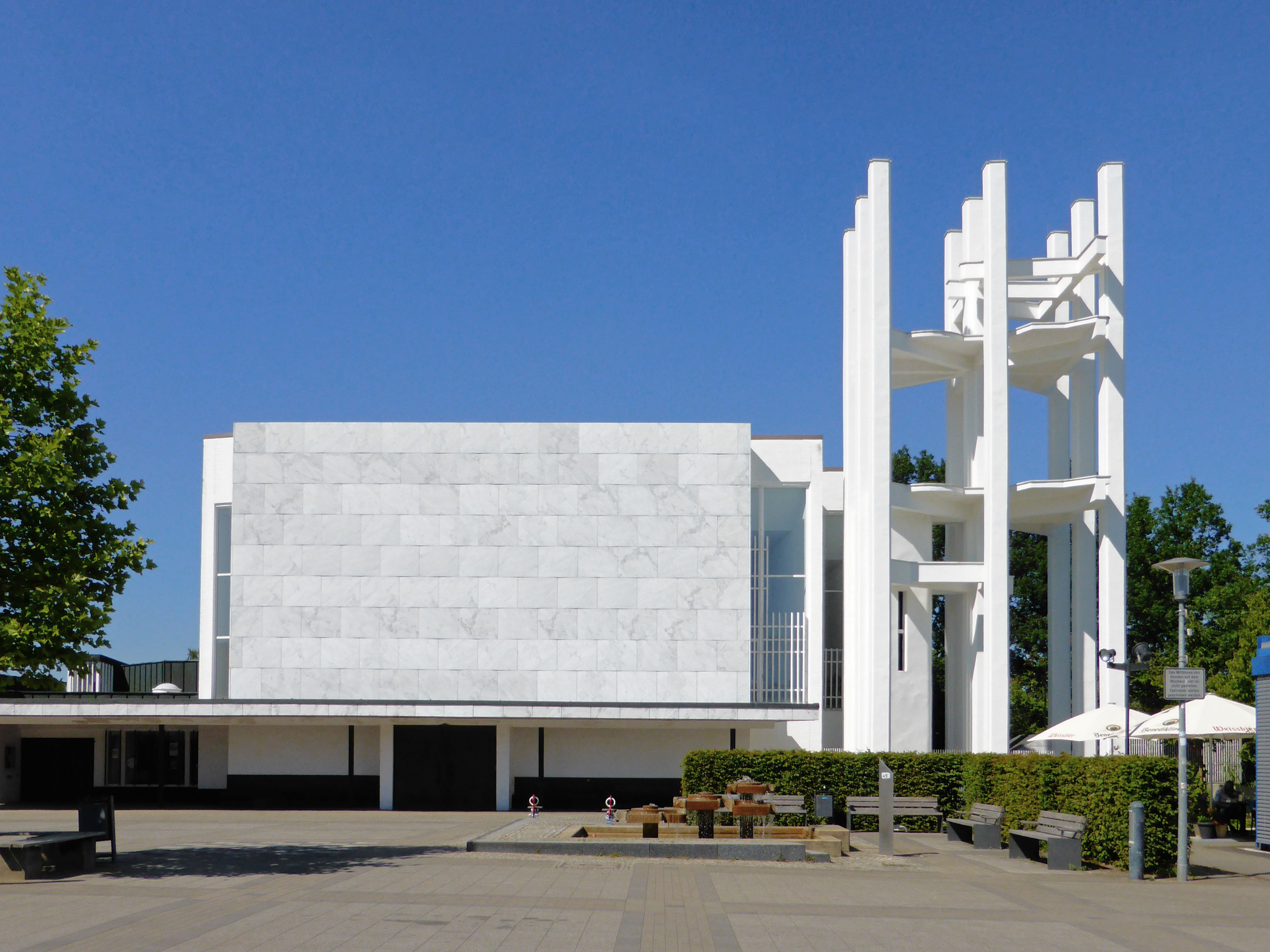
- Interactive map of the Stephanuskirche area

General information
- Architectural style: International Style
- Location: Wolfsburg; Germany, Detmeroder Markt 6, 38444
- Construction started: 1965
- Completed: 1968

Design and construction
- Architect: Alvar Aalto

Stephanuskirche (Evangelical Lutheran Church of St. Stephen) also known as Detmerode Church is a church and parish center in Wolfsburg, Germany designed by Finnish architect Alvar Aalto in 1963. Completed in 1968, the building is a prominent example of International modernism in Germany.

The church contains 250 seats and can be configured to hold a capacity of 600 when needed.

== Gallery ==
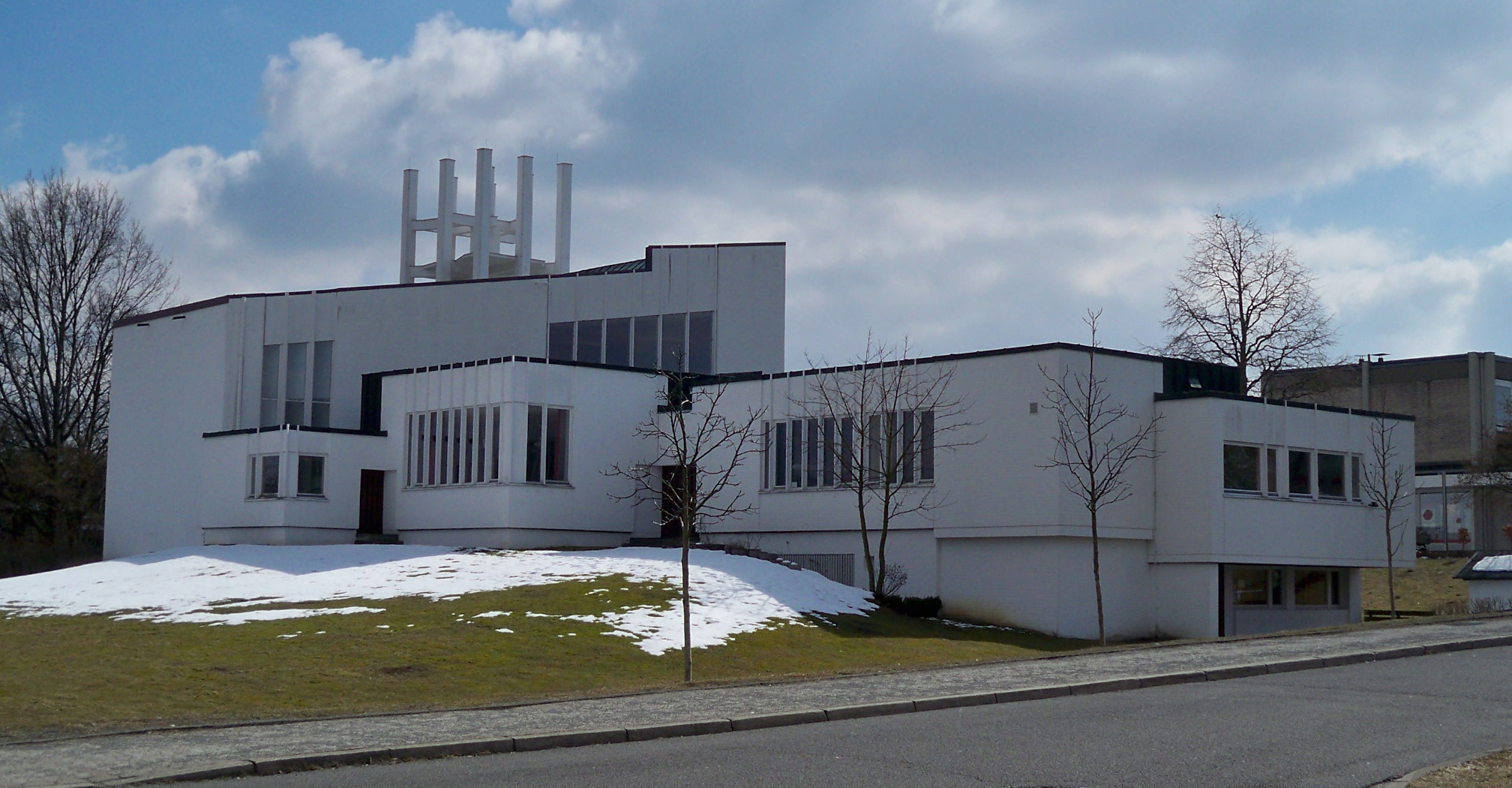
Exterior

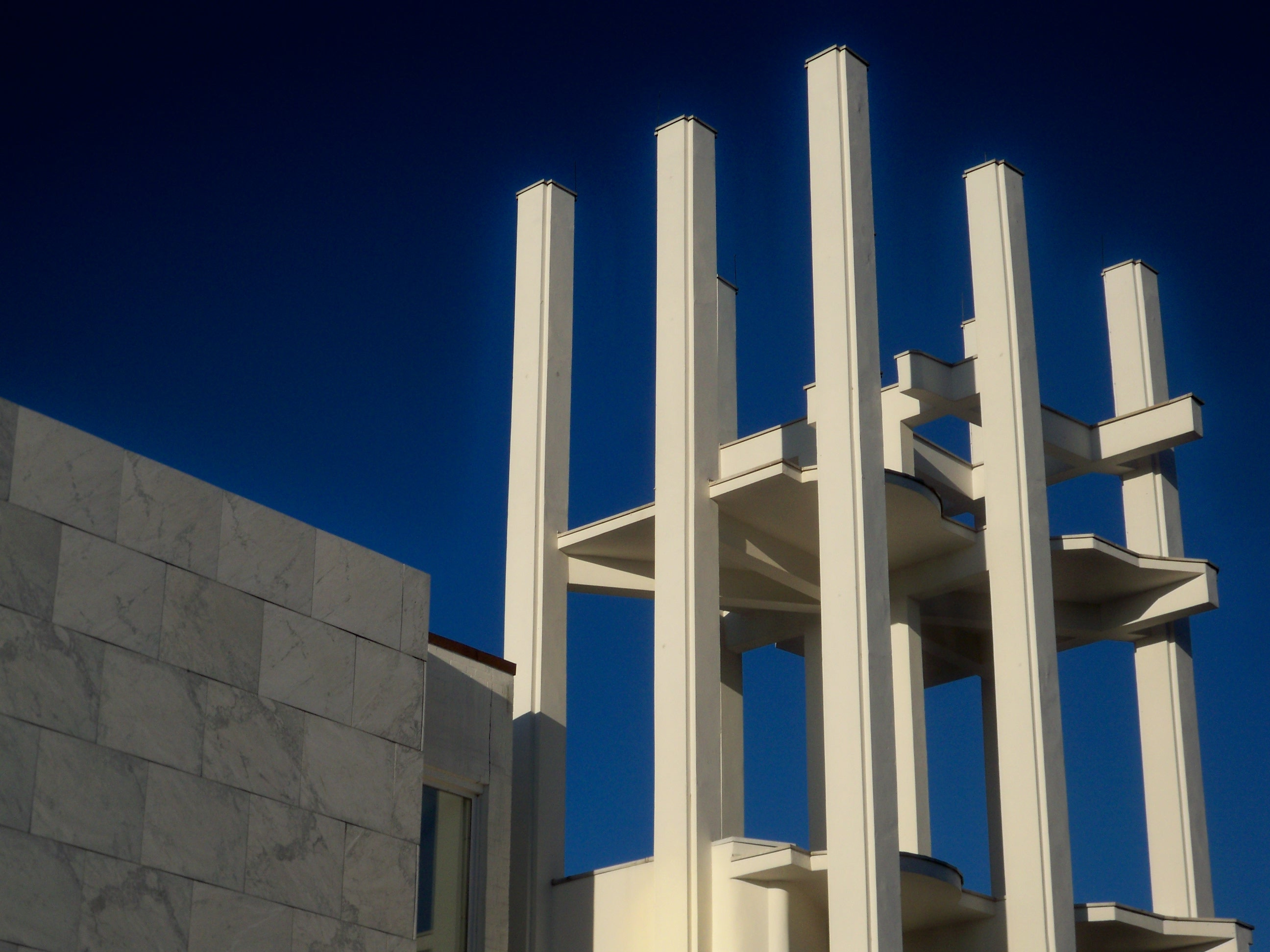
Tower

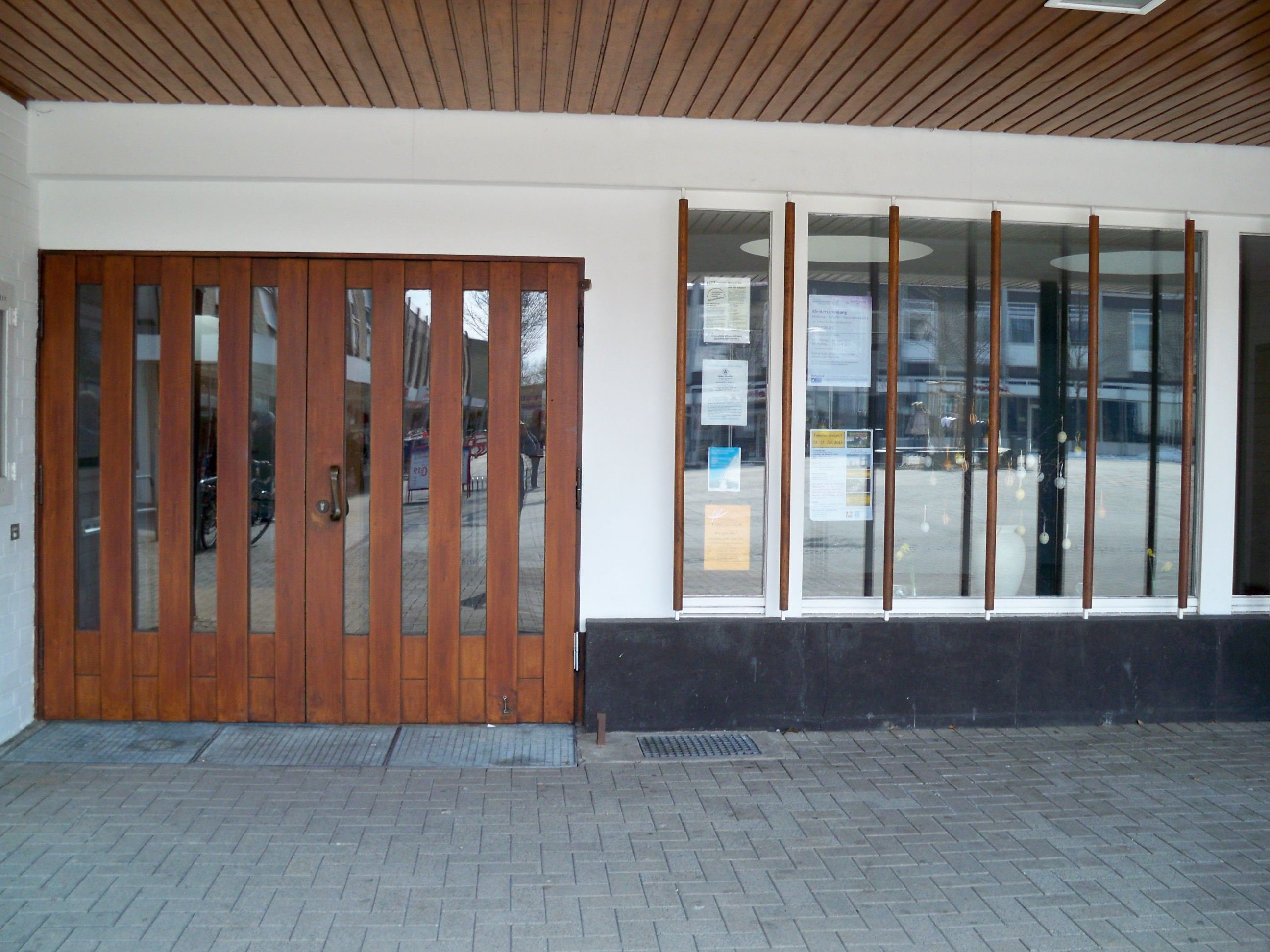
Entrance

== See also ==
- Church of the Holy Spirit, Wolfsburg
- Alvar Aalto Cultural Centre
