= Alvar Aalto Cultural Centre =

Cultural venue in Germany

Coordinates: 52.4197°N 10.7860°E

The Alvar Aalto Cultural Centre (German: Alvar-Aalto-Kulturhaus) is a cultural venue in the city of Wolfsburg, Lower Saxony, Germany, designed by the renowned Finnish architect Alvar Aalto in 1958 and inaugurated in 1962. It comprises a library, educational and youth facilities, municipal offices and retail premises.

== Gallery ==
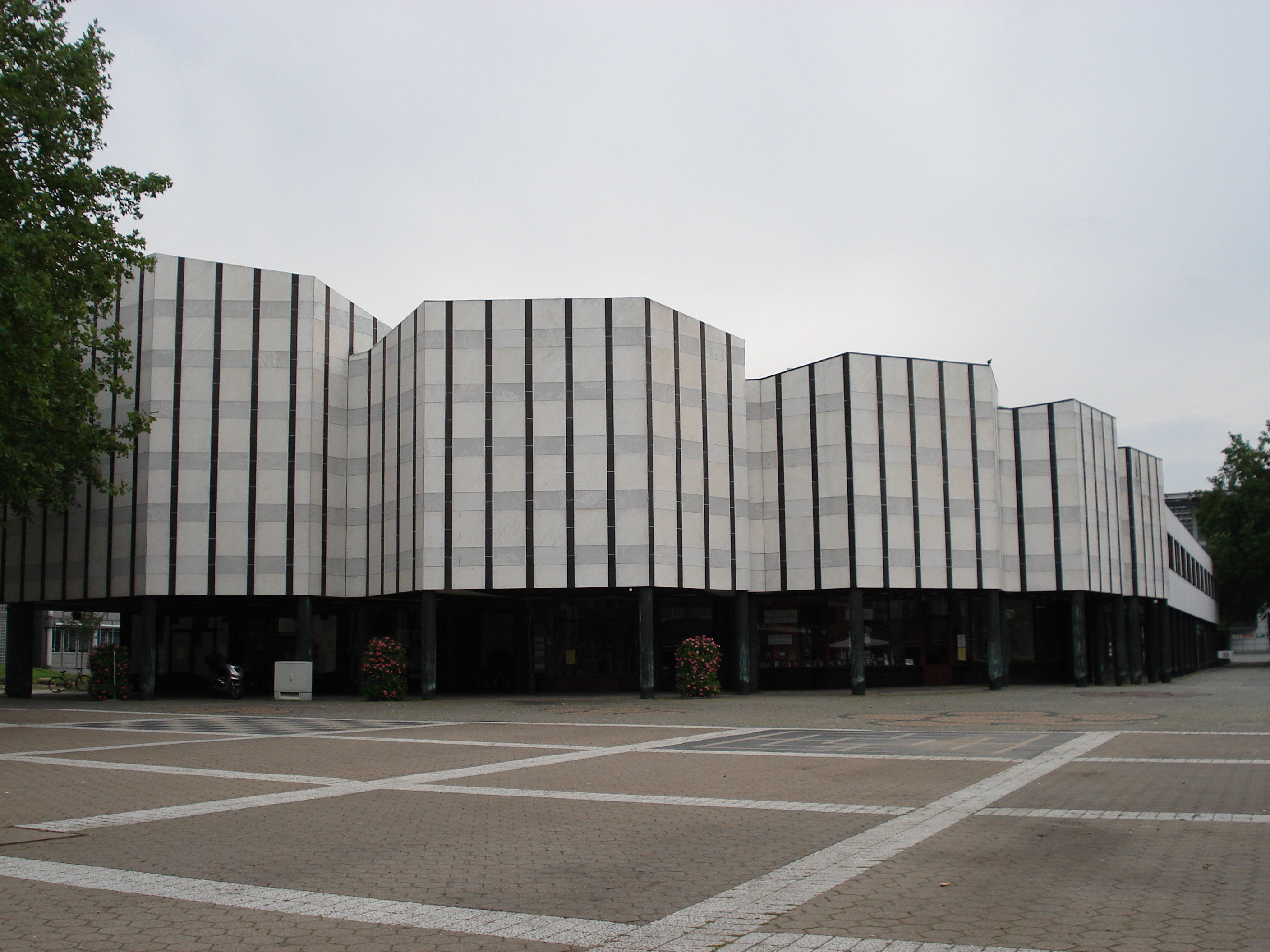
Northern elevation (main facade)

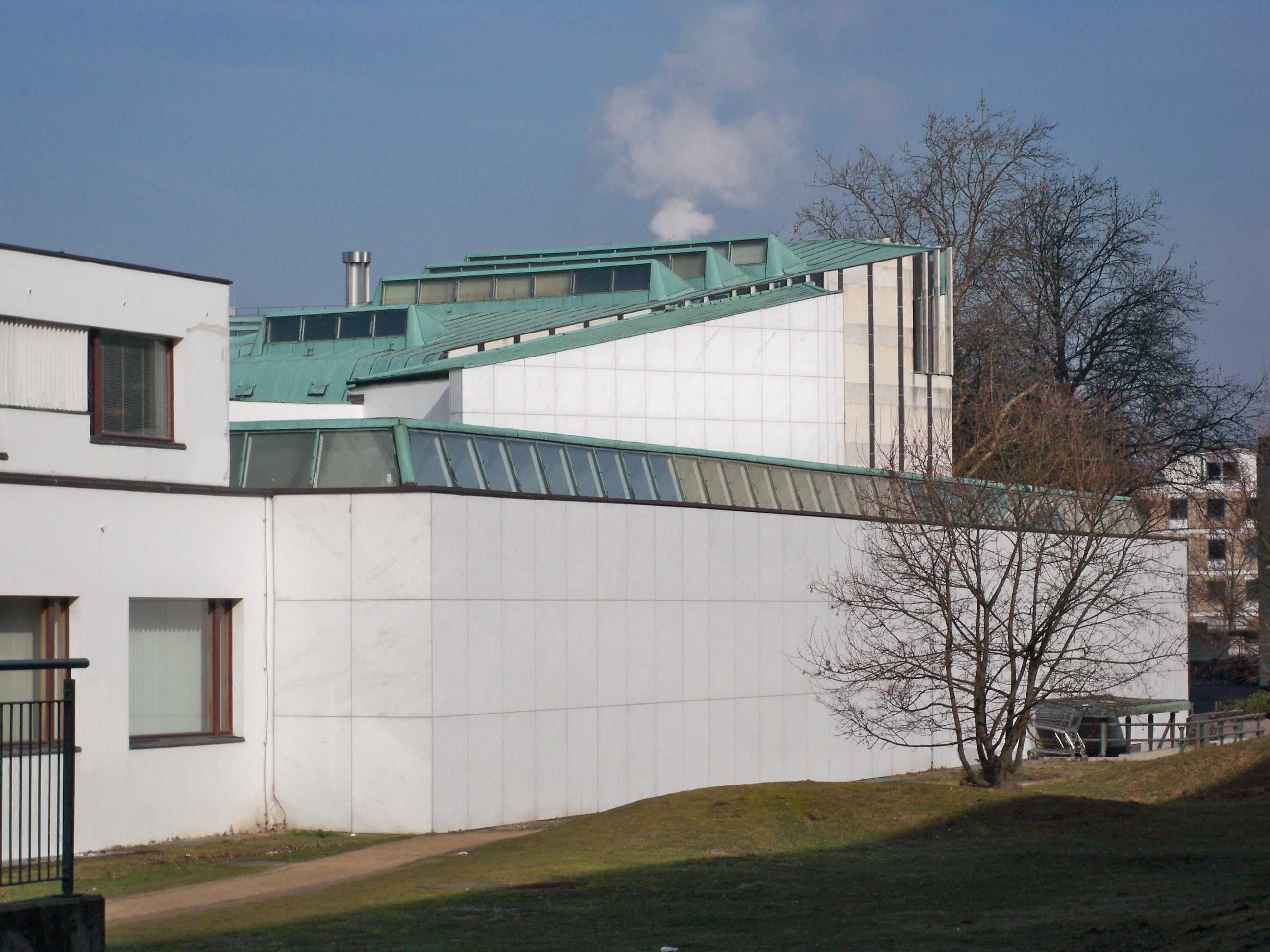
Southeastern elevation

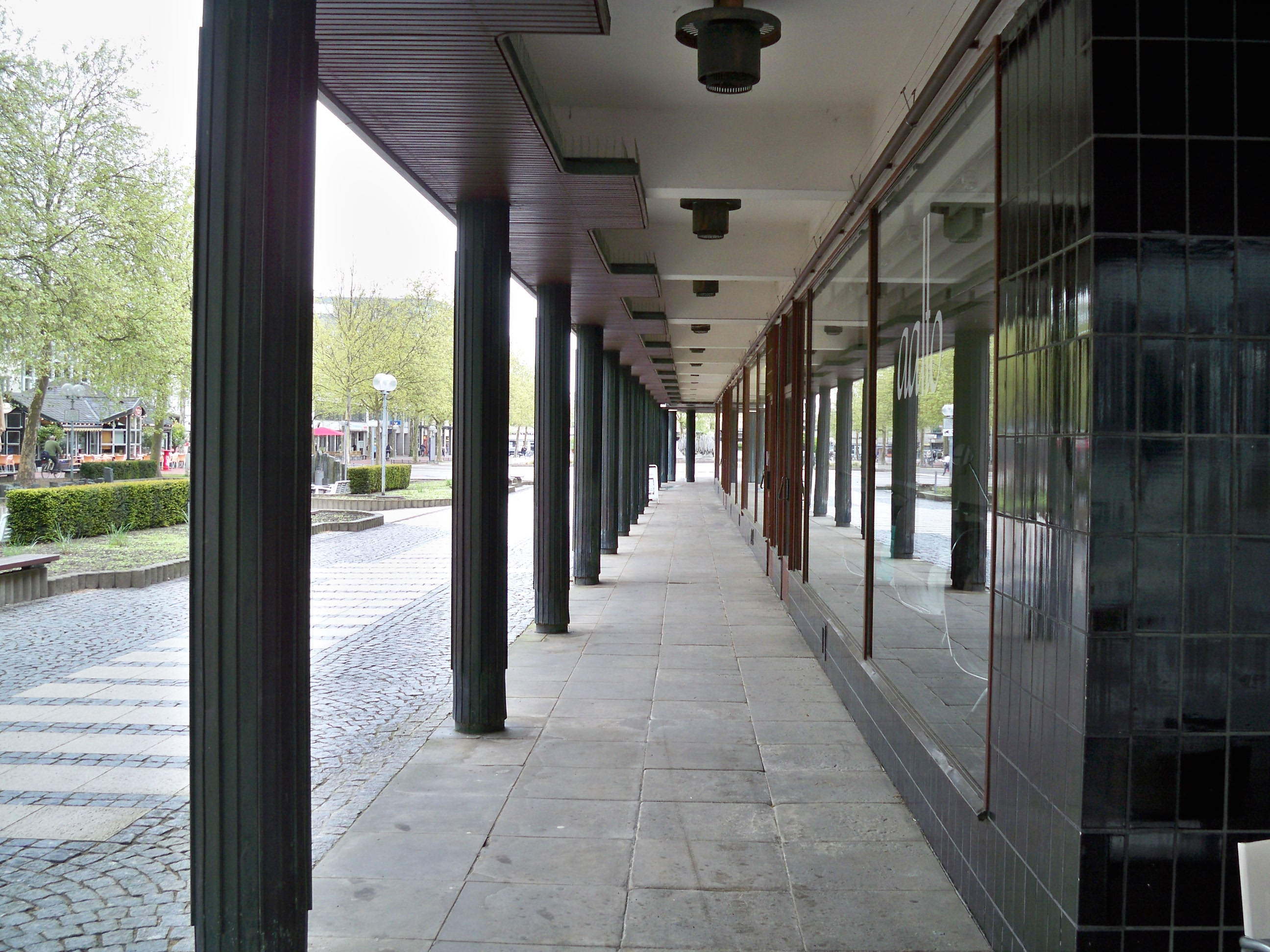
Arcade detail

Library interior

== See also ==
- Church of the Holy Spirit (Wolfsburg)
- Stephanuskirche (Wolfsburg)
