= Church of the Holy Spirit, Wolfsburg =

Building in Lower Saxony, Germany

Coordinates: 52.40970°N 10.76949°E

Church of the Holy Spirit
- Heilig Geist Kirche
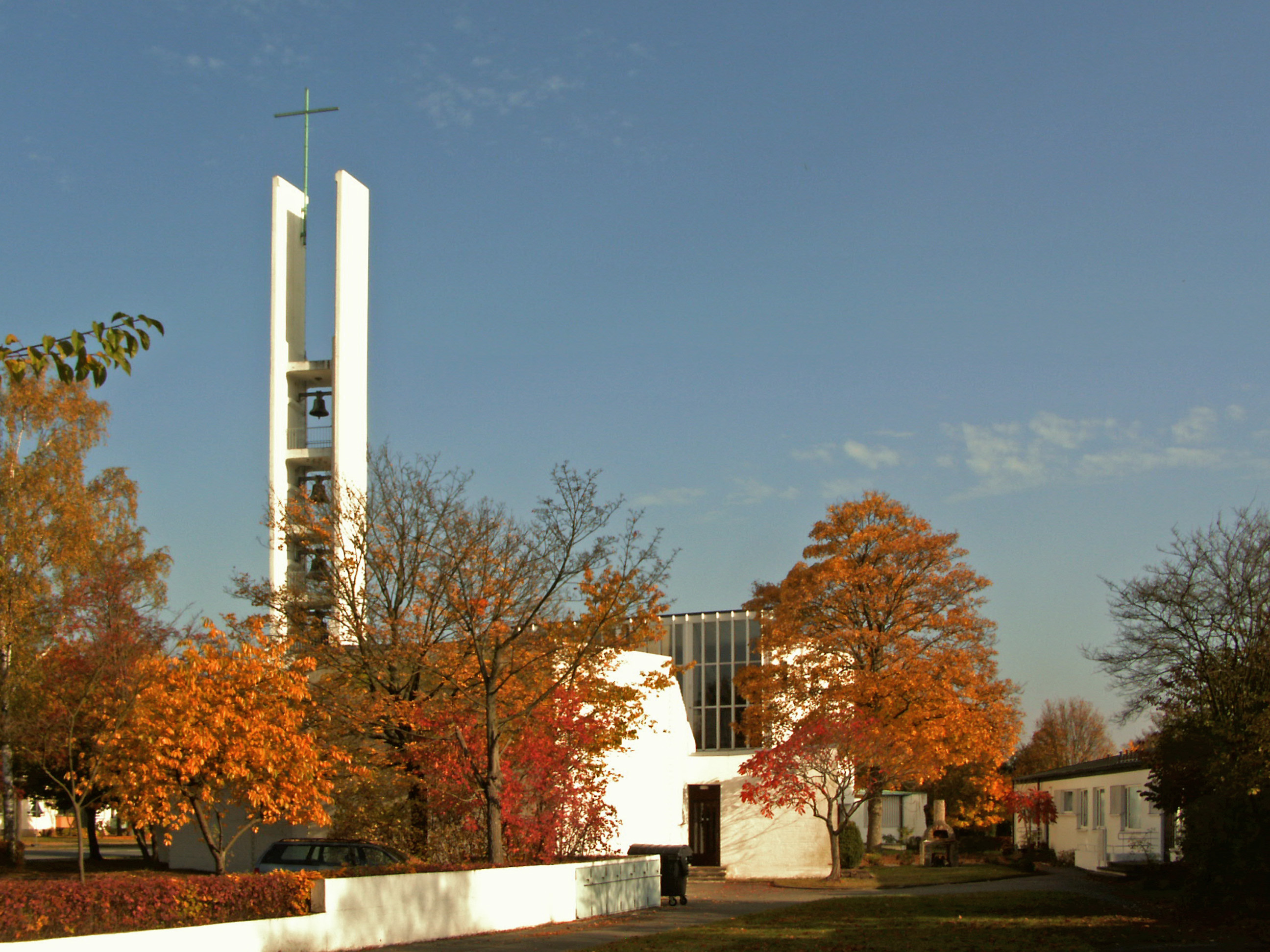
- Church exterior
- Interactive map of the Church of the Holy Spirit area

General information
- Location: Wolfsburg; Germany
- Construction started: 1961
- Opened: 1962

Height
- Height: 32 meters (tower)

Design and construction
- Architect: Alvar Aalto

Church of the Holy Spirit (German: Heilig Geist Kirche) is a Lutheran church and parish center in Wolfsburg, Germany. The building is a notable project of Finnish architect Alvar Aalto.

November 1958, Alvar Aalto was personally commissioned to design the church by then-pastor Erich Bammel; Aalto began designing the building the same year. The design was completed and construction started in 1961. The church opened the following year.

== See also ==
- Stephanuskirche (Wolfsburg)
- Alvar Aalto Cultural Centre
