= Carl Georg Christian Schumacher =

German painter

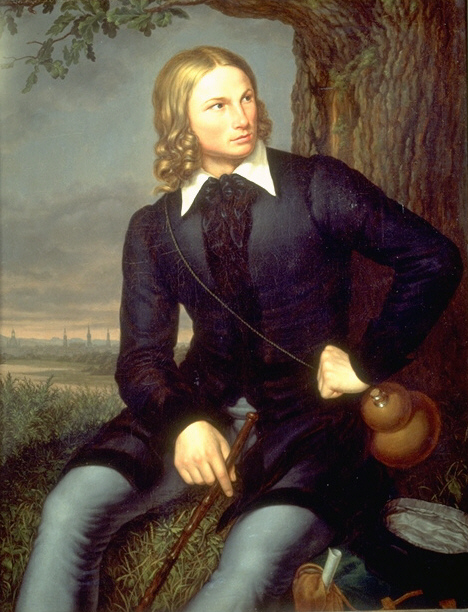
Portrait of August Heinrich Hoffmann von Fallersleben by Carl Georg Christian Schumacher (1819)

Carl Georg Christian Schumacher (14 May 1797, Bad Doberan – 22 June 1869, Schwerin) was a German painter.
