= Sunhild Kleingärtner =

German historian and archaeologist

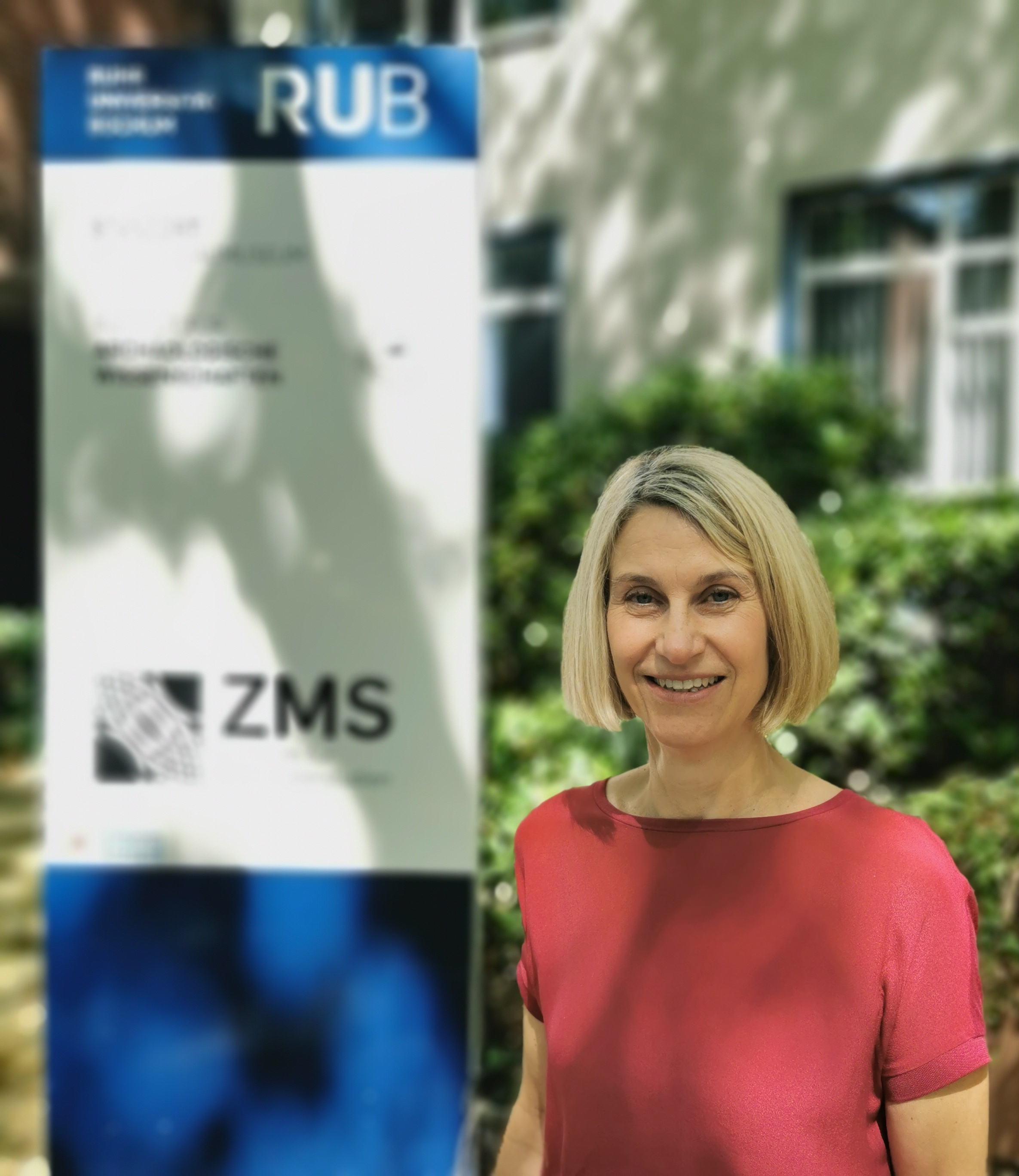
- Sunhild Kleingärtner in 2026
- Born: 1974 (age 51–52); Wolfsburg, West Germany

Sunhild Kleingärtner (born 1974) is a German historian and archaeologist, specialising in maritime history and maritime archaeology.

== Career ==
Kleingärtner was born in Wolfsburg, and began her studies at the University of Kiel in 1994. Her research focused on prehistoric archaeology, classical archaeology and art history. In 2000 she gained a Master of Arts degree, and thereafter worked as a research assistant at the Kiel Institute of Prehistoric and Protohistoric Archaeology (Institut für Ur- und Frühgeschichte in Kiel), where she took over the management of terrestrial and subaquatic excavations. In 2004 Kleingärtner gained her PhD from the University of Kiel, with a study of the archaeological finds at Hedeby harbour (Title: 'Der Pressmodelfund aus dem Hafen von Haithabu'). The same year, she was a researcher on the Tissø project at the National Museum of Denmark at Copenhagen. Between 2006 and 2012 Kleingärtner was a researcher at the University of Kiel, where she completed her Habilitationsschrift on ‘The Early Phase of Urbanisation in the Early Middle Ages on the Southern Baltic Sea Coast’ (Die frühe Phase der Urbanisierung im Frühmittelalter an der südlichen Ostseeküste). In 2013 Kleingärtner took posts as director of the German Maritime Museum at Bremerhaven and as professor of maritime history and maritime archaeology at the University of Bremen. In 2022 Kleingärtner received a Thomas Mann fellowship.

== Selected publications ==
- Edited with T. Newfield, S. Rossignol and D. Wehner: Landscapes and Societies in Medieval Europe East of the Elbe. Interactions between Environmental Settings and Cultural Transformations, Toronto 2013.
- Edited with U. Müller and J. Scheschkewitz: Kulturwandel im Spannungsfeld von Tradition und Innovation. Festschrift für Michael Müller-Wille, Neumünster 2013.
- Rauben, Plündern, Morden oder andere Gründe für die Aufgabe der frühmittelalterlichen Seehandelsplätze an der südlichen Ostseeküste?, in: O. Heinrich-Tamáska (ed.): Rauben, Plündern, Morden - Nachweis von Zerstörung und kriegerischer Gewalt im archäologischen Befund, Hamburg 2013, pp. 357–372.
- Siedlungsarchäologische Untersuchungen zwischen Schwentine und Oder in frühgeschichtlicher Zeit, in: J. Drauschke/R. Prien/S. Ristow (ed.): Untergang und Neuanfang. Tagungsbeiträge der Arbeitsgemeinschaft Spätantike und Frühmittelalter 3 und 4 (Studien zu Spätantike und Frühmittelalter 3), Hamburg 2011, pp. 241–261.
- Der Pressmodelfund aus dem Hafen von Haithabu (Ausgrabungen in Haithabu 12), Neumünster 2007 (= Dissertation).
- Unterwasserarchäologische Prospektion und Dokumentation von Flussübergängen des 7.-16. Jahrhunderts - Einblicke in die unterwasserarchäologische Ausbildung am Kieler Institut für Ur- und Frühgeschichte, In: Starigard 8, 2007, pp. 72–77.
- Archäologie im Tauchanzug, in: Schleswig-Holstein Maritim, Spezial (Ausstellungskatalog) Flensburg 2006, pp. 11–13.
- Fibeln und Anhänger vom Typ Terslev und ihre gegossenen Imitationen. In: Michael Müller-Wille (ed.): Zwischen Tier und Kreuz. Untersuchungen zur wikingerzeitlichen Ornamentik im Ostseeraum (Studien zur Siedlungsgeschichte und Archäologie der Ostseegebiete 4), Neumünster 2004, 205-376 (= Magisterarbeit).
