= August Heinrich Hoffmann von Fallersleben =

German poet (1798–1874)

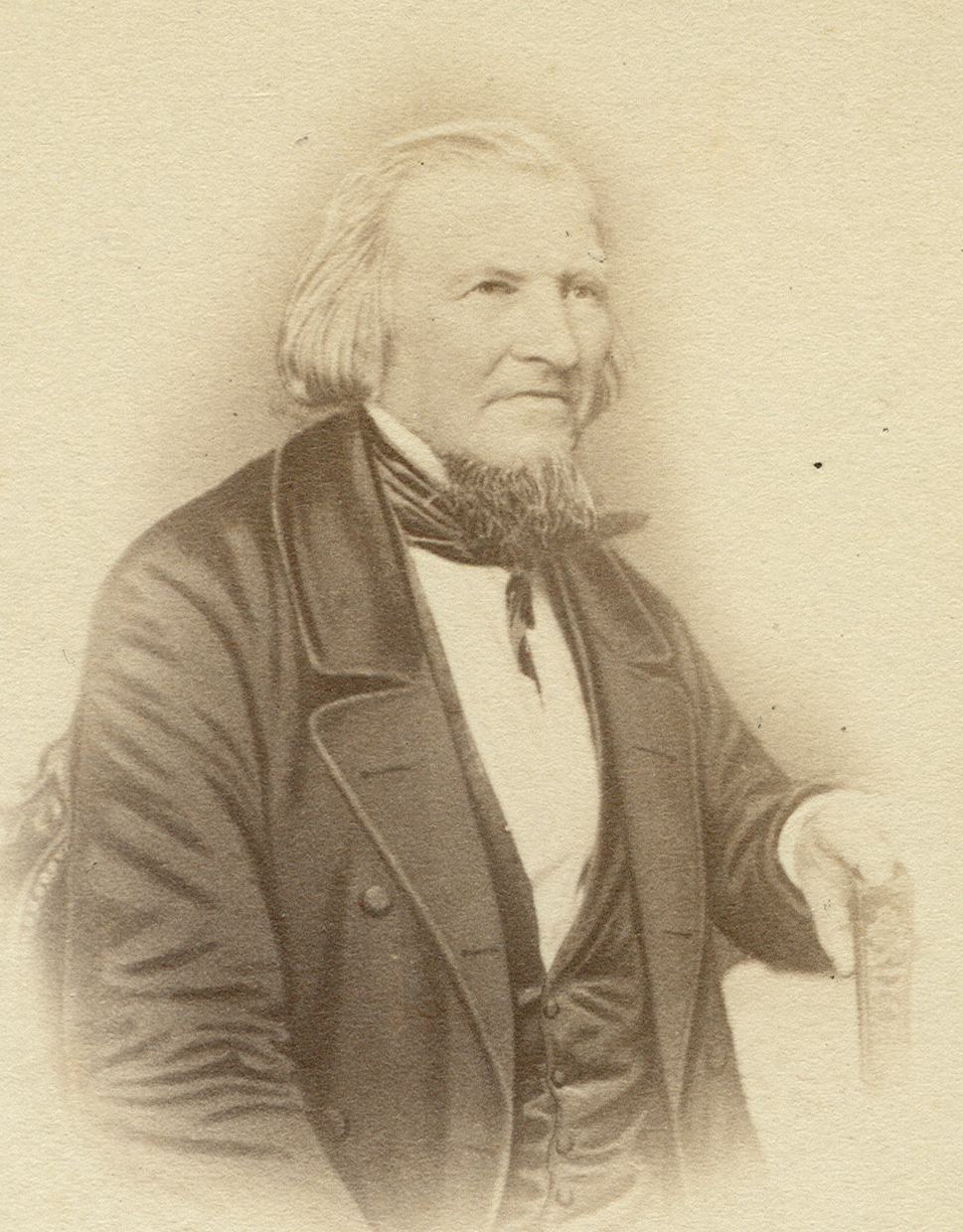
- Born: August Heinrich Hoffmann; 2 April 1798; Fallersleben, Brunswick-Lüneburg
- Died: 19 January 1874 (aged 75); Höxter, Germany
- Occupations: Poet, librarian, professor
- Notable work: "Das Lied der Deutschen"

August Heinrich Hoffmann von Fallersleben ( [ˈaʊɡʊst ˈhaɪnʁɪç ˈhɔfman fɔn ˈfalɐsˌleːbn̩], after his hometown; 2 April 1798 – 19 January 1874) was a German poet associated with the Young Germany movement. He is best known for writing "Das Lied der Deutschen", whose third stanza is now the national anthem of Germany, and a number of popular children's songs.

== Biography ==
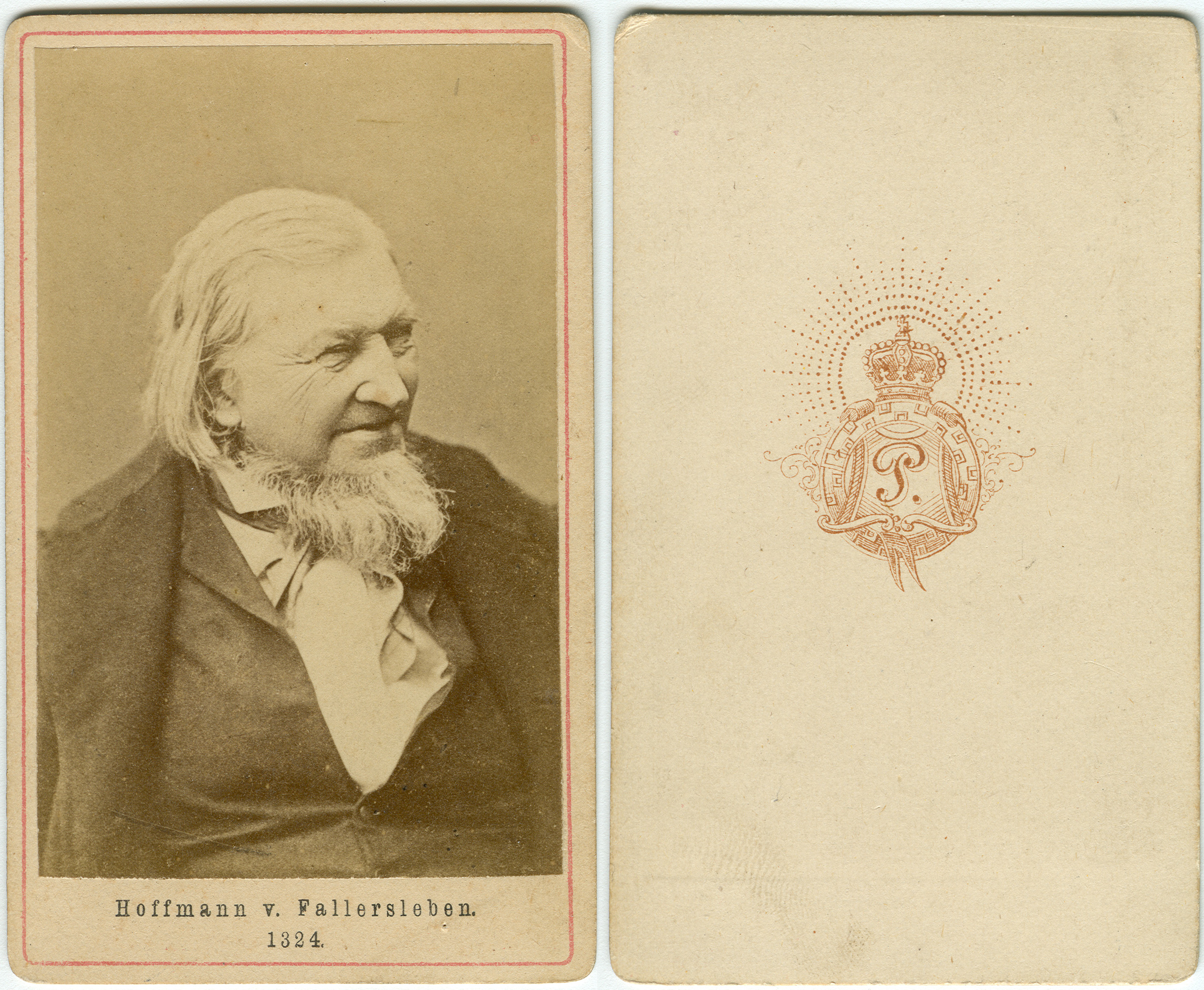
Carte de visite of Hoffmann, card no. "1324" by an unidentified photographer with crown over the letter "P", about 1860

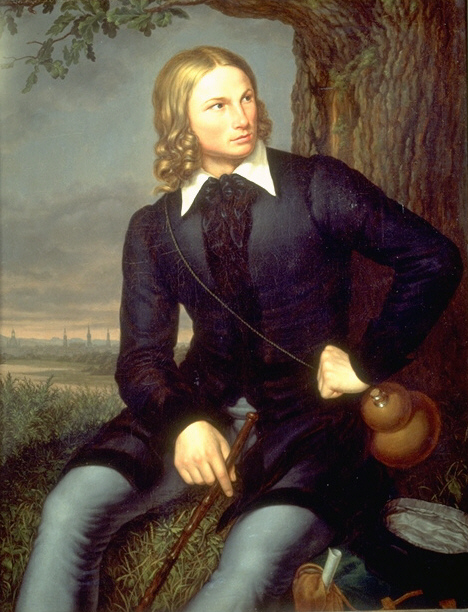
Portrait of Hoffmann by Carl Georg Christian Schumacher (1819)

Hoffmann was born in Fallersleben in Lower Saxony, then in the duchy of Brunswick-Lüneburg.

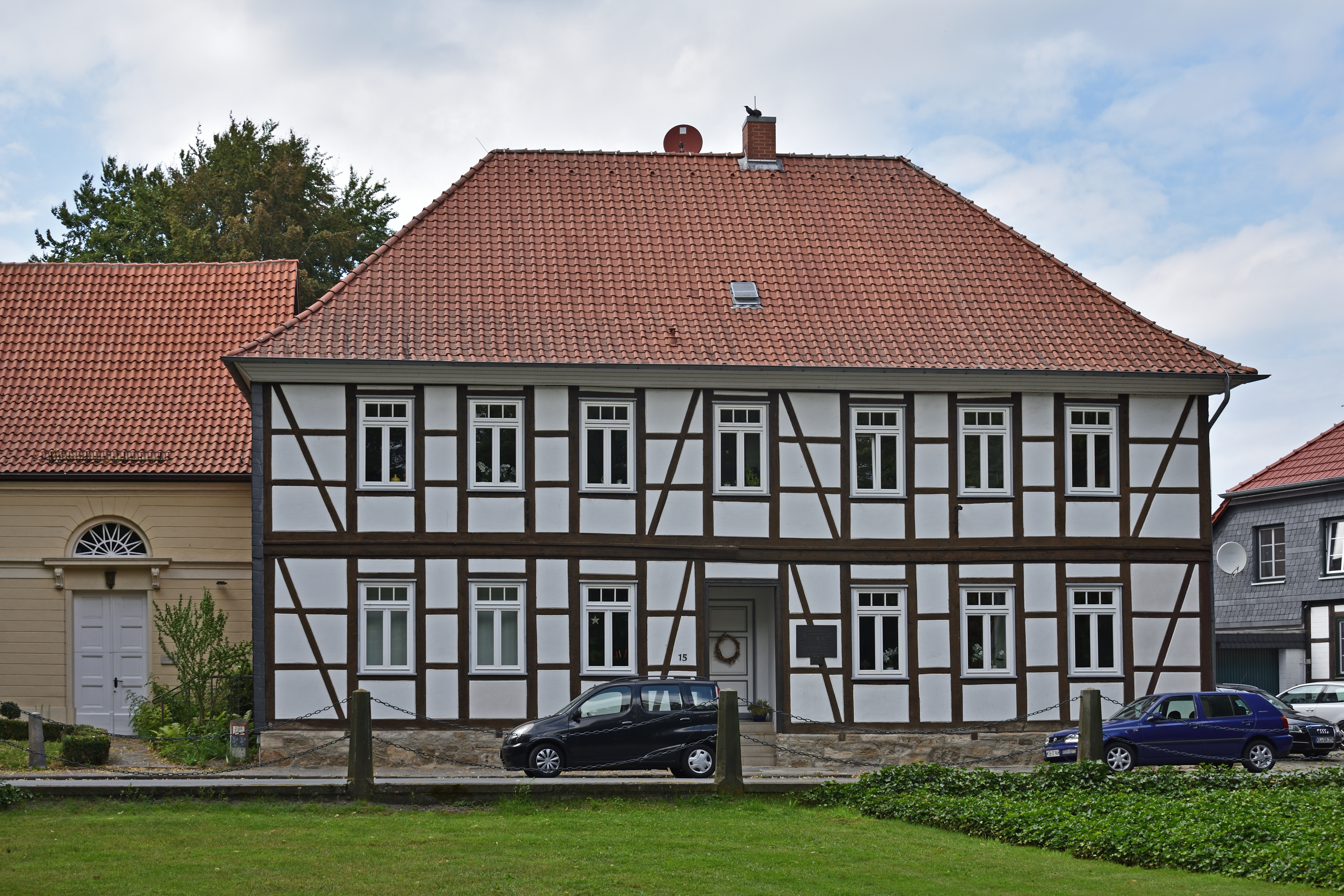
House in Alt-Wolfsburg where von Fallersleben was staying with his friend David Lochte in 1848 before the revolution

The son of a merchant and mayor of his native city, he was educated at the classical schools of Helmstedt and Braunschweig, and afterwards at the universities of Göttingen and Bonn. His original intention was to study theology, but he soon devoted himself entirely to literature. In 1823 he was appointed custodian of the university library at Breslau, a post which he held till 1838. He was also made extraordinary professor of the German language and literature at that university in 1830, and ordinary professor in 1835. Hoffmann was deprived of his chair in 1842 in consequence of his Unpolitische Lieder (1840–1841, "Unpolitical Songs"), which gave much offence to the authorities in Prussia.

During his exile, he traveled in Germany, Switzerland and Italy, and lived for two or three years in Mecklenburg, of which he became a naturalized citizen. After the revolution of 1848 he was enabled to return to Prussia, where he was restored to his rights, and received the salary attached to a promised office not yet vacant. He married in 1849, and during the next ten years lived first in Bingerbrück, afterwards in Neuwied, and then in Weimar, where together with Oskar Schade (1826–1906) he edited the Weimarische Jahrbuch (1854–1857).

In 1860 he was appointed librarian to Victor I, Duke of Ratibor at the monasterial castle of Corvey near Höxter on the Weser, where he died in 1874.

== Works ==
Hoffmann von Fallersleben was one of the most popular poets of his time. In politics he ardently sympathized with progressive tendencies, and he was among the earliest and most effective of the political poets who paved the way for the revolution of 1848. As a poet, however, he acquired distinction chiefly by the ease, simplicity and grace with which he gave expression to the passions and aspirations of daily life. Although he had not been academically trained in music, he composed melodies for many of his songs, and a considerable number of them are sung by all classes in every part of Germany.

Among the best known is the patriotic "Das Lied der Deutschen" which starts with the words Deutschland, Deutschland über alles and is set to a 1797 tune by Joseph Haydn. The lyrics were written in 1841 on the island of Helgoland, then in British possession. The text of the song expresses the pan-German sentiments common to revolutionary republicans of the period, which were considered inflammatory and treasonous in the German-speaking principalities. The phrase über alles at that time did not refer to militant ideas of conquest of foreign countries, but to the need for loyalty to a united Germany above regional loyalties.

The best of Hoffmann von Fallersleben's poetical writings is his Gedichte ("Poems", 1827), but there is great merit also in his other works:

- Alemannische Lieder ("Alemannic Songs", 1826),
- Soldatenleben ("Soldier's Life", 1852),
- Rheinleben ("Rhine Life", 1865), and in his
- Fünfzig neue Kinderlieder ("Fifty New Children's Songs"), and
- Alte und neue Kinder ("Old and New Children's Songs").

Many of his children's songs are still popular, and are known by nearly every German child, including "Alle Vögel sind schon da", "Ein Männlein steht im Walde", "Summ, summ, summ", "Winters Abschied" ("Winter ade, scheiden tut weh"), "Kuckuck, Kuckuck, ruft's aus dem Wald", "Der Kuckuck und der Esel", "A, a, a, der Winter der ist da", "Der Frühling hat sich eingestellt", and the Christmas song "Morgen kommt der Weihnachtsmann". Other composers, including Amalie Scholl and Pauline Volkstein, set Hoffmann von Fallersleben's text to music.

Hoffmann von Fallersleben's Unpolitische Lieder ("Apolitical songs"), Deutsche Lieder aus der Schweiz ("German Songs from Switzerland") and Streiflichter ("Highlights") are interesting mainly in relation to the movements of the age in which they were written. As a student of ancient Teutonic literature, Hoffmann von Fallersleben ranks among the most persevering and cultivated of German scholars. Some of his findings are embodied in his Horae Belgicae ("Belgian hours"), Fundgruben für Geschichte deutscher Sprache und Literatur ("Sources for the History of German Language and Literature"), Altdeutsche Blätter ("Old German Papers"), and Spenden zur deutschen Literaturgeschichte und Findlinge ("Contributions to German literary history and finds").

His editions of historic works include:

- Reineke Vos,
- Monumenta Elnonensia and
- Theophilus.

Die deutsche Philologie im Grundriss ("Fundamentals of German Philology", 1836) was at the time of its publication a valuable contribution to philological research, and historians of German literature still attach importance to his

- Geschichte des deutschen Kirchenliedes bis auf Luther ("History of the German Church Song up to Luther", 1832; 3rd ed.: 1861);
- Unsere volkstümlichen Lieder ("Our Folk Songs", 3rd ed.: 1869) and
- Die deutschen Gesellschaftslieder des 16. und 17. Jahrh. ("German Society Songs of the 16th and 17th Centuries", 2nd ed.: 1860).

In 1868–1870, Hoffmann published an autobiography in six volumes, Mein Leben: Aufzeichnungen und Erinnerungen ("My Life: Notes and Memories"; abbreviated ed. in 2 vols.: 1894). His Gesammelte Werke ("Collected Works") in 8 volumes were edited by H. Gerstenberg (1891–1894); his Ausgewählte Werke ("Selected Works") in 4 volumes by H. Benzmann (1905). See also Briefe von Hoffmann von Fallersleben und Moritz Haupt an Ferdinand Wolf ("Letters of Hoffmann von Fallersleben and Moritz Haupt to Ferdinand Wolf", 1874); J. M. Wagner, Hoffmann von Fallersleben, 1818–1868 (1869–1870), and R. von Gottschall, Porträts und Studien ("Portraits and Studies", vol. 5, 1876).
