= August Tammekann =

Estonian geographer

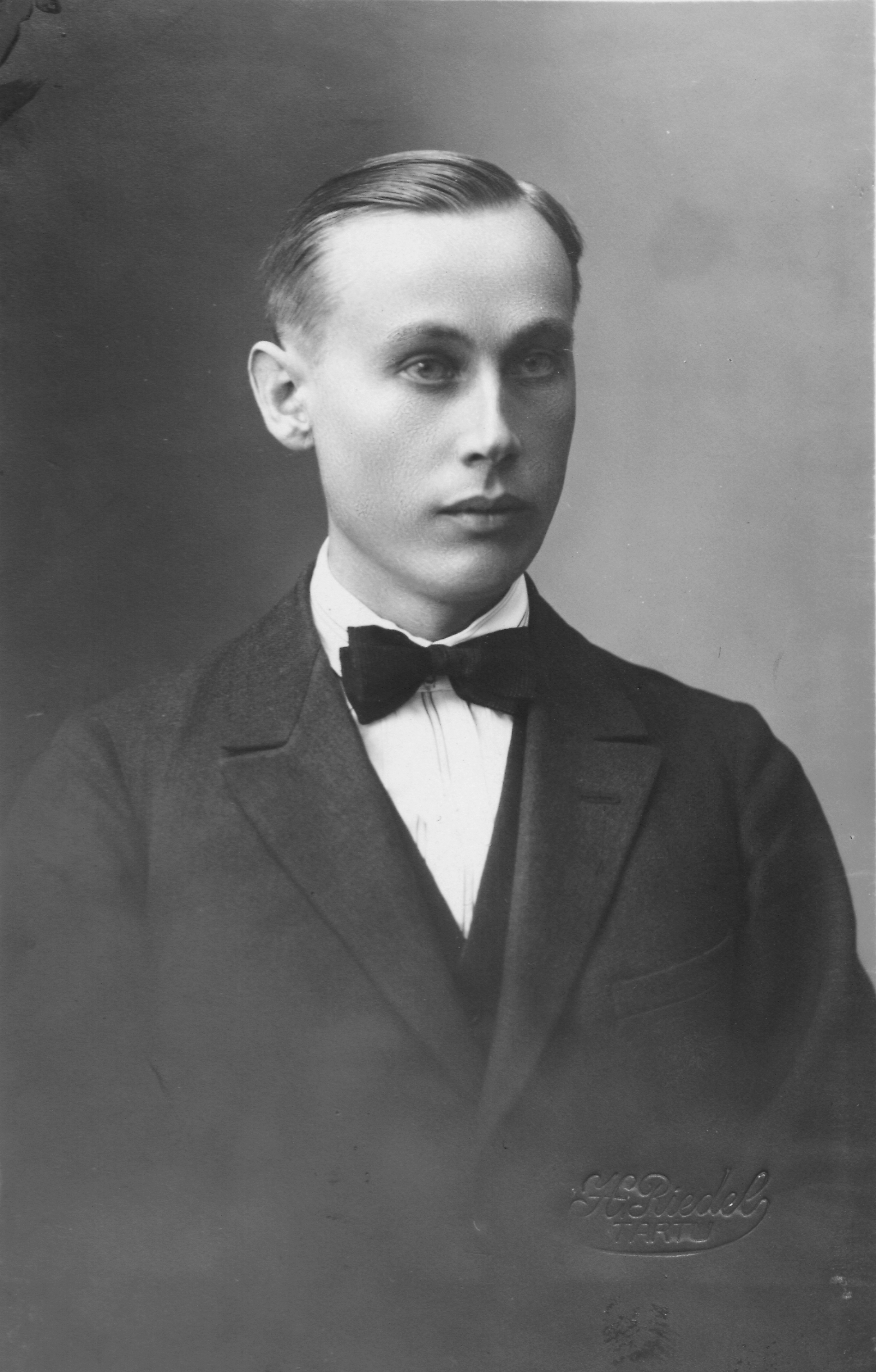
August Tammekann

August Ferdinand Tammekann (until 1921 Jürgenson; 14 September 1894 Tallinn – 23 February 1959 Heinola, Finland) was an Estonian geographer.

In 1923 he graduated from the University of Tartu. He started teaching at the University of Tartu in 1926. During his Tartu years, he lived in Villa Tammekann, designed in 1936 by Alvar Aalto.

In 1940 he fled to Finland and received Finnish citizenship. Between 1942 and 1959 he intermittently worked at the University of Helsinki. He was appointed a professor in 1953.

His main fields of research were Estonian geomorphology, paleogeography, and population distribution. He was also interested in local history.

== Works ==
1926: Die Oberflächengestaltung des nordostestländischen Küstentafellandes: akademische Abhandlung (Helsinki: University of Helsinki)
