= Model 60 stacking stool =

Wooden stool designed by Alvar Aalto

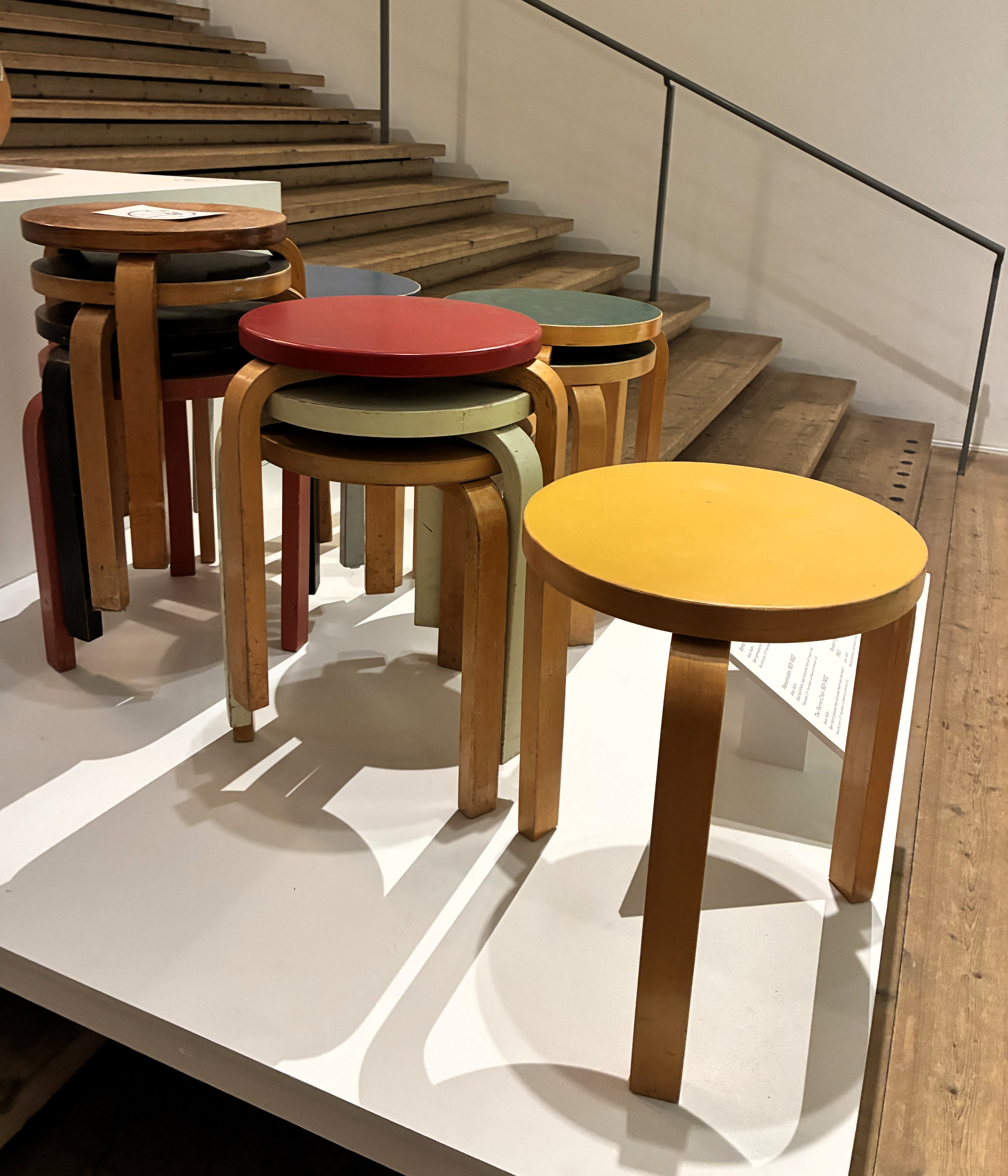
- Designer: Alvar Aalto
- Date: 1933

The Model 60 stacking stool is a wooden stool designed by Finnish designer Alvar Aalto in 1933. Manufactured by Artek, the stool is one of Aalto's most famous furniture designs.

== History ==
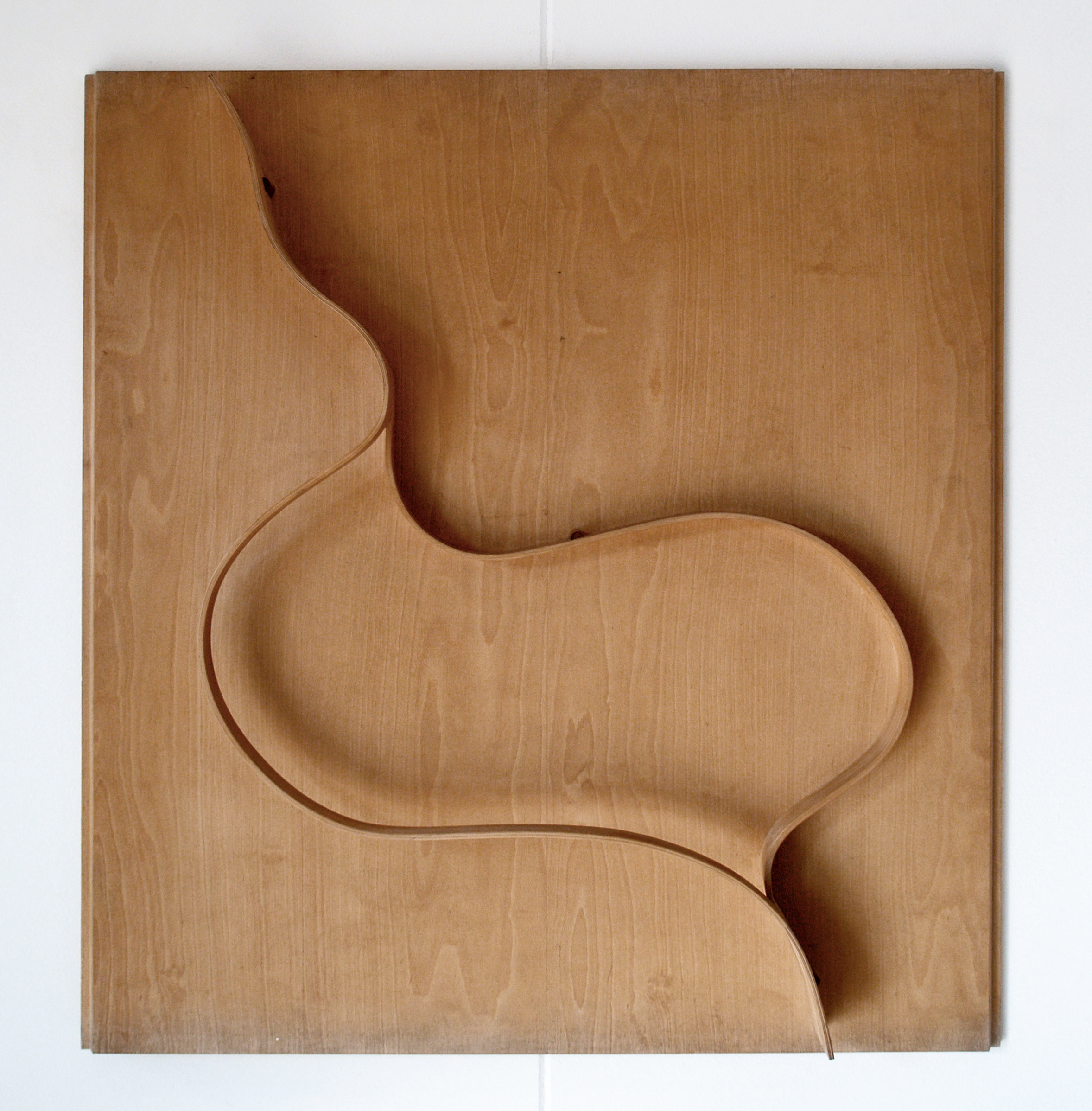
Wood bending experiments

In the early 1930s Aalto undertook a series of experiments in the bending of wood, which ultimately culminated with his development of a bent wooden chair leg that could be manufactured en masse and did not require joinery. Aalto used the chair leg, named the "L leg" in his 1933 design for the model 60 stool, which was intended for use in the Vyborg Library. Aalto notoriously tested the durability of his design by repeatedly throwing a prototype of the stool against the ground.

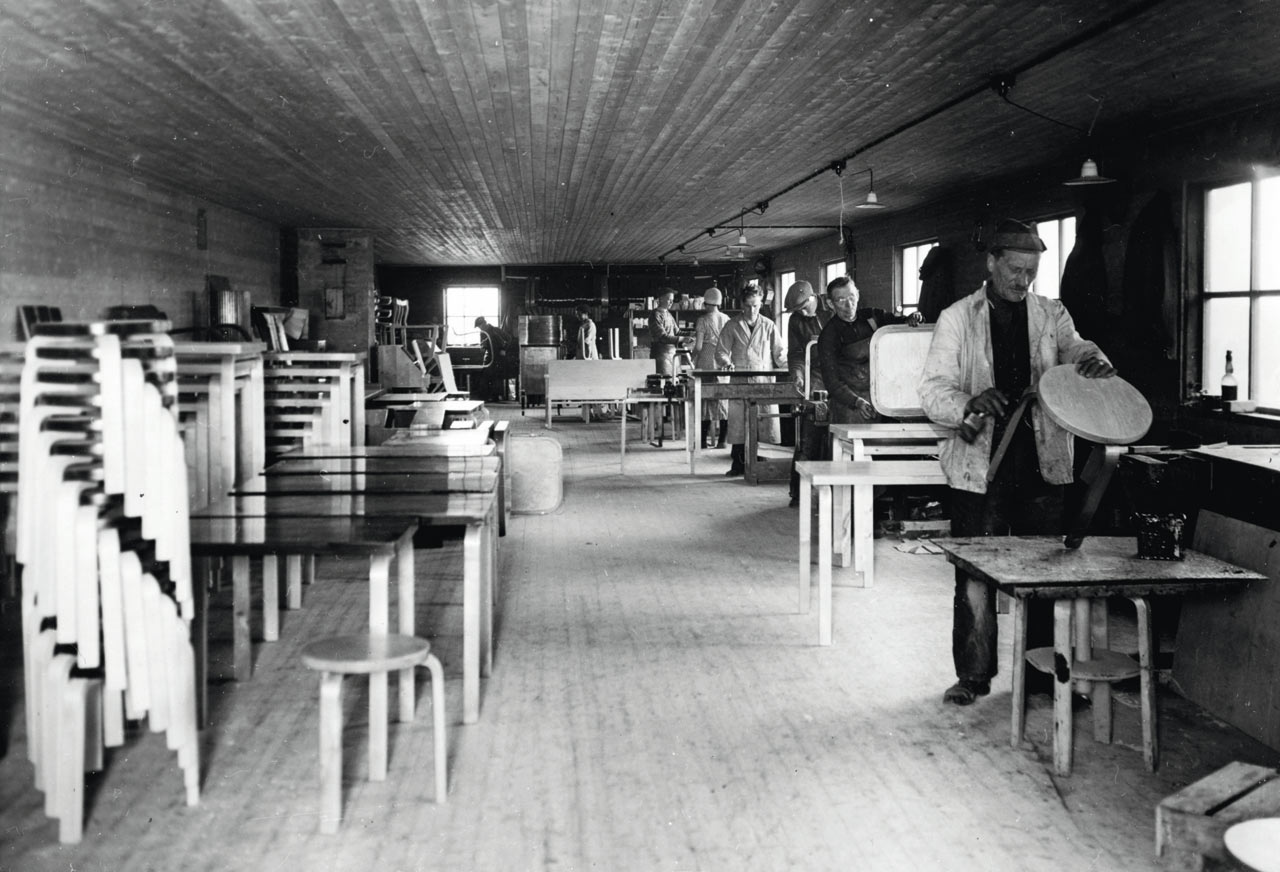
Production of the stool in 1937

The design was first presented to the public in November 1933 at a Finnish design exhibition titled Wood Only at Fortnum & Mason in London. The stool has been in continuous production since its initial release in 1933.

A 1933 model of the stool was added to the permanent collection of MoMA in 1958.

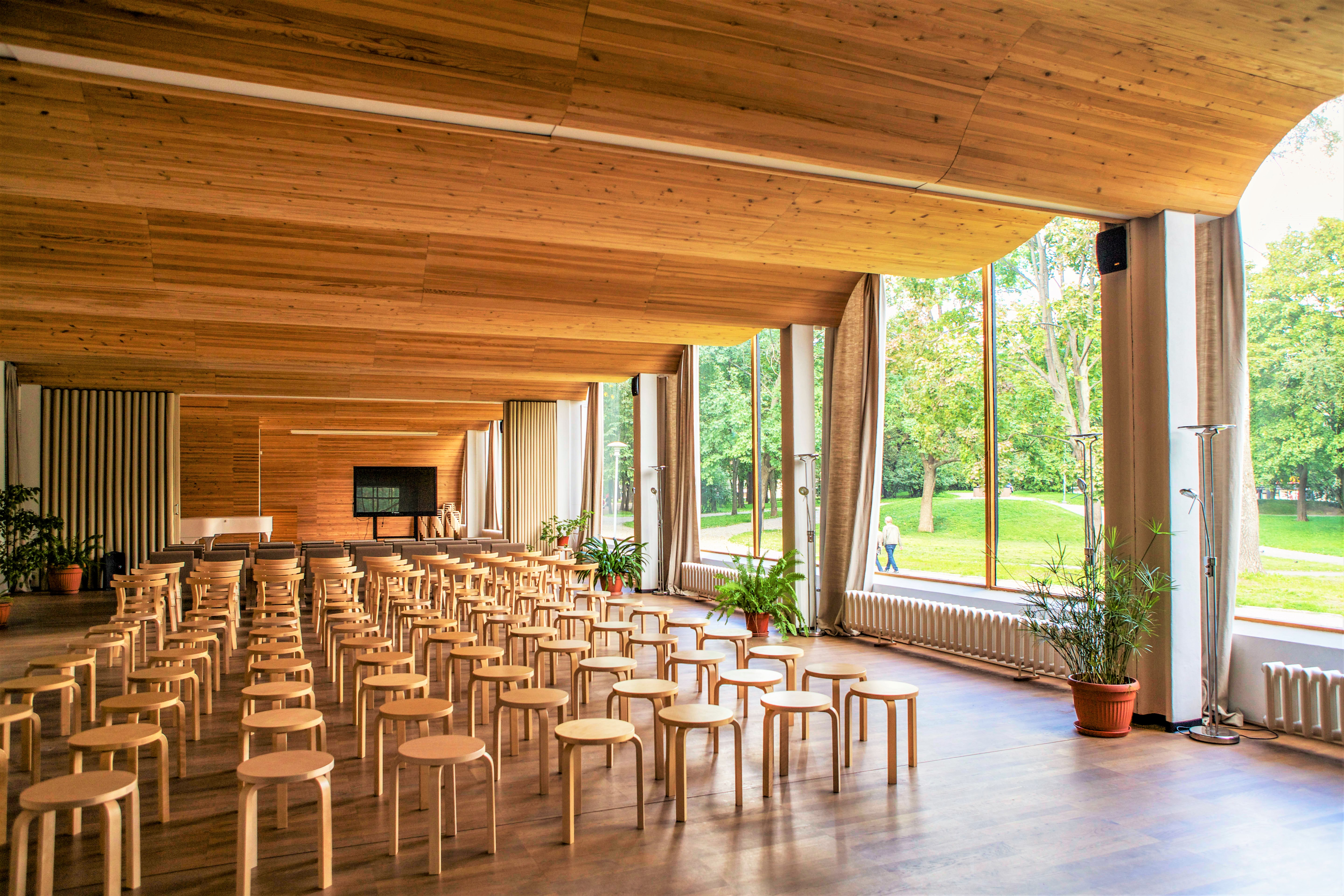
Aalto's Vyborg Library with stools

== Later editions ==
In 2017, streetwear brand Supreme released a limited-edition version of the stool featuring a checkerboard pattern and red logo on the seat.
