= Jyväskylä Defence Corps Building =

Alvar Aalto building in Jyväskylä, Finland

- Jyväskylän Suojeluskuntatalo
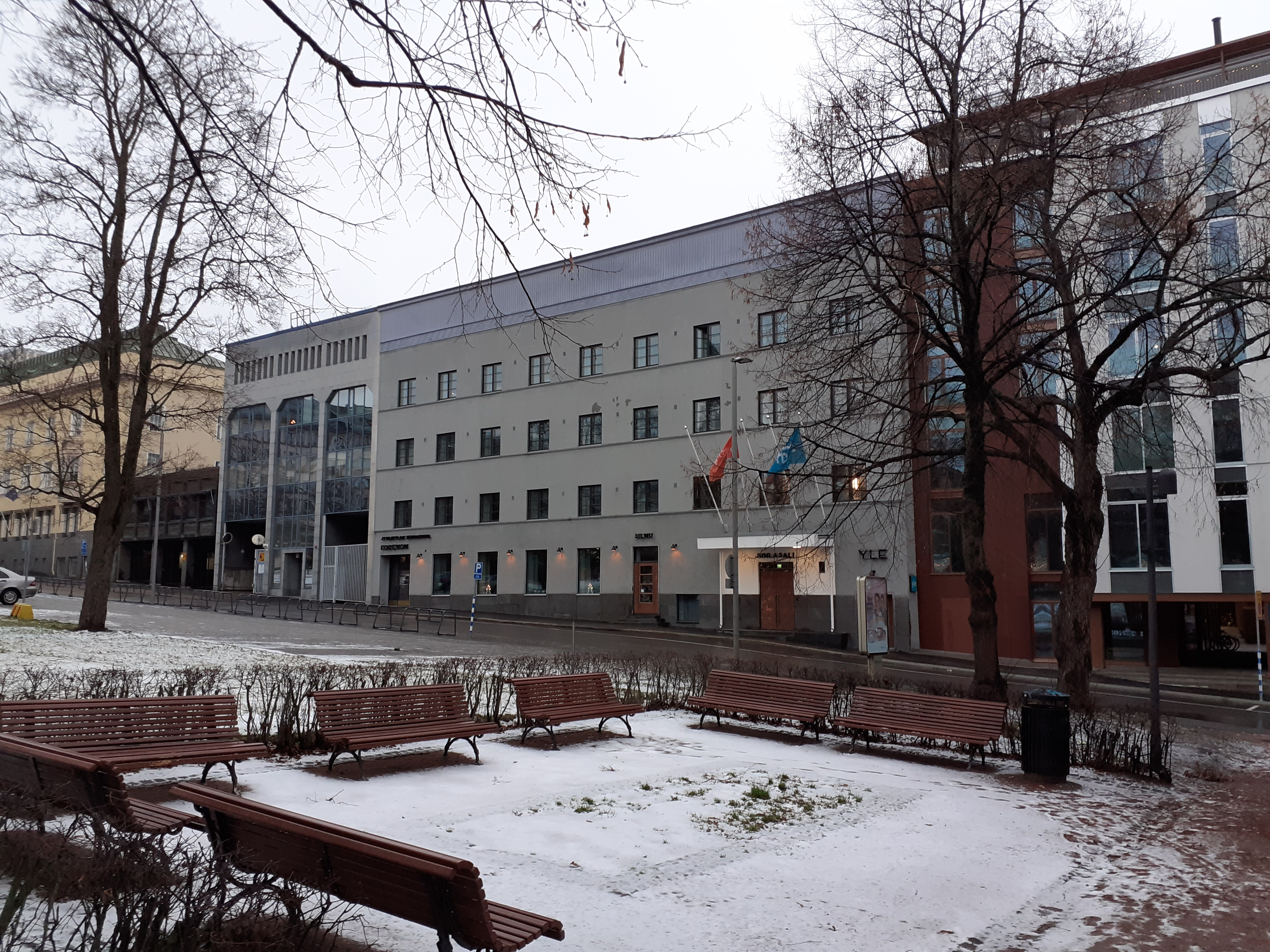
- The Defence Corps Building in 2020, after renovation
- Interactive map of the Jyväskylä Defence Corps Building area
- Alternative names: Valtiontalo

General information
- Type: Mixed-use (original); Office (interim); Residential (current)
- Architectural style: Nordic Neo-classicism / Functionalism
- Location: Jyväskylä, Finland, Kilpisenkatu 8; 40100 Jyväskylä
- Coordinates: 62.2411°N 25.7466°E
- Construction started: 1926
- Completed: 1929
- Renovated: 1967, 2020
- Owner: Järvi-Suomen Asunnot; Royal House

Design and construction
- Architect: Alvar Aalto

The Defence Corps Building (Finnish: Suojeluskuntatalo), also known as the Government Building (Finnish: Valtiontalo), is a public building located in central Jyväskylä, Finland, designed by the Finnish architect Alvar Aalto, and completed in 1929.

== Background ==
To commission a new headquarters in Jyväskylä, the Defence Corps or Civil Guard (Suojeluskunta) organisation held in 1925 an architectural contest. Although Aalto's design Intra Muros only finished second, the commissioning committee nevertheless chose it as the basis for their new building.

However, the Defence Corps only possessed the building for five years, and in 1934 it was acquired by the Finnish state, and has since then most commonly been referred to as Valtiontalo (lit. 'State House', or 'Government Building').

== Architecture ==
The building is notable as one of Aalto's earlier major designs from when he was aged only 28 and still making his name. Stylistically, it reflects a transition away from the Nordic Classicism still popular in the 1920s, and towards the more modern Functionalism which came to dominate much of the 1930s and early 1940s. It is one of the most important surviving examples of late Nordic Classicism.

The building's interior, in particular, marks a departure from the rigid lines of neo-classicism, employing more fluid and flexible shapes and spaces, as well as lighter and more functional materials. The interior light fittings comprise the Danish Poul Henningsen's contemporary, now iconic three-shade designs. The flooring materials include the Mettlach tiles of Villeroy & Boch, a rarity in Finland at the time.

Originally the building was designed as a mixed-use, multi-tenant complex, housing a cinema, restaurants, retail and banking facilities, sporting venues, as well as the assembly hall and other functions of the Defence Corps. The building has, however, been extensively altered and renovated over the years, and its layout has been changed considerably from the original design. The most significant alternations were carried out in the late 1960s, when parts of the building were taken over by the post office, with much of the remainder converted into office use.

Since the 1990s, the building has been designated and protected as part of the Jyväskylä administrative quarter by the Finnish Heritage Agency as a nationally important built cultural environment (Valtakunnallisesti merkittävä rakennettu kulttuuriympäristö).

== Recent developments ==
In 1995, the City of Jyväskylä acquired the property with the plans of converting it first to law courts, and later to music and cultural venues, but in the end ended up not utilising it; the building fell into significant structural and aesthetic disrepair, so much so that by 2007, it had been declared a safety hazard, and the cost of renovation was estimated at €8.5 million. It was instead disposed of and sold in 2011 to a property development company for the remarkably low sum of €207,000, but due to extended legal disputes over the low sale price the sale was eventually cancelled.

In 2015, the building was sold to a residential property developer for €700,000. Starting in 2017, the building was comprehensively renovated, as well as extended with attached new-build properties. The renovation was completed in late 2020.
