= Villa Tammekann =

Alvar Aalto-designed house in Estonia

- Interactive map of the Villa Tammekann area

General information
- Type: Residential
- Architectural style: Functionalism, Modern architecture
- Location: Kreutzwaldi 6, Tähtvere, Tartu, Tartu, Estonia
- Coordinates: 58.3845°N 26.7047°E
- Current tenants: Granö Centre
- Named for: Tammekann family
- Completed: 1932
- Renovated: 1999-2000
- Owner: Turku University Foundation

Technical details
- Material: Brick, plaster
- Floor area: 300 square metres (3,200 sq ft)

Design and construction
- Architect: Alvar Aalto

Renovating team
- Architect: Tapani Mustonen
- Awards: Europa Nostra Award

Website
- www.villatammekann.fi/en/

Villa Tammekann is a residential building located in Tartu, Estonia, notable for being one of few private residences designed by the Finnish architect Alvar Aalto, his first design to be realised outside Finland, and the only one located in Estonia or anywhere in the Baltic states.

== Background ==
The villa was commissioned by the Estonian geographer, Professor August Tammekann, and his Finnish wife, Irene née Pelkonen (m. 1925). The couple had by accident met Aalto in Turku and asked him to design for them "a small home", which he did, according to the clients' detailed instructions.

The project was beset with difficulties. Especially the flat roof proved problematic: despite two attempts to construct it, the roof could not be made fully waterproof, and Mrs Tammekann refused to set foot in the house and is known to have protested heavily to Aalto. For a time, the bank even set a pitched roof as a condition of the mortgage.

There was also an issue related to wall insulation, stemming from Estonian building regulations which required thicker-than-intended walls to be built, with the result that the internal space ended up smaller than intended.

In 1933, Aalto threatened to sue the couple for the non-payment of his fees, more than a year after the building had been completed.

Following the Soviet occupation of the Baltic states in June 1940, the Tammekanns fled to Finland, and their house was nationalised. After the war, it was converted to multi-family use, with changes to and the addition of extra internal walls and other construction features. The property gradually fell into disrepair.

== Current use ==
In 1994, after the restoration of Estonian independence, the house was returned to the Tammekann family. They in turn sold it to the University of Turku (Turku University Foundation) in 1998. Following the sale, the building underwent extensive renovations, led by architect Tapani Mustonen, who specialises in refurbishment of Aalto's architecture, and supervised by the Alvar Aalto Foundation; it was restored to its original design, including removal of the hip roof which had been added in the 1950s.

The building now houses the Granö Centre (:fi), a collaborative venture between the Universities of Turku and Tartu. It provides event, meeting and accommodation facilities, mostly for purposes of promoting bilateral cultural relations between Finland and Estonia, or otherwise connected with the two universities; it is not open to the general public.

The centre is named after the Finnish geographer Johannes Gabriel Granö, who held professorships at both universities in the early part of the 20th century (including teaching the young August Tammekann). His son Olavi Granö, also a geographer, was a driving force between the two universities' collaboration and suggested to Turku University the acquisition of the building.

The Centre was officially opened in 2000 by the President of Estonia, Lennart Meri.

== Design ==
The minimalist, strict, cubic design of the house reflects the ascetic functionalism of the early 20th-century modernism, and gives foretaste of what eventually developed into Aalto's signature style of clean, white surfaces accentuated by light wood. The flat roof, which caused the constructors so much trouble, was an integral part of this.

A central space within the building is the large and spacious living room, with full-length windows overlooking the garden, and the dining room and study/library which interconnect with it.

A notable feature of the house is the living room's open-fire fireplace, which is unusually placed not in the core of the building (as a hearth typically would be), but instead integrated into the external wall below the large windows. This allows the occupants of the room to enjoy both the fireplace and the view at the same time. Although the fireplace was included in the original design, it was only completed as part of the late 1990s renovation.

=== Recognition ===
In 2001, the renovated building was recognised with the Europa Nostra cultural heritage award.

Villa Tammekann has also been included in the Iconic Houses listing of internationally notable architectural designs of the 20th century.
