= Alvar Aalto =

Finnish architect and designer (1898–1976)

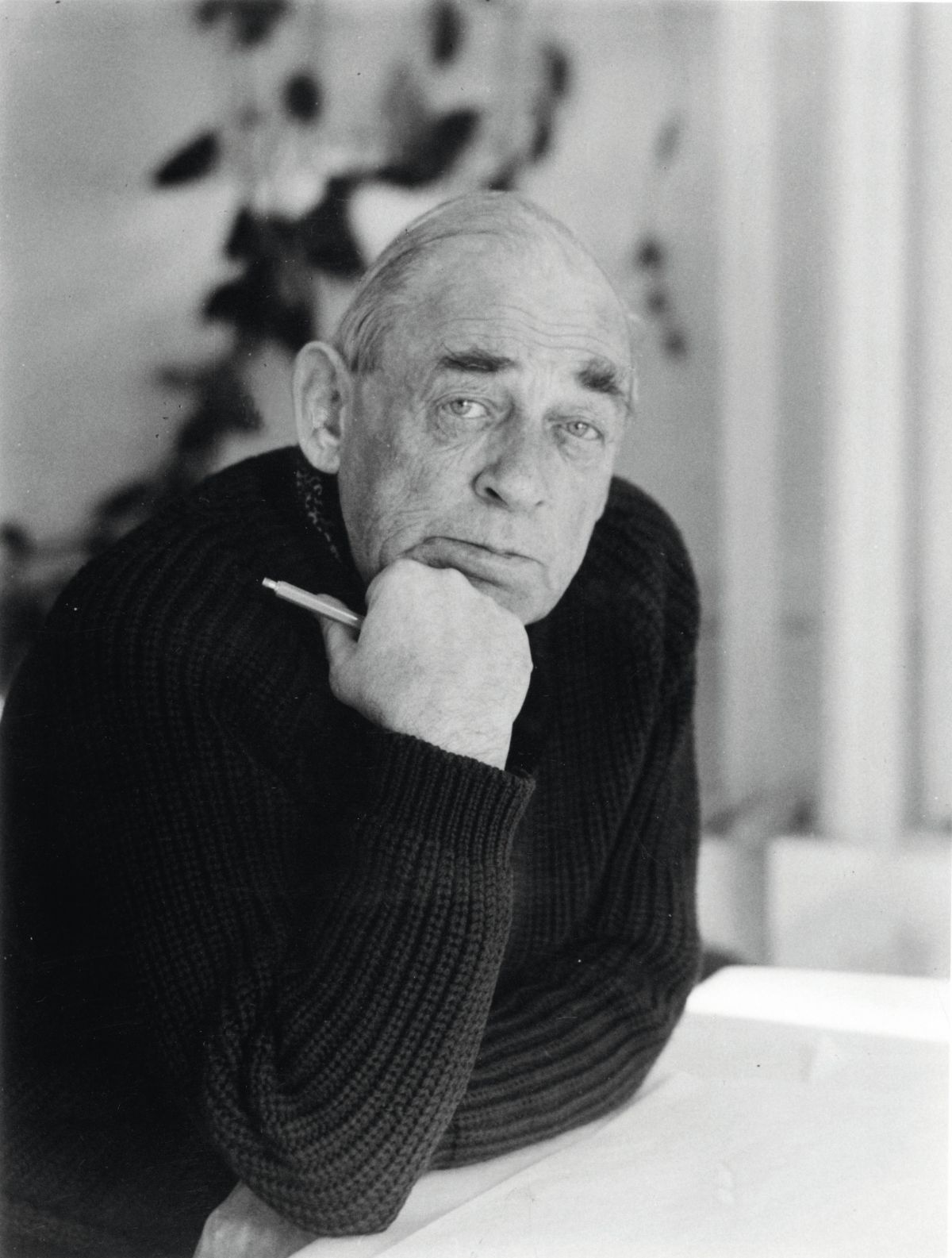
- Aalto in 1960
- Born: Hugo Alvar Henrik Aalto; 3 February 1898; Kuortane, Grand Duchy of Finland, Russian Empire
- Died: 11 May 1976 (aged 78); Helsinki, Finland
- Education: Helsinki University of Technology
- Occupation: Architect
- Spouses: Aino Marsio (m. 1925; died 1949) Elissa Mäkiniemi (m. 1952)
- Children: 2
- Awards: Prince Eugen Medal (1954); RIBA Gold Medal (1957); AIA Gold Medal (1963)
- Buildings: Paimio Sanatorium; Säynätsalo Town Hall; Viipuri Library; Villa Mairea; Baker House; Finlandia Hall
- Projects: Helsinki City Centre
- Design: Savoy Vase; Paimio Chair

Hugo Alvar Henrik Aalto (Finnish: [ˈhuːɡo ˈɑlʋɑr ˈhenrik ˈɑːlto]; 3 February 1898 – 11 May 1976) was a Finnish architect and designer. His work includes architecture, furniture, textiles and glassware, as well as sculptures and paintings. He never regarded himself as an artist, seeing painting and sculpture as "branches of the tree whose trunk is architecture." Aalto's early career ran in parallel with the rapid economic growth and industrialization of Finland during the first half of the 20th century. Many of his clients were industrialists, among them the Ahlström-Gullichsen family, who became his patrons. The span of his career, from the 1920s to the 1970s, is reflected in the styles of his work, ranging from Nordic Classicism of the early work, to a rational International Style Modernism during the 1930s to a more organic modernist style from the 1940s onwards.

His architectural work, throughout his entire career, is characterized by a concern for design as Gesamtkunstwerk—a total work of art in which he, together with his first wife Aino Aalto, would design not only the building but the interior surfaces, furniture, lamps, and glassware as well. His furniture designs are considered Scandinavian Modern, an aesthetic reflected in their elegant simplification and concern for materials, especially wood, but also in Aalto's technical innovations, which led him to receiving patents for various manufacturing processes, such as those used to produce bent wood. As a designer he is celebrated as a forerunner of midcentury modernism in design; his invention of bent plywood furniture had a profound impact on the aesthetics of Charles and Ray Eames and George Nelson. The Alvar Aalto Museum, designed by Aalto himself, is located in what is regarded as his home city, Jyväskylä.

The entry for him on the Museum of Modern Art website notes his "remarkable synthesis of romantic and pragmatic ideas," adding

His work reflects a deep desire to humanize architecture through an unorthodox handling of form and materials that was both rational and intuitive. Influenced by the so-called International Style modernism (or functionalism, as it was called in Finland) and his acquaintance with leading modernists in Europe, including Swedish architect Erik Gunnar Asplund and many of the artists and architects associated with the Bauhaus, Aalto created designs that had a profound impact on the trajectory of modernism before and after World War II.

== Biography ==
=== Life ===
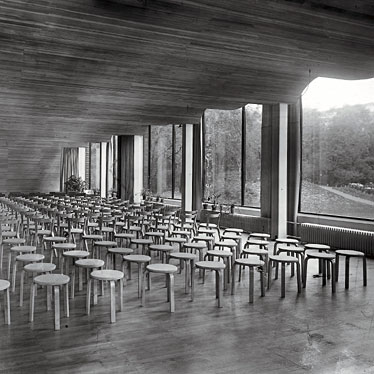
Auditorium of the Viipuri Municipal Library in the 1930s

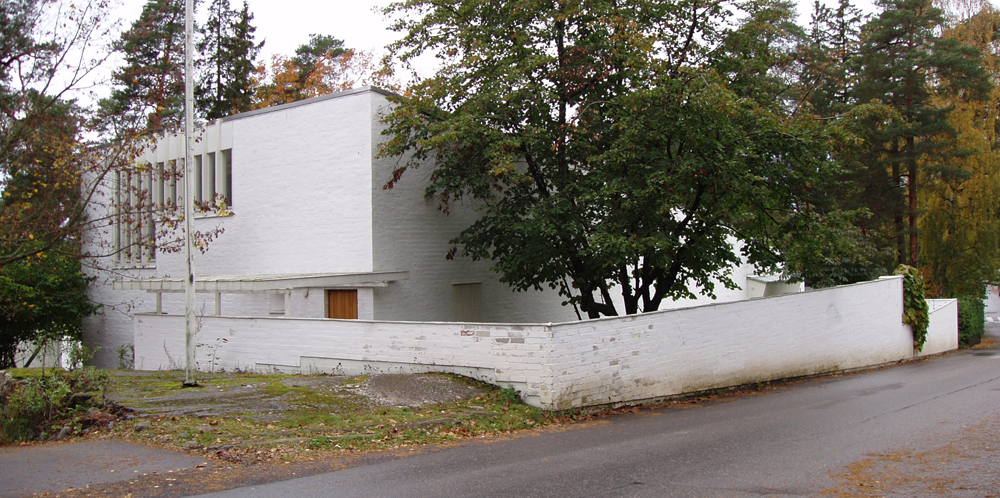
Alvar Aalto Studio, Helsinki (1954–56)

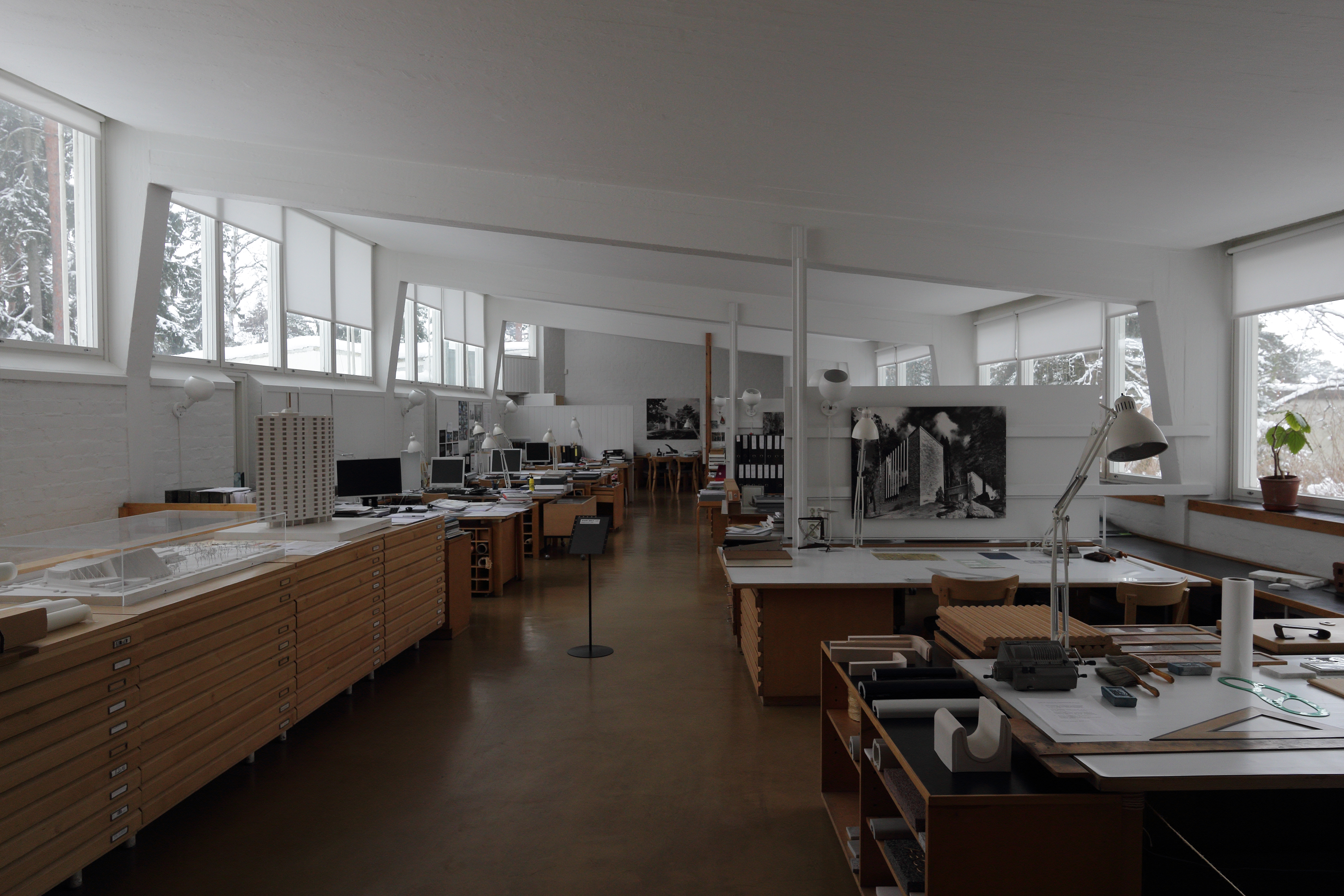
Alvar Aalto Studio, Helsinki (1954–55)

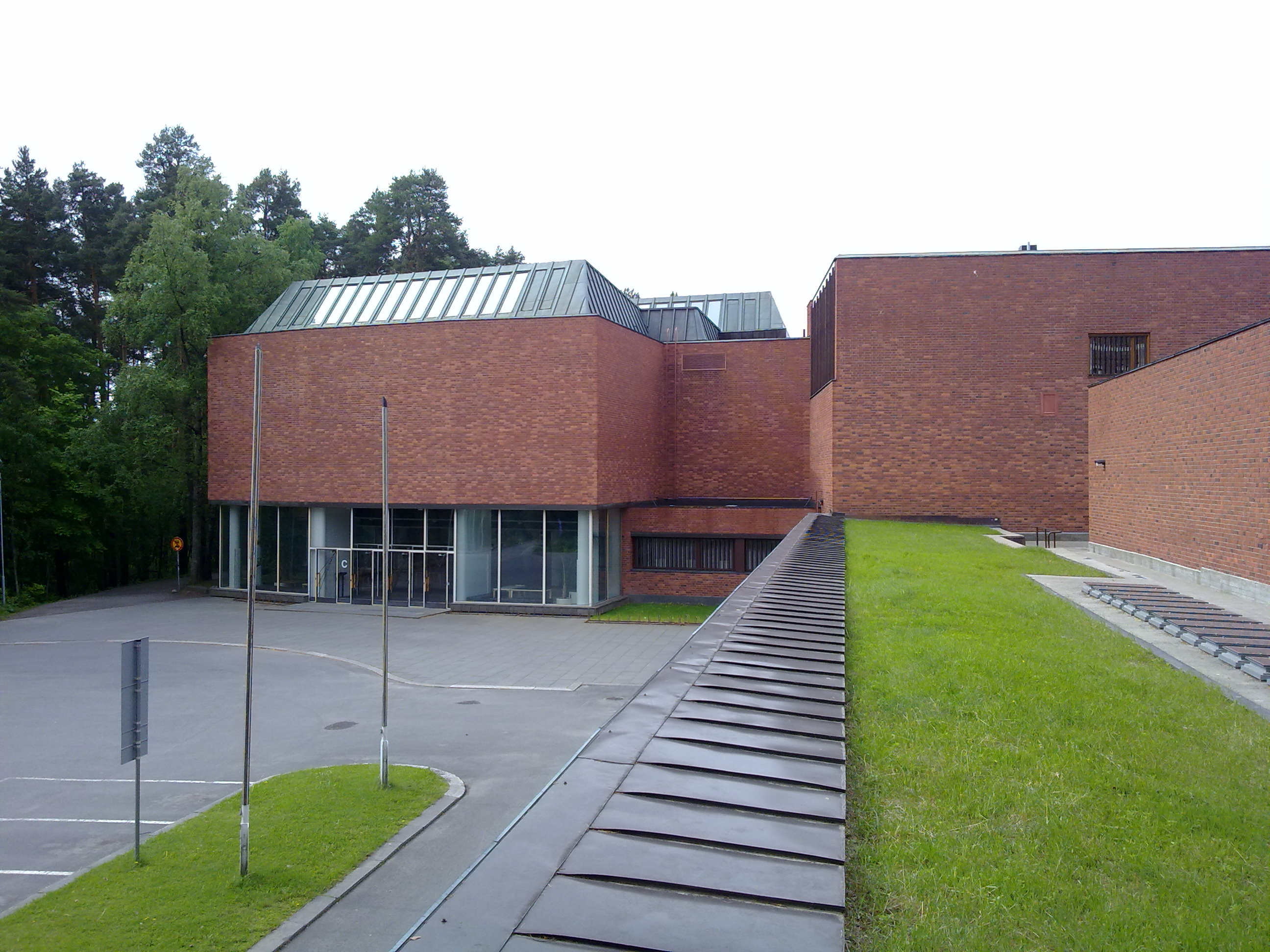
Main Building of the Jyväskylä University (1955)

Church of the Holy Spirit, Wolfsburg (1958–62)

Hugo Alvar Henrik Aalto was born on February 3, 1898, in Kuortane, Finland. His father, Johan Henrik Aalto, was a Finnish-speaking land-surveyor and his mother, Selma Matilda "Selly" (née Hackstedt) was a Swedish-speaking postmistress. When Aalto was 5 years old, the family moved to Alajärvi, and from there to Jyväskylä in Central Finland.

He studied at the Jyväskylä Lyceum school, where he completed his basic education in 1916, and took drawing lessons from local artist Jonas Heiska. In 1916, he then enrolled to study architecture at the Helsinki University of Technology. His studies were interrupted by the Finnish Civil War, in which he fought on the side of the White Army at the Battle of Länkipohja and the Battle of Tampere.

He built his first piece of architecture while a student; a house for his parents at Alajärvi. Later, he continued his education, graduating in 1921. In the summer of 1922 he began military service, finishing at Hamina reserve officer training school, and was promoted to reserve second lieutenant in June 1923.

In 1920, while a student, Aalto made his first trip abroad, travelling via Stockholm to Gothenburg, where he briefly found work with architect Arvid Bjerke. In 1922, he accomplished his first independent piece at the Industrial Exposition in Tampere. In 1923, he returned to Jyväskylä, where he opened an architectural office under the name 'Alvar Aalto, Architect and Monumental Artist'. At that time he wrote articles for the Jyväskylä newspaper Sisä-Suomi under the pseudonym Remus. During this time, he designed a number of small single-family houses in Jyväskylä, and the office's workload steadily increased.

On 6 October 1924, Aalto married architect Aino Marsio. Their honeymoon in Italy was Aalto's first trip there, though Aino had previously made a study trip there. The latter trip together sealed an intellectual bond with the culture of the Mediterranean region that remained important to Aalto for life.

On their return they continued with several local projects, notably the Jyväskylä Worker's Club, which incorporated a number of motifs which they had studied during their trip, most notably the decorations of the Festival hall modelled on the Rucellai Sepulchre in Florence by Leon Battista Alberti. After winning the architecture competition for the Southwest Finland Agricultural Cooperative building in 1927, the Aaltos moved their office to Turku. They had made contact with the city's most progressive architect, Erik Bryggman before moving. They began collaborating with him, most notably on the Turku Fair of 1928–29. Aalto's biographer, Göran Schildt, claimed that Bryggman was the only architect with whom Aalto cooperated as an equal. With an increasing quantity of work in the Finnish capital, the Aaltos' office moved again in 1933 to Helsinki.

The Aaltos designed and built a joint house-office (1935–36) for themselves in Munkkiniemi, Helsinki, but later (1954–56) had a purpose-built office erected in the same neighbourhood – now the former is a "home museum" and the latter the premises of the Alvar Aalto Academy. In 1926, the young Aaltos designed and had built for themselves a summer cottage in Alajärvi, Villa Flora.

Aino and Alvar had two children, a daughter, Johanna "Hanni" (married surname Alanen; born 1925), and a son, Hamilkar Aalto (born 1928). Aino Aalto died of cancer in 1949.

In 1952, Aalto married architect Elissa Mäkiniemi (died 1994). In 1952, he designed and built a summer cottage, the so-called Experimental House, for himself and his second wife, now Elissa Aalto, in Muuratsalo in Central Finland. Alvar Aalto died on 11 May 1976, in Helsinki, and is buried in the Hietaniemi cemetery in Helsinki. Elissa Aalto became the director of the practice, running the office from 1976 to 1994. In 1978, the Museum of Finnish Architecture in Helsinki arranged a major exhibition of Aalto's works.

== Architecture career ==
=== Early career: classicism ===
Although he is sometimes regarded as among the first and most influential architects of Nordic modernism, closer examination reveals that Aalto (while a pioneer in Finland) closely followed and had personal contacts with other pioneers in Sweden, in particular Gunnar Asplund and Sven Markelius. What they and many others of that generation in the Nordic countries shared was a classical education and an approach to classical architecture that historians now call Nordic Classicism. It was a style that had been a reaction to the previous dominant style of National Romanticism before moving, in the late 1920s, towards Modernism.

Upon returning to Jyväskylä in 1923 to establish his own architect's office, Aalto designed several single-family homes designed in the style of Nordic Classicism. For example, the manor-like house for his mother's cousin Terho Manner in Töysa (1923), a summer villa for the Jyväskylä chief constable (also from 1923) and the Alatalo farmhouse in Tarvaala (1924). During this period he completed his first public buildings, the Jyväskylä Workers' Club in 1925, the Jyväskylä Defence Corps Building in 1926 and the Seinäjoki Civil Guard House building in 1924–29. He entered several architectural competitions for prestigious state public buildings, in Finland and abroad. This included two competitions for the Finnish Parliament building in 1923 and 1924, the extension to the University of Helsinki in 1931, and the building to house the League of Nations in Geneva, Switzerland, in 1926–27.

Aalto's first church design to be completed, Muurame church, illustrates his transition from Nordic Classicism to Functionalism.

This was the period when Aalto was most prolific in his writings, with articles for professional journals and newspapers. Among his most well-known essays from this period are "Urban culture" (1924), "Temple baths on Jyväskylä ridge" (1925), "Abbé Coignard's sermon" (1925), and "From doorstep to living room" (1926).

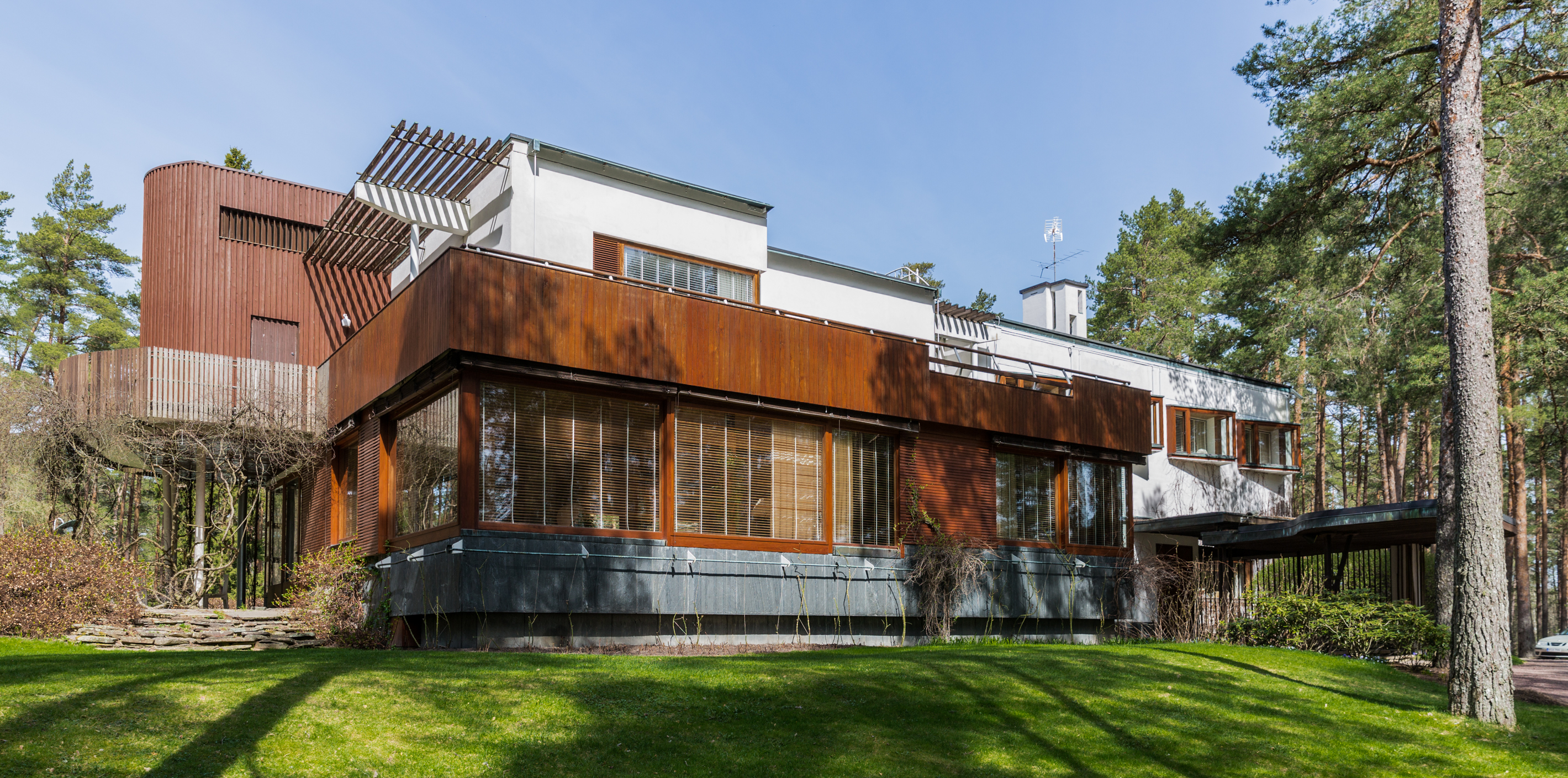
Villa Mairea in Noormarkku

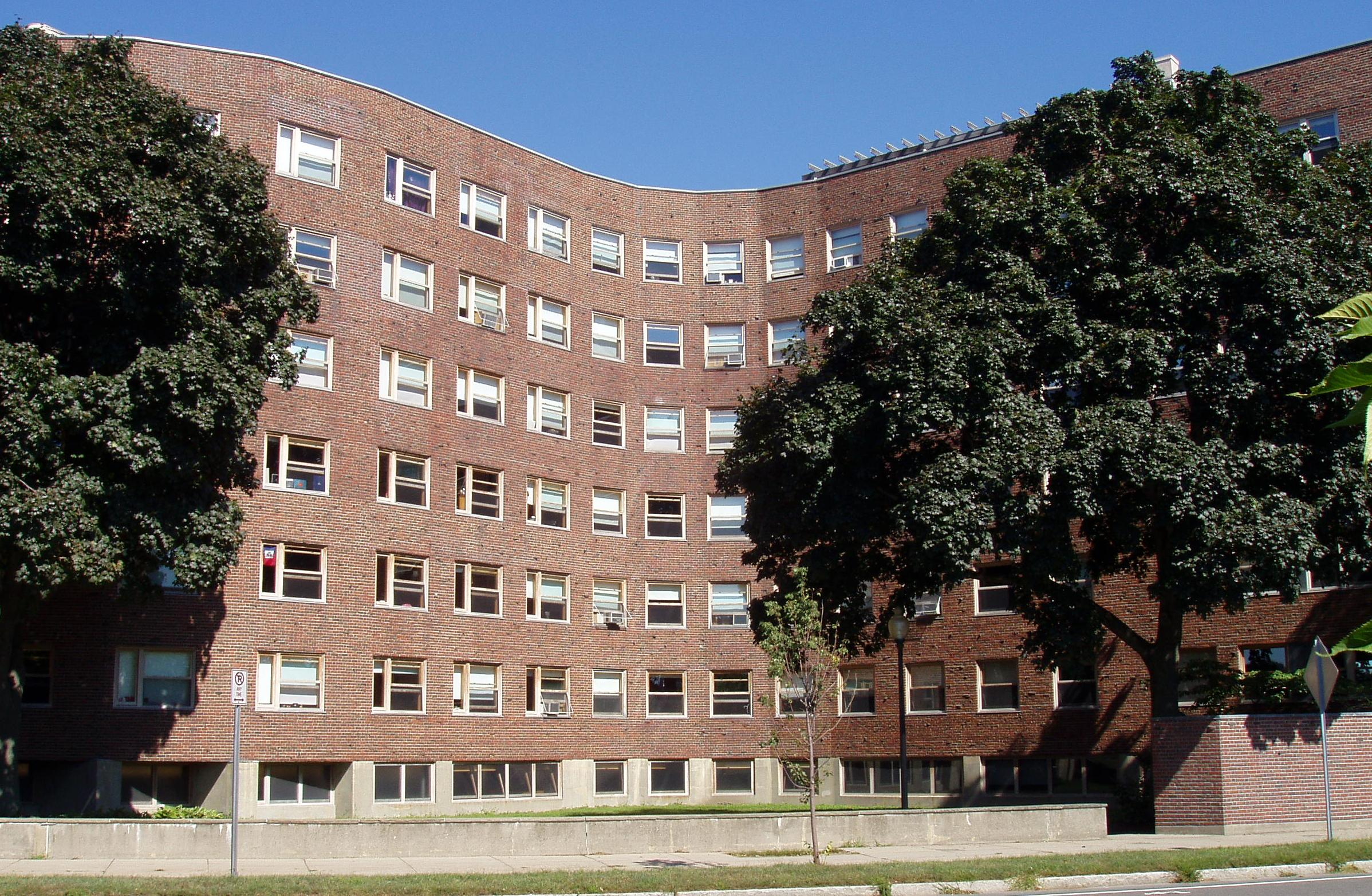
Facade of Baker House on the Charles River

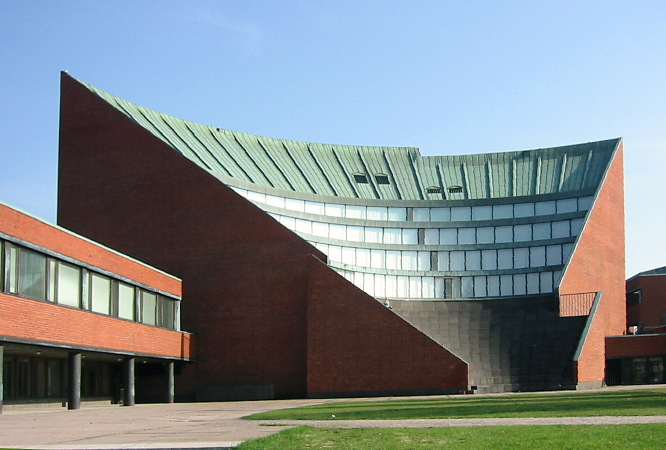
The main auditorium of the Helsinki University of Technology (now Aalto University) in Otaniemi, Finland (1949–66)

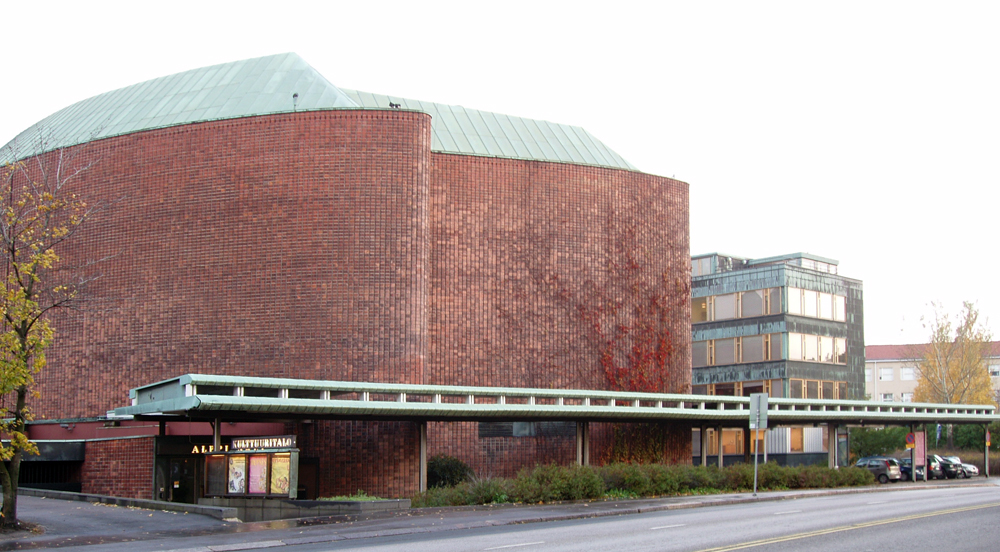
House of Culture, Helsinki

Cultural Center Wolfsburg (1958–62)

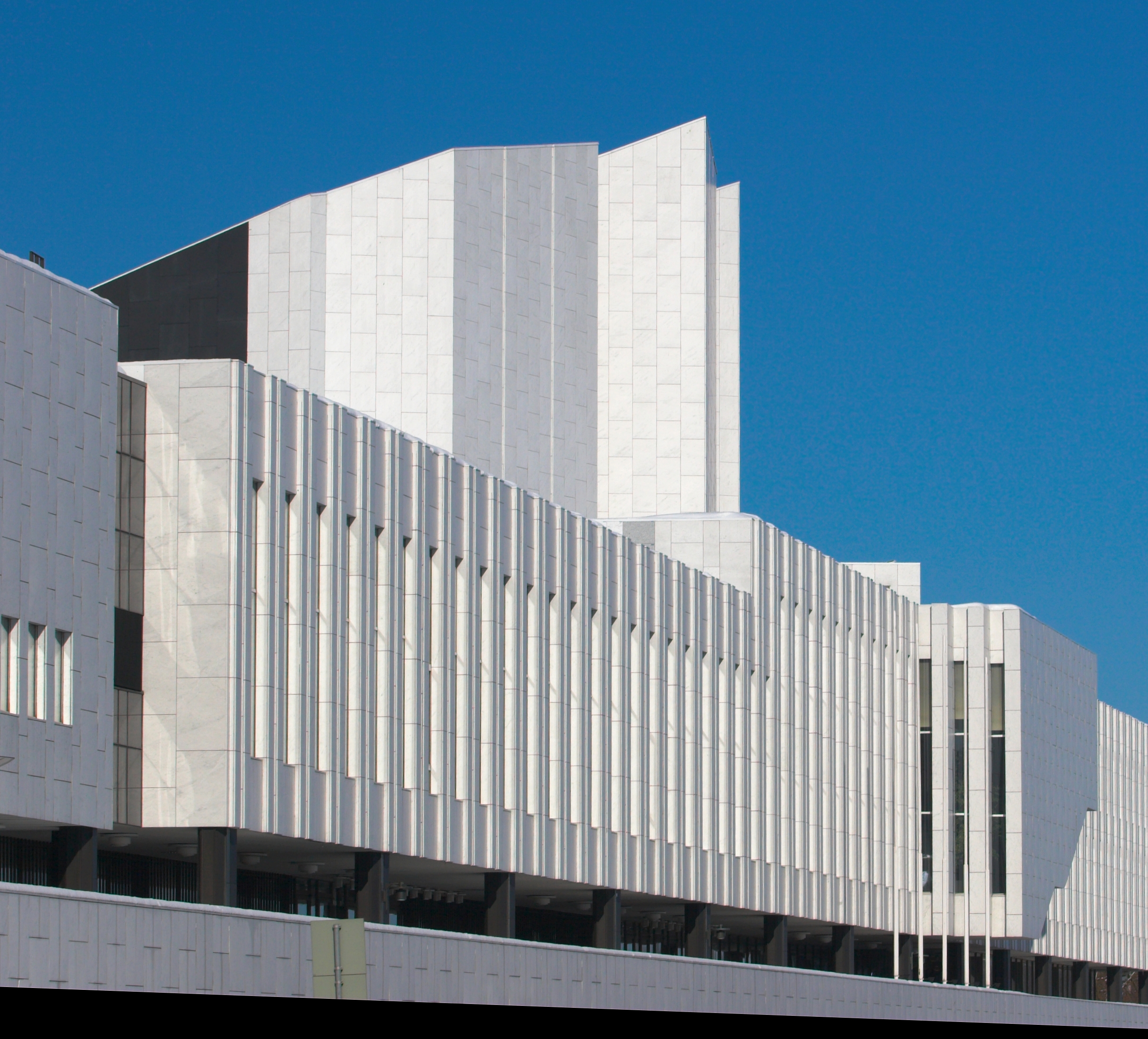
Finlandia Hall (1962–71)

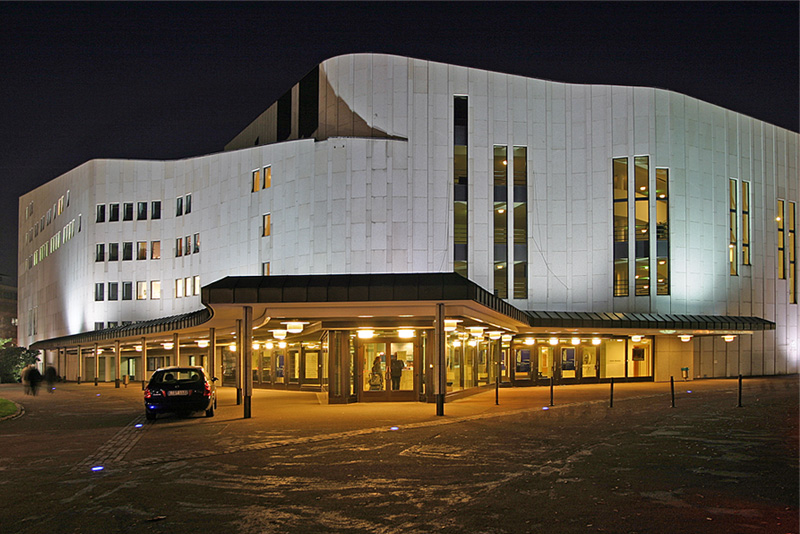
The Aalto-Theater opera house in Essen, Germany

=== Early career: functionalism ===
The shift in Aalto's design approach from classicism to modernism is epitomised by the Viipuri Library in Vyborg (1927–35), which went through a transformation from an originally classical competition entry proposal to the completed high-modernist building. His humanistic approach is in full evidence in the library: the interior displays natural materials, warm colours, and undulating lines. Due to problems related to financing, compounded by a change of site, the Viipuri Library project lasted eight years. During that time, Aalto designed the Standard Apartment Building (1928–29) in Turku, the Turun Sanomat Building (1929–30), and the Paimio Sanatorium (1929–32), which he designed in collaboration with his first wife Aino Aalto. A number of factors contributed to Aalto's shift towards modernism: his increased familiarity with international trends, facilitated by his travels throughout Europe; the opportunity to experiment with concrete prefabrication in the Standard Apartment Building; the cutting-edge Le Corbusier-inspired formal language of the Turun Sanomat Building; and Aalto's application of both in the Paimio Sanatorium and in the ongoing design for the library. Although the Turun Sanomat Building and Paimio Sanatorium are comparatively pure modernist works, they carried the seeds of his questioning of such an orthodox modernist approach and a move to a more daring, synthetic attitude. It has been pointed out that the planning principle for Paimio Sanatorium – the splayed wings – was indebted to the Zonnestraal Sanatorium (1925–31) by Jan Duiker, which Aalto visited while it was under construction. While these early Functionalist bear hallmarks of influences from Le Corbusier, Walter Gropius, and other key modernist figures of central Europe, Aalto nevertheless started to show his individuality in a departure from such norms with the introduction of organic references.

Through Sven Markelius, Aalto became a member of the Congres Internationaux d'Architecture Moderne (CIAM), attending the second congress in Frankfurt in 1929 and the fourth congress in Athens in 1933, where he established a close friendship with László Moholy-Nagy, Sigfried Giedion, and Philip Morton Shand. It was during this time that he closely followed the work of the main force driving the new modernism, Le Corbusier, visiting him in his Paris office several times in the following years.

It was not until the completion of the Paimio Sanatorium (1932) and Viipuri Library (1935) that Aalto first achieved world attention in architecture. His reputation grew in the US following the invitation to hold a retrospective exhibition of his works at MOMA in New York in 1938. (This was his first visit to the States.) The exhibition, which later went on a 12-city tour of the country, was a landmark: Aalto was the second-ever architect – after Le Corbusier – to have a solo exhibition at the museum. His reputation grew in the US following the critical reception of his design for the Finnish Pavilion at the 1939 New York World's Fair, described by Frank Lloyd Wright as a "work of genius". It could be said that Aalto's international reputation was sealed with his inclusion in the second edition of Sigfried Giedion's influential book on Modernist architecture, Space, Time, and Architecture: The growth of a new tradition (1949), in which Aalto received more attention than any other Modernist architect, including Le Corbusier. In his analysis of Aalto, Giedion gave primacy to qualities that depart from direct functionality, such as mood, atmosphere, intensity of life, and even national characteristics, declaring that "Finland is with Aalto wherever he goes."

=== Mid career: experimentation ===
During the 1930s Alvar spent some time experimenting with laminated wood, sculpture and abstract relief, characterized by irregular curved forms. Utilizing this knowledge, he was able to solve technical problems concerning the flexibility of wood while at the same time working out spatial issues in his designs. Aalto's early experiments with wood and his move away from a purist modernism would be tested in built form with the commission to design Villa Mairea (1939) in Noormarkku, the luxury home of young industrialist couple Harry and Maire Gullichsen. It was Maire Gullichsen who acted as the main client, and she worked closely not only with Alvar but also with Aino Aalto on the design, encouraging them to be more daring in their work. The building forms a U-shape around a central inner 'garden' whose central feature is a kidney-shaped swimming pool. Adjacent to the pool is a sauna executed in a rustic style, alluding to both Finnish and Japanese precedents. The design of the house is a synthesis of numerous stylistic influences, from traditional Finnish vernacular to purist modernism, as well as influences from English and Japanese architecture. While the house is clearly intended for a wealthy family, Aalto nevertheless argued that it was also an experiment that would prove useful in the design of mass housing.

His increased fame led to offers and commissions outside Finland. In 1941, he accepted an invitation as a visiting professor to the Massachusetts Institute of Technology in the US. During the Second World War, he returned to Finland to direct the Reconstruction Office. After the war, he returned to MIT, where he designed the student dormitory Baker House, completed in 1949. The dormitory flanked the Charles River, and its undulating form provided maximum view and ventilation for each resident. This was the first building of Aalto's redbrick period. Originally used in Baker House to signify the Ivy League university tradition, Aalto went on to use it in a number of key buildings after his return to Finland, most notably in several of the buildings in the new Helsinki University of Technology campus (starting in 1950), Säynätsalo Town Hall (1952), Helsinki Pensions Institute (1954), Helsinki House of Culture (1958), as well as in his own summer house, the Experimental House in Muuratsalo (1957).

In the 1950s Aalto immersed himself in sculpting, exploring wood, bronze, marble, and mixed media. Among the notable works from this period is his 1960 memorial to the Battle of Suomussalmi. Located on the battlefield, it consists of a leaning bronze pillar on a pedestal.

=== Mature career: monumentalism ===
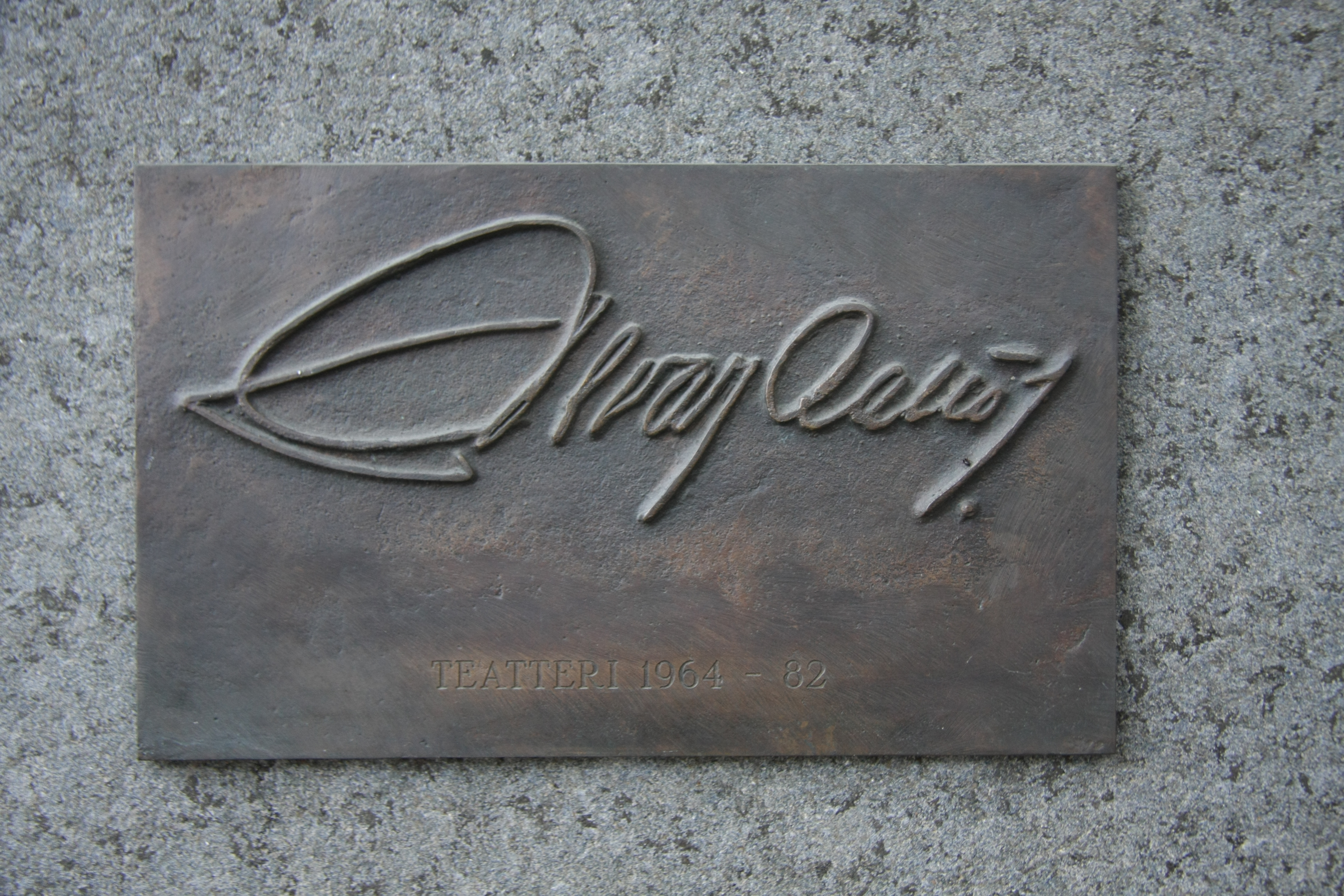
Alvar Aalto's signature on the wall of the Jyväskylä theatre

Foremost among Aalto's work from the early 1960s until his death in 1976 were his projects in Helsinki, in particular the huge town plan for the void in the centre of Helsinki adjacent to Töölö Bay and the vast railway yards, an area marked on the edges by significant buildings such as the National Museum and the main railway station, both by Eliel Saarinen. In his town plan, Aalto proposed a line of separate marble-clad buildings fronting the bay, which would house various cultural institutions, including a concert hall, opera, museum of architecture, and headquarters for the Finnish Academy. The scheme also extended into the Kamppi district with a series of tall office blocks. Aalto first presented his vision in 1961, but it went through various modifications during the early '60s. Only two fragments of the overall plan were realized: the Finlandia Hall concert hall (1976) fronting on Töölö Bay and an office building in the Kamppi district for the Helsinki Electricity Company (1975). Aalto also employed the Miesian formal language of geometric grids used in those buildings for other sites in Helsinki, including the Enso-Gutzeit headquarters building (1962), the Academic Bookstore (1962), and the SYP Bank building (1969).

Following Aalto's death in 1976, his office continued to operate under the direction of his widow Elissa, who oversaw the completion of works already designed (to some extent), among them the Jyväskylä City Theatre and Essen opera house. Since the death of Elissa Aalto, the office has continued to operate as the Alvar Aalto Academy, giving advice on the restoration of Aalto buildings and organizing the practice's vast archives.

== Furniture career ==
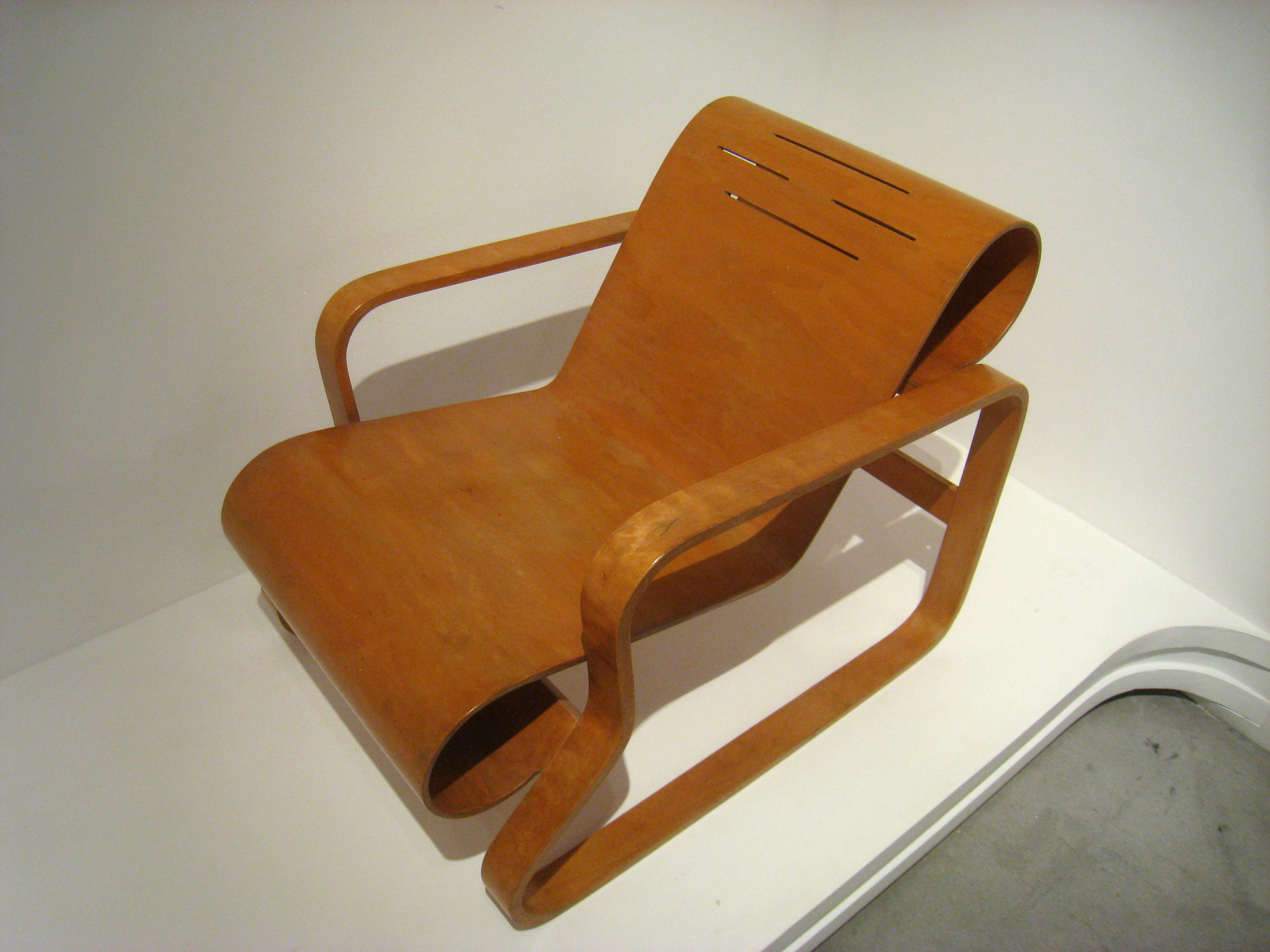
Paimio chair

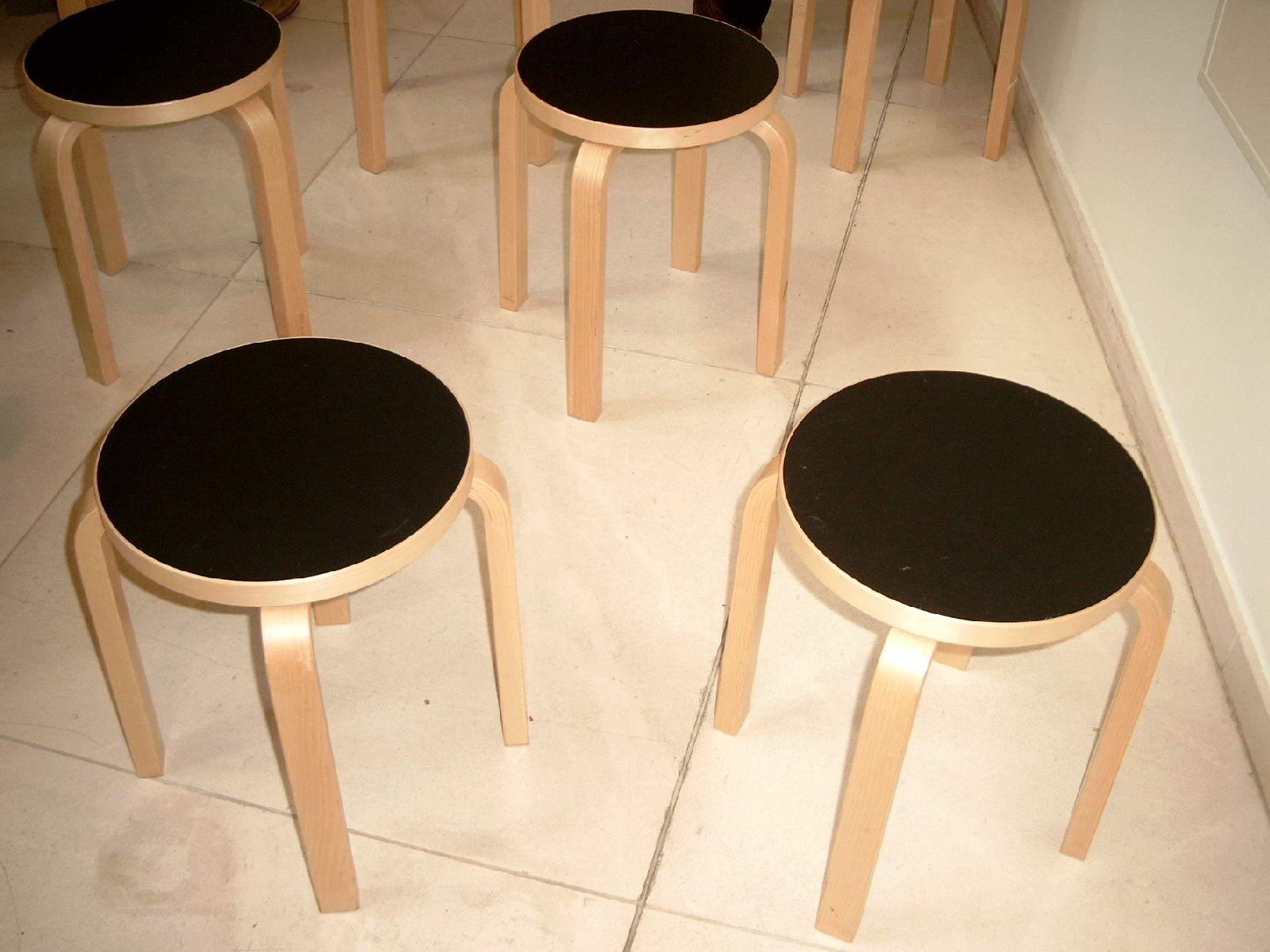
Model 60 stacking stools

Although Aalto was famous for his architecture, his furniture designs were admired and are still popular today. He studied with the architect-designer Josef Hoffmann at the Wiener Werkstätte(engl.: "Vienna Workshop") and worked, for a time, under Eliel Saarinen. He also drew inspiration from Gebrüder Thonet. During the late 1920s and 1930s, he worked closely with Aino Aalto on his furniture designs, a focus due in part to his decision to design many of the individual furniture pieces and lamps for the Paimio Sanatorium. Of particular significance was the Aaltos' experimentation in bent plywood chairs, most notably the so-called Paimio chair, designed for tuberculosis patients, and the Model 60 stacking stool. The Aaltos, together with visual arts promoter Maire Gullichsen and art historian Nils-Gustav Hahl, founded the Artek company in 1935, ostensibly to sell Aalto products but which also imported pieces by other designers. Aalto became the first furniture designer to use the cantilever principle in chair designs using wood.

== Awards ==
Aalto's awards included Honorary Royal Designer for Industry from the Royal Society of Arts in 1947, the Prince Eugen Medal in 1954, the Royal Gold Medal for Architecture from the Royal Institute of British Architects in 1957 and the Gold Medal from the American Institute of Architects in 1963. He was elected a Foreign Honorary Member of the American Academy of Arts and Sciences in 1957. He also was a member of the Academy of Finland, and was its president from 1963 to 1968. From 1925 to 1956 he was a member of the Congrès International d'Architecture Moderne. In 1960 he received an honorary doctorate at the Norwegian University of Science and Technology (NTNU).

== Works ==
Aalto's career spans the changes in style from (Nordic Classicism) to purist International Style Modernism to a more personal, synthetic, and idiosyncratic Modernism. Aalto's wide field of design activity ranges from large-scale projects such as city planning and architecture to more intimate, human-scale work in interior design, furniture and glassware design, and painting. It has been estimated that during his entire career Aalto designed over 500 individual buildings, approximately 300 of which were built. The vast majority of them are in Finland. He also has a few buildings in France, Germany, Italy, and the US.

Aalto's work with wood was influenced by early Scandinavian architects. His experiments and bold departures from aesthetic norms brought attention to his ability to make wood do things not previously done. His techniques in the way he cut beech wood, for example, and his ability to use plywood as a structural element while at the same time exploiting its aesthetic properties, were at once technically innovative and artistically inspired. Other examples of his boundary-pushing sensibility include the vertical placement of rough-hewn logs at his pavilion at the Lapua expo, a design element that evoked a medieval barricade. At the orchestra platform at Turku and the Paris expo at the World Fair, he used varying sizes and shapes of planks. Also at Paris (and at Villa Mairea), he utilized birch boards in a vertical arrangement. His Vyborg Library, built in what was then Viipuri (it became Vyborg after Soviet annexation in 1944), is acclaimed for its stunning ceiling, with its undulating waves of red-hearted pine (which grows in the region ). In his roofing, he created massive spans (155-foot at the covered stadium at Otaniemi), all without tie rods. In his stairway at Villa Mairea, he evokes the feeling of a natural forest by binding beech wood with withes into columns.

Aalto claimed that his paintings were not made as individual artworks but as part of his process of architectural design, and many of his small-scale "sculptural" experiments with wood led to later larger architectural details and forms. These experiments also led to a number of patents: for example, he invented a new form of laminated bent-plywood furniture in 1932 (which was patented in 1933). His experimental method had been influenced by his meetings with various members of the Bauhaus design school, especially László Moholy-Nagy, whom he first met in 1930. Aalto's furniture was exhibited in London in 1935, to great critical acclaim. To cope with the consumer demand, Aalto, together with his wife Aino, Maire Gullichsen, and Nils-Gustav Hahl founded the company Artek that same year. Aalto glassware (Aino as well as Alvar) is manufactured by Iittala.

Aalto's 'High Stool' and 'Stool E60' (manufactured by Artek) are currently used in Apple Stores across the world to serve as seating for customers. Finished in black lacquer, the stools are used to seat customers at the 'Genius Bar' and also in other areas of the store at times when seating is required for a product workshop or special event. Aalto was also influential in bringing modern art to the attention of the Finnish people, in particular the work of his friends Alexander Milne Calder and Fernand Léger.

=== Significant buildings ===
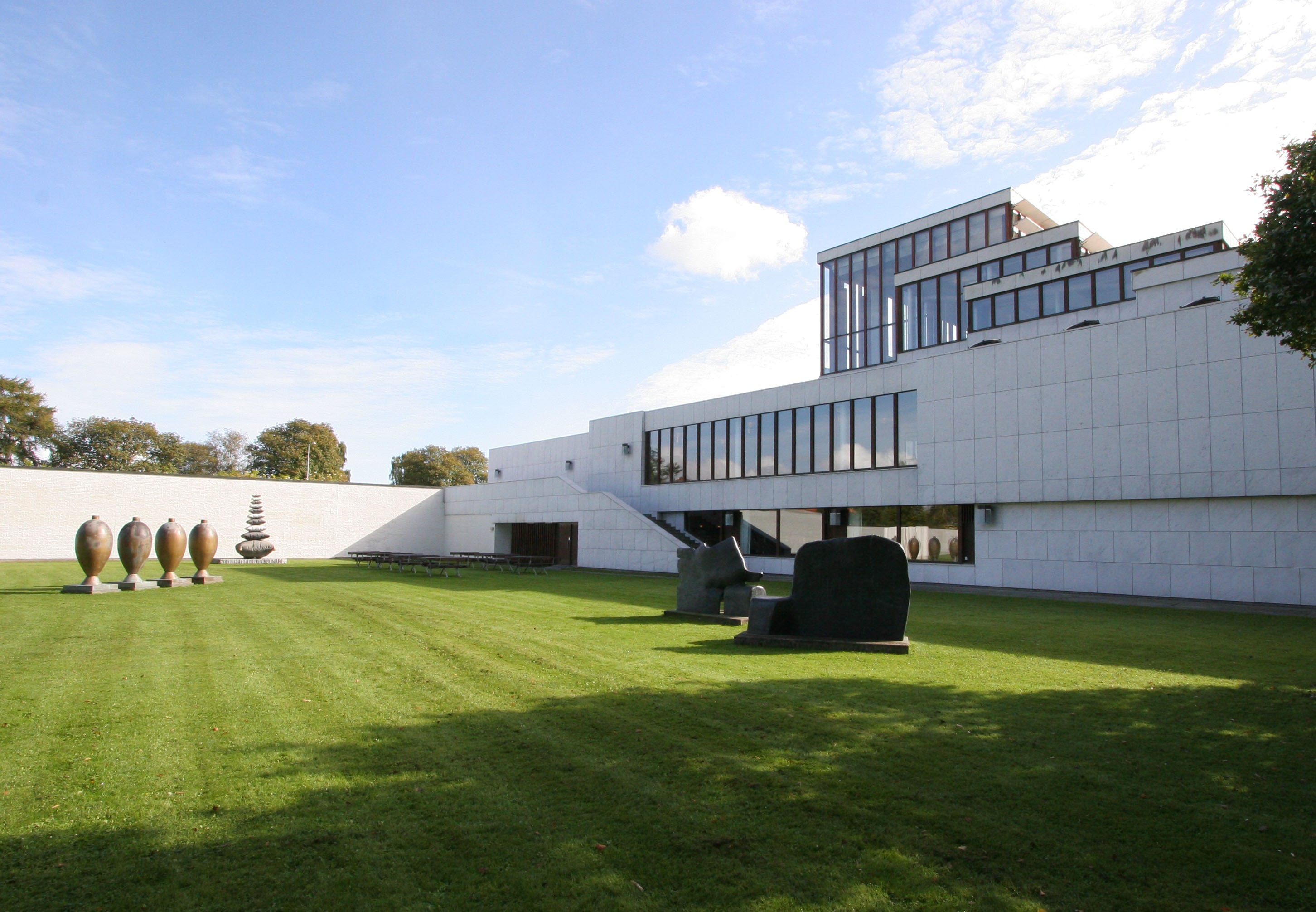
KUNSTEN Museum of Modern Art Aalborg, Denmark (1958–72)

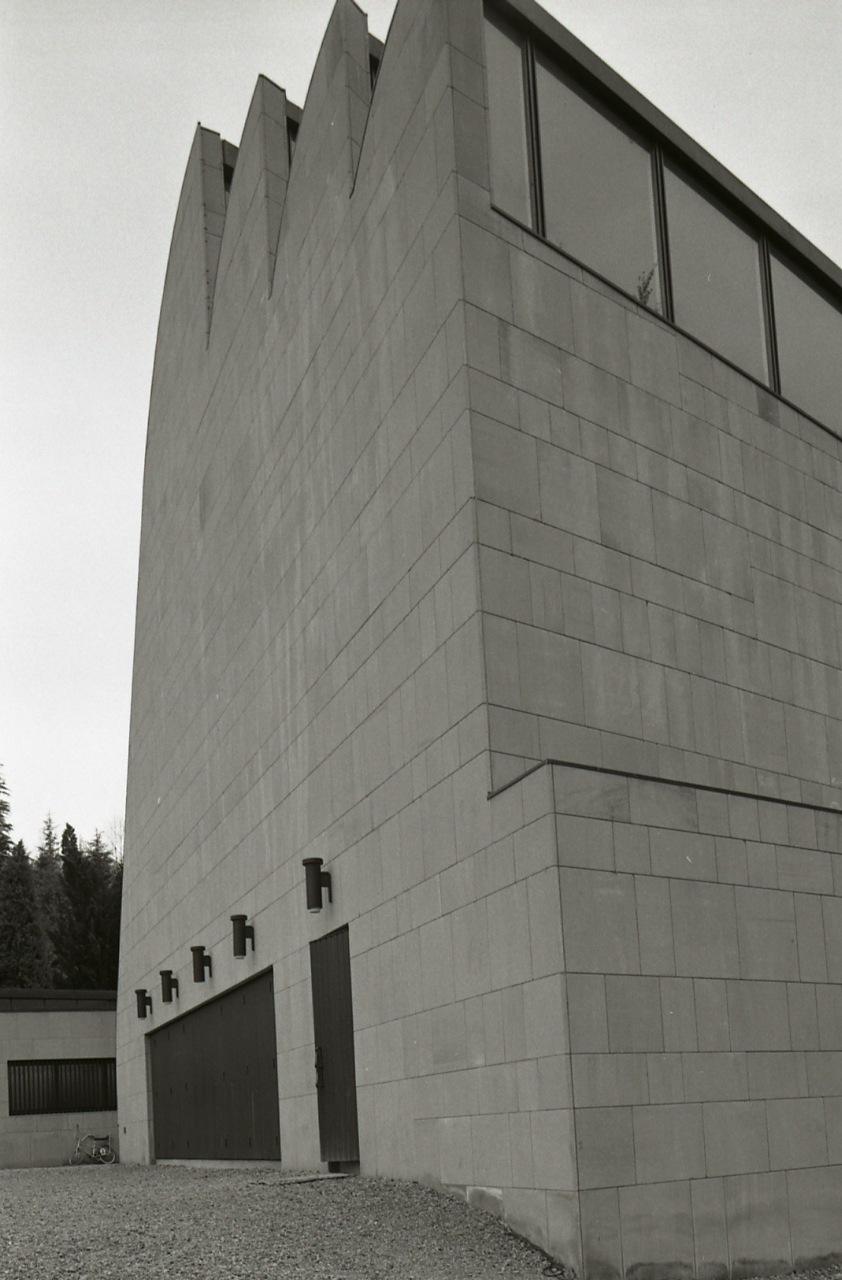
Church of Santa Maria Assunta, Riola of Vergato, Italy, designed in 1966 and built 1975–1978. Photo by Paolo Monti, 1980.

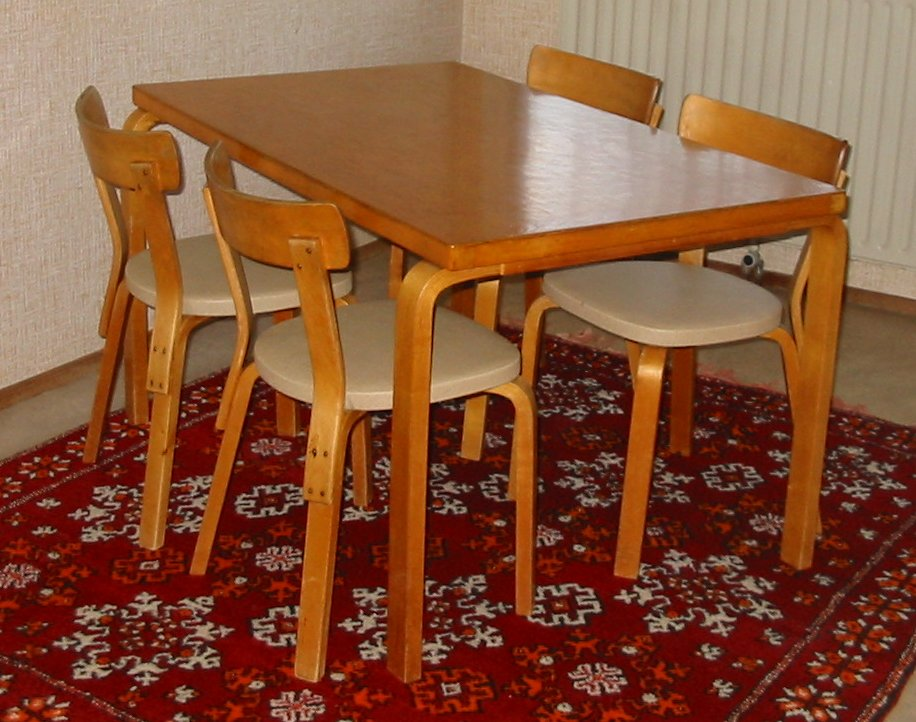
Table and chairs designed by Alvar Aalto

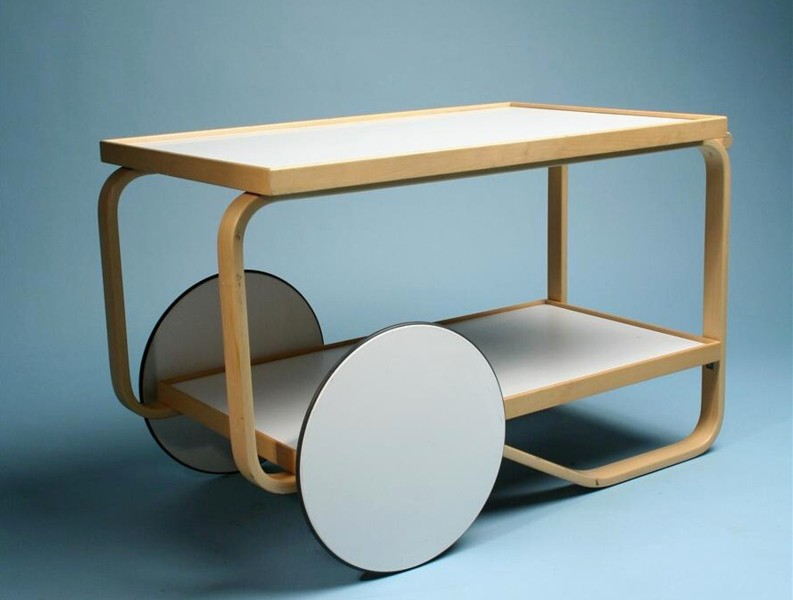
Tea cart (tea trolley)

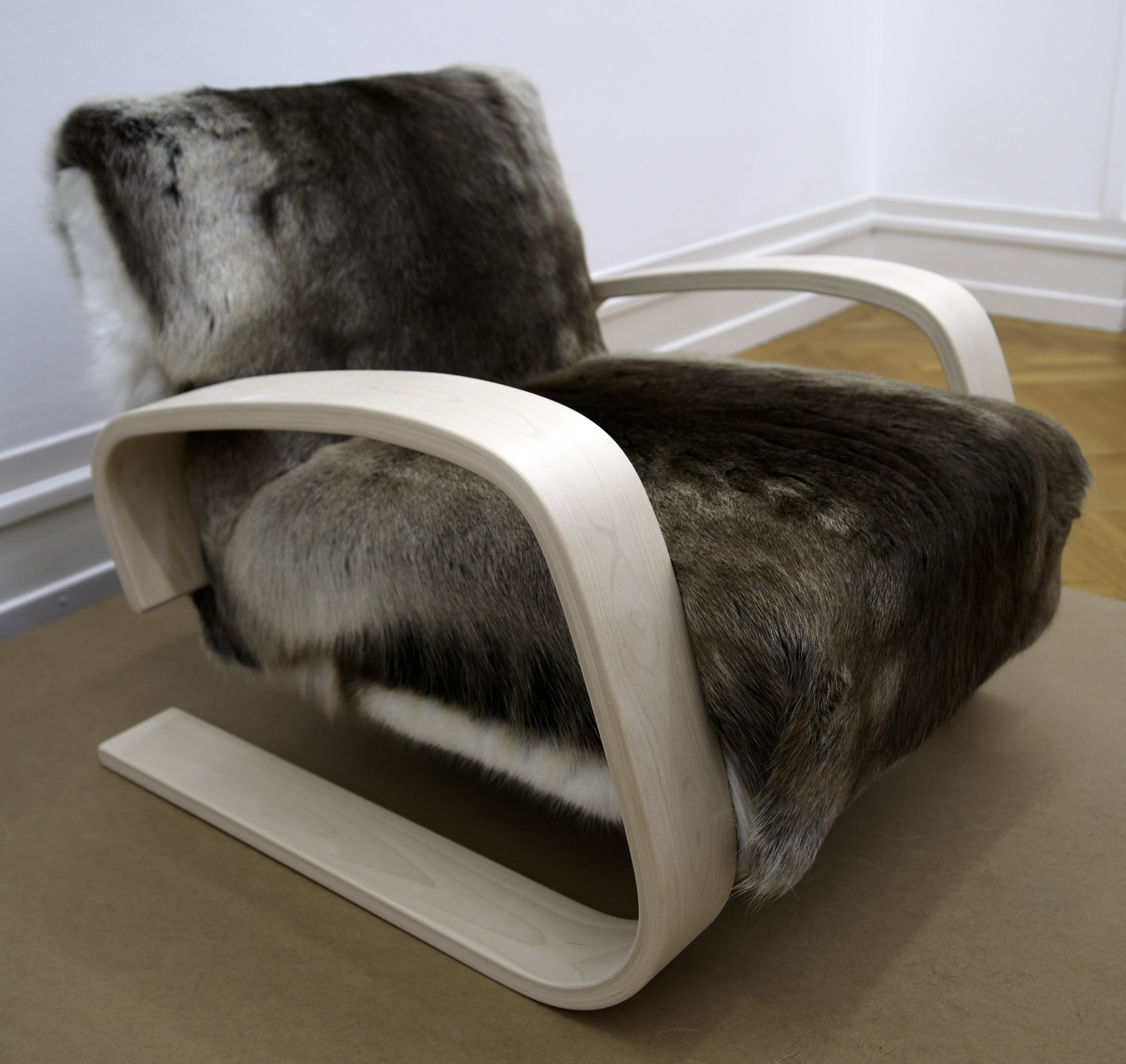
Armchair 400 with reindeer fur

- 1921–1923: Bell tower of Kauhajärvi Church, Lapua, Finland
- 1924–1926: Seinäjoki Civil Guard House, Seinäjoki, Finland
- 1924–1928: Municipal hospital, Alajärvi, Finland
- 1926–1929: Defence Corps Building, Jyväskylä, Finland
- 1927–1928: South-West Finland Agricultural Cooperative building, Turku, Finland
- 1927–1935: Municipal library, Viipuri, Finland (now Vyborg, Russia)
- 1928–1929, 1930: Turun Sanomat newspaper offices, Turku, Finland
- 1928–1933: Paimio Sanatorium, Tuberculosis sanatorium and staff housing, Paimio, Finland
- 1929–1931: Toppila cellulose factory (now remaining cultural venue Aalto Siilo) in Oulu, Finland
- 1931: Central University Hospital, Zagreb, Croatia (former Yugoslavia)
- 1932: Villa Tammekann, Tartu, Estonia
- 1934: Corso theatre, restaurant interior, Zürich, Switzerland
- 1936–1939: Ahlstrom Sunila Pulp Mill, Housing, and Town Plan, Kotka, Finland
- 1937–1939: Villa Mairea, Noormarkku, Finland
- 1939: Finnish Pavilion, at the 1939 New York World's Fair
- 1945: Sawmill at Varkaus, Finland
- 1947–1948: Baker House, Massachusetts Institute of Technology, Cambridge, Massachusetts, U.S.
- 1949–1966: Helsinki University of Technology, Espoo, Finland
- 1949–1952: Säynätsalo Town Hall, Säynätsalo (now part of Jyväskylä), Finland; 1949 competition, built 1952
- 1950–1957: National Pension Institution office building, Helsinki, Finland
- 1951–1971: University of Jyväskylä various buildings and facilities on the university campus, Jyväskylä, Finland
- 1952–1958: House of Culture, Helsinki, Finland
- 1953: The Experimental House, Muuratsalo, Finland
- 1953–1955: Rautatalo office building, Helsinki, Finland
- 1956–1958: Home for Louis Carré, Bazoches, France
- 1956–1958: Church of the Three Crosses, Vuoksenniska, Imatra, Finland
- 1957–1967: city center (library, theatre, City Hall, Lakeuden Risti Church and central administrative buildings), Seinäjoki, Finland
- 1958: Post and telegraph office, Baghdad, Iraq
- 1958–1972: KUNSTEN Museum of Modern Art Aalborg, Aalborg, Denmark
- 1959–1962: Community Centre, Wolfsburg, Germany
- 1959–1962: Church of the Holy Ghost (Heilig-Geist-Gemeindezentrum), Wolfsburg, Germany
- 1959–1962: Enso-Gutzeit headquarters, Helsinki, Finland
- 1961–1975: Lappia Hall performing arts and conference venue, Rovaniemi, Finland; part of the city's 'Aalto Centre'
- 1962: Aalto-Hochhaus, Bremen, Germany
- 1964–1965: Kaufmann Conference Center at the Institute of International Education, New York City, U.S.
- 1965: Rovaniemi library, Rovaniemi, Finland
- 1962–1971: Finlandia Hall, Helsinki, Finland
- 1963–1968: Church of St Stephen (Stephanus Kirche), Detmerode, Wolfsburg, Germany
- 1963–1965: Building for Västmanland-Dala nation, Uppsala, Sweden
- 1967–1970: Library at the Mount Angel Abbey, St. Benedict, Salem, Oregon, U.S.
- 1965–1968: Nordic House, Reykjavík, Iceland
- 1966: Church of the Assumption of Mary, Riola di Vergato, Italy (built 1975–1978)
- 1973: Alvar Aalto Museum, a.k.a. Taidemuseo, Jyväskylä, Finland
- 1970–1973: Sähkötalo, Helsinki, Finland
- 1978 (completed): Ristinkirkko, Lahti, Finland
- 1959–1988: Essen opera house, Essen, Germany
- 1986: Rovaniemi city hall, Rovaniemi, Finland

=== Furniture and glassware ===
Chairs

- 1932: Paimio Chair
- 1933: Model 60 stacking stool
- 1933: Four-legged Stool E60
- 1935–36: Armchair 404 (a/k/a/ Zebra Tank Chair)
- 1939: Armchair 406

Lamps

- 1954: Floor lamp A805
- 1959: Floor lamp A810

Vases

- 1936: Aalto Vase

== Critique of Aalto's architecture ==
As mentioned above, Aalto's international reputation was sealed with his inclusion in the second edition of Sigfried Giedion's influential book on Modernist architecture, Space, Time and Architecture: The growth of a new tradition (1949), in which Aalto received more attention than any other Modernist architect, including Le Corbusier. In his analysis of Aalto, Giedion gave primacy to qualities that depart from direct functionality, such as mood, atmosphere, intensity of life and even national characteristics, declaring that "Finland is with Aalto wherever he goes."

More recently, however, some architecture critics and historians have questioned Aalto's influence on the historical canon. The Italian Marxist architecture historians Manfredo Tafuri and Francesco Dal Co contend that Aalto's "historical significance has perhaps been rather exaggerated; with Aalto we are outside of the great themes that have made the course of contemporary architecture so dramatic. The qualities of his works have a meaning only as masterful distractions, not subject to reproduction outside the remote reality [sic] in which they have their roots." At the heart of their critique was the perception of Aalto's work as unsuited to the urban context: "Essentially, his architecture is not appropriate to urban typologies."

At the other end of the political spectrum (though similarly concerned with the appropriateness of Aalto's formal language), the American cultural theorist and architectural historian Charles Jencks singled out his Pensions Institute as an example of what he termed the architect's "soft paternalism": "Conceived as a fragmented mass to break up the feeling of bureaucracy, it succeeds all too well in being humane and killing the pensioner with kindness. The forms are familiar – red brick and ribbon-strip windows broken by copper and bronze elements – all carried through with a literal-mindedness that borders on the soporific."

During his lifetime, Aalto faced criticisms from his fellow architects in Finland, most notably Kirmo Mikkola and Juhani Pallasmaa. By the last decade of Aalto's life, his work was seen as unfashionably individualistic at a time when the opposing tendencies of rationalism and constructivism – often championed under left-wing politics – argued for anonymous, aggressively non-aesthetic architecture. Of Aalto's late works, Mikkola wrote, "Aalto has moved to [a] baroque line..."

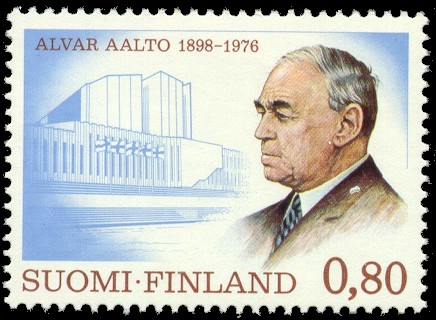
Alvar Aalto portrayed on a stamp published in 1976

== Memorials ==
Aalto has been commemorated in a number of ways:

- Alvar Aalto is the eponym of the Alvar Aalto Medal, an international architecture award.
- Aalto was featured in the 50 mk note in the last series of the Finnish markka (before its replacement by the Euro in 2002).
- The centenary of Aalto's birth in 1998 was marked in Finland not only by several books and exhibitions, but also by the promotion of specially bottled red and white Aalto Wine and a specially designed cupcake.
- In 1976, the year of his death, Aalto was commemorated on a Finnish postage stamp.
- Piazza Alvar Aalto, a square named after Aalto, can be found in the Porta Nuova business district of Milan, Italy.
- Aalto University, a Finnish university formed by merging Helsinki University of Technology, Helsinki School of Economics and TaiK in 2010, is named after Alvar Aalto.
- An Alvar Aallon katu (Alvar Aalto Street) can be found in five different Finnish cities: Helsinki, Jyväskylä, Oulu, Kotka and Seinäjoki.
- In 2017, the Alvar Aalto Museum launched Alvar Aalto Cities, that is, a network of cities containing buildings by Alvar Aalto. The objective of the network is to increase awareness of Aalto's work both in Finland and abroad. It is hoped that by combining forces on communications and marketing, the visibility and accessibility of exhibitions, tourist attractions and events will be improved. To date, the network city members are: Aalborg, Alajärvi, Espoo, Eura, Hamina, Helsinki, Imatra, Jyväskylä, Järvenpää, Kotka, Kouvola, Lahti, Oulu, Paimio, Pori, Raseborg, Rovaniemi, Seinäjoki, Turku, Vantaa and Varkaus. It is estimated that in total there would be 40 cities worldwide that would qualify as an Alvar Aalto City.
- From 22 April– 2 October 2016, the Bard Graduate Center exhibited Artek and the Aaltos: Creating a Modern World. The exhibit “was the first exhibition in the United States to examine Artek, a pioneering Finnish design company founded in 1935, and the first to have a specific focus on the two architect co-founders, Alvar Aalto (1898–1976) and Aino Marsio-Aalto (1894–1949).”
- On 26th July 2026, Aalto's work was inscribed on the UNESCO World Heritage List. The series, named Aalto Works, consists of 13 architecturally significant sites designed by Aalto and his partners, Aino and Elissa.

== See also ==
- Architecture of Finland
- Aino Aalto
- Elissa Aalto
