= Vyborg Library =

Library in Vyborg, Russia

Central City Alvar Aalto Library
- Viipurin kaupunginkirjasto
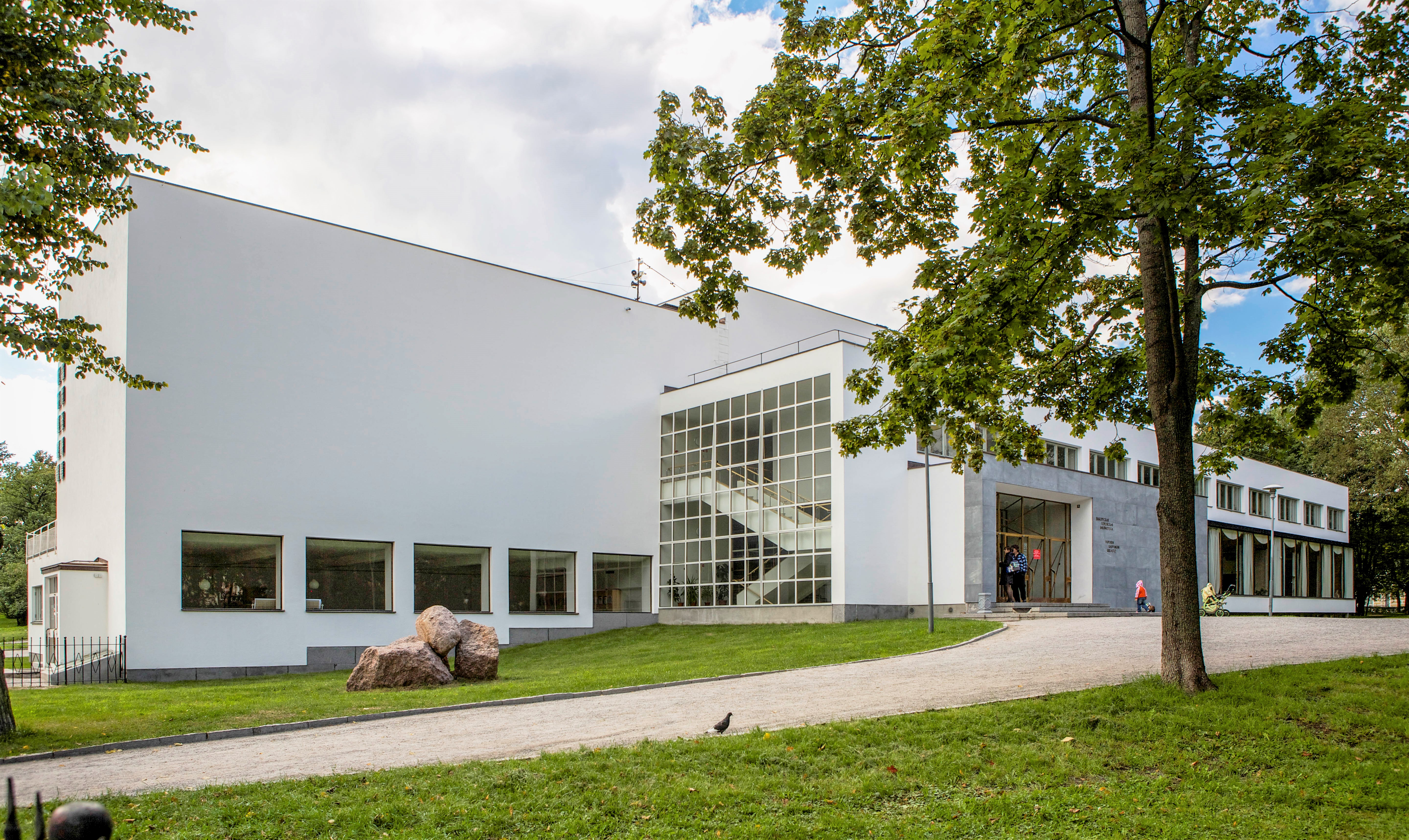
- Exterior view of Vyborg Library following restoration in 2014
- 60.709049°N 28.747047°E
- Location: Vyborg, Leningrad Oblast, Russia
- Type: Public library
- Established: 1935
- Architects: Aino and Alvar Aalto

Other information
- Website: Official website

Vyborg Library (Finnish: Viipurin kaupunginkirjasto) is a public library in Vyborg, Russia, designed by Finnish architects Aino Aalto and Alvar Aalto, built between 1927 and 1935 when the city (then named Viipuri) was part of Finland.

It is widely recognised as a pioneering masterpiece of 20th-century functionalist architecture and an early landmark of regional modernism. The building became internationally acclaimed for its innovative natural lighting systems, an undulating timber auditorium ceiling engineered for acoustic precision, and its custom child-scaled interior design.

The library was originally named Viipuri City Library. Following the Second World War, when Finland handed the territory over to the Soviet Union, it was renamed the Nadezhda Krupskaya Municipal Library. Located in modern-day Russia, it is officially named the Central City Alvar Aalto Library. Following decades of post-war neglect, an extensive two-decade international restoration project was completed in 2013, returning the building and its original interior details to active public use.

== History and design ==
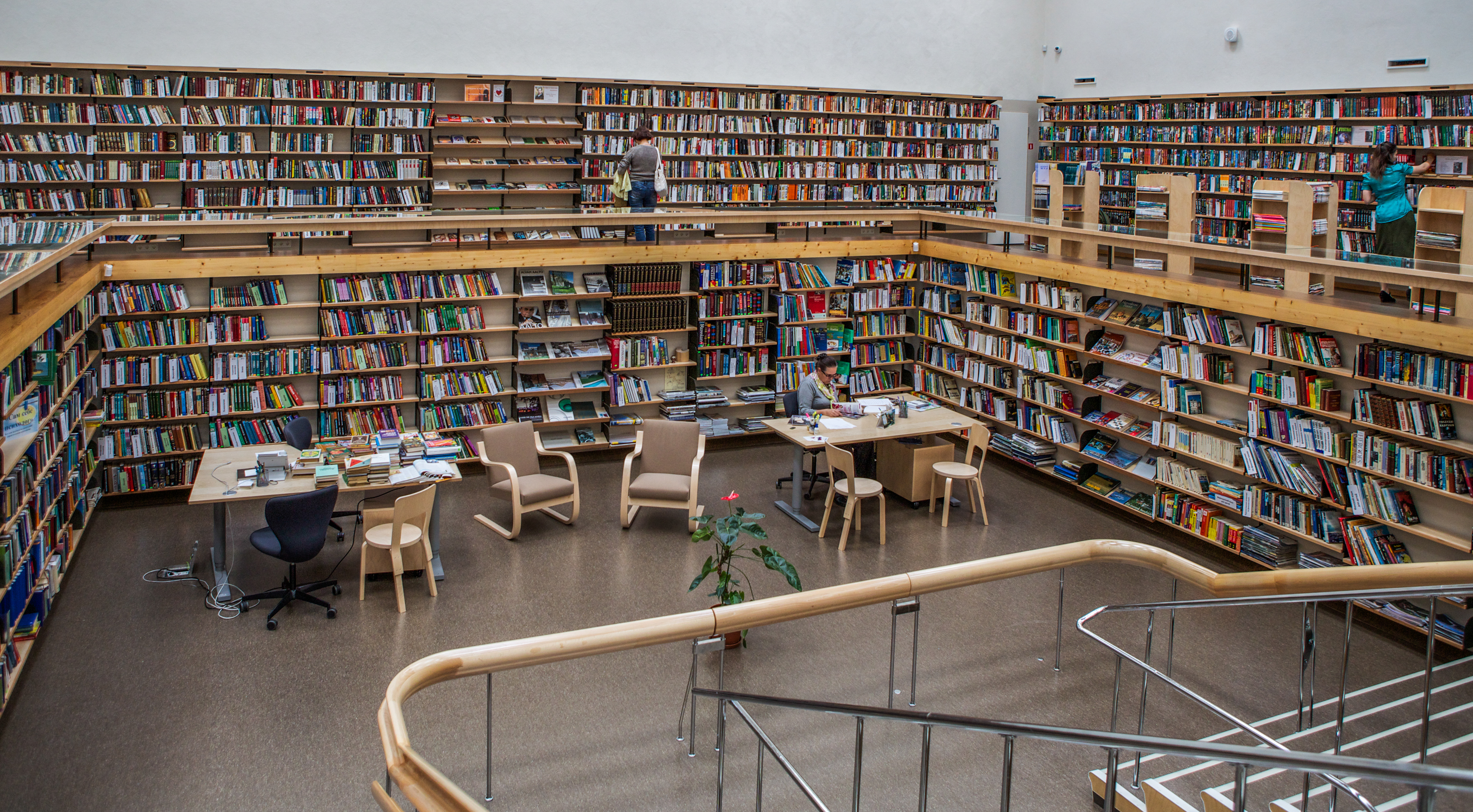
Interior reading room in 2014

In 1927, Aino Aalto and Alvar Aalto won first prize in an architectural competition for the new library with their entry titled 'W.W.W.'. Their original proposal reflected Nordic Classicism (influenced by Gunnar Asplund's Stockholm City Library), but over an extended five-year development phase from 1928 to 1933, the design shifted completely into a purist modernist style.

The finished library introduced several spatial innovations that became signature features of the Aalto office's work:

- Sunken reading well: A stepped central reading and lending hall that created an open, multi-level space.
- Diffuse natural lighting: Deep cylindrical skylights designed to spread daylight evenly across reading desks without harsh glare.
- Acoustic wave ceiling: An undulating wooden ceiling in the auditorium engineered to reflect sound throughout the room.
- Natural materials: Concrete, white plaster, glass, and steel were balanced with timber fittings, leather, and woven fabrics.

=== Children's wing and interior design ===
The library was the first public library in Finland to feature a dedicated children's wing and an open-shelf lending system. Aino Aalto led the child-scaled interior architecture and furniture design for this section. Drawing on discussions with her sister—a trained nursery school teacher—and research into Montessori education, Aino designed custom low-level furniture, handrails, door handles, and shelving that allowed children to interact independently with the space.

=== Wartime damage and Soviet era ===
During the Second World War, the territory was ceded to the Soviet Union. The building suffered military damage and sat abandoned for a decade, leading to severe decay, including the total destruction of the auditorium's wave ceiling. In the 1950s, Soviet architect Aleksandr Shver drew up plans to restore the building in a Stalinist classical style, though these were never fully carried out. Before the late 1980s, restricted access to Vyborg led to widespread misinformation in Western architectural literature, including incorrect claims that the building had been completely destroyed.

== Restoration ==
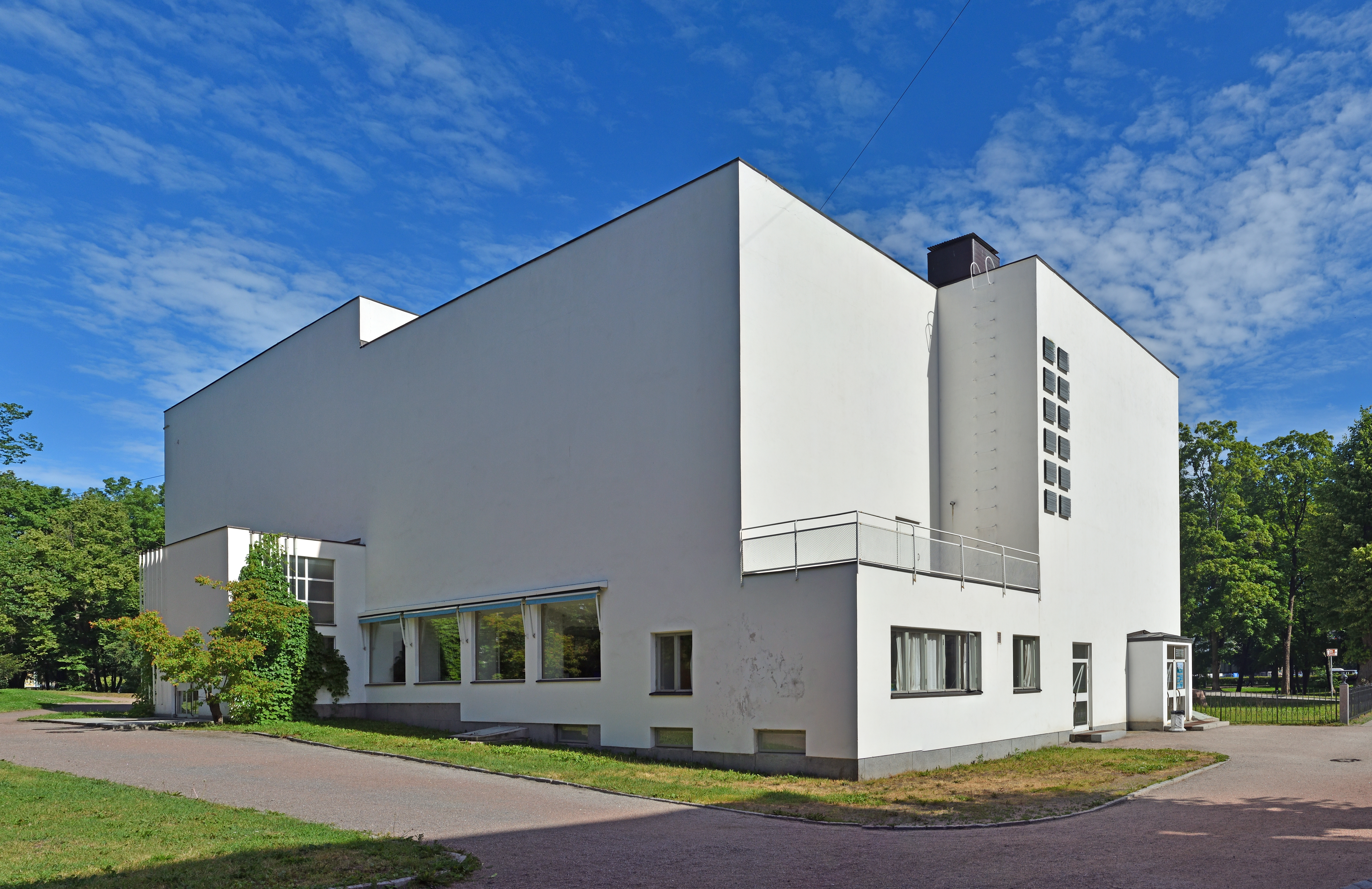
Restored exterior facade in 2019

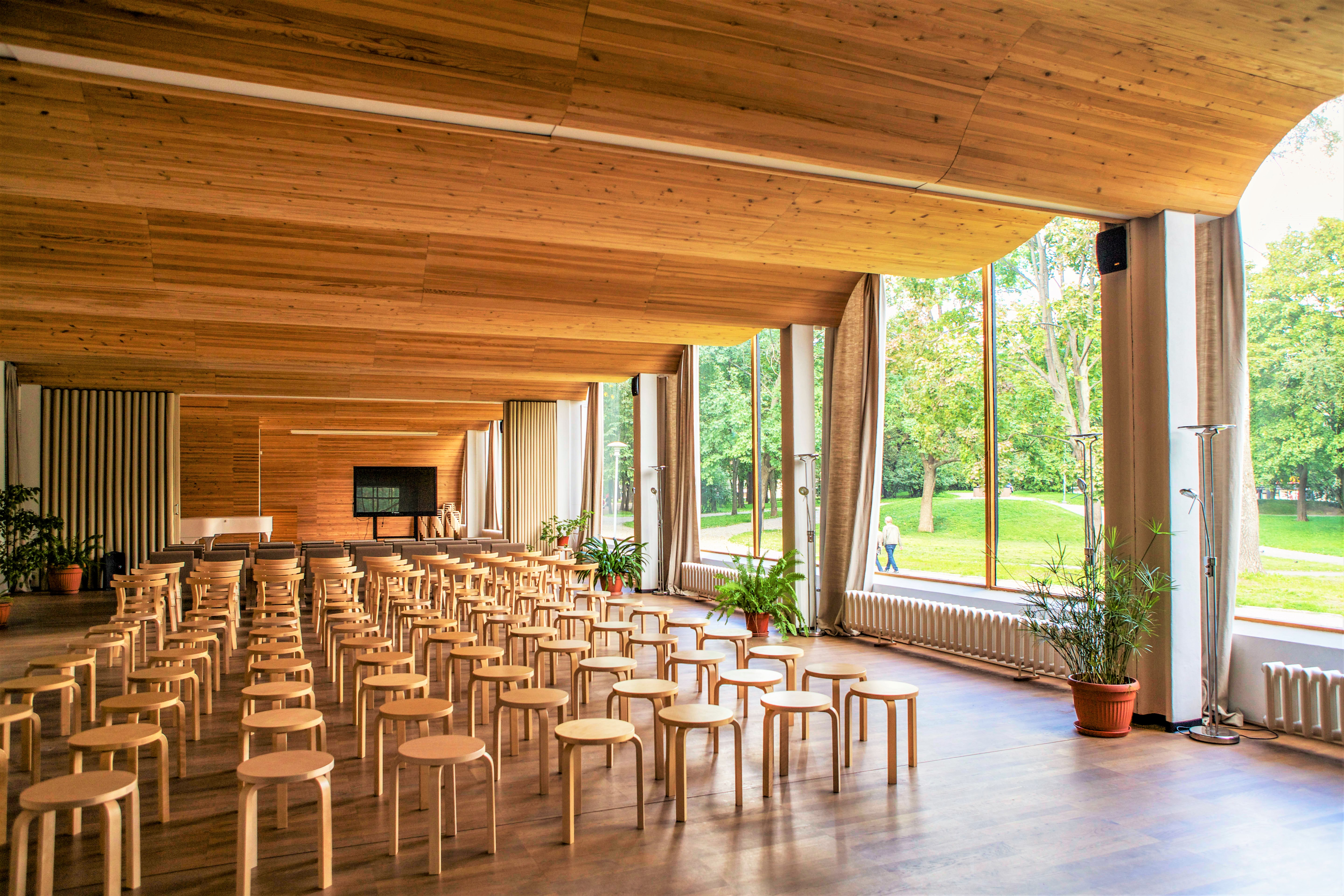
Restored auditorium and acoustic ceiling in 2014

In 1994, joint Finnish and Russian restoration committees were established to restore the building. Overseen by the Alvar Aalto Academy and led by Finnish architect Tapani Mustonen alongside Maija Kairamo and former office staff, the project initially relied on international donations.

Early work focused on critical structural repairs, including rebuilding the roof-lights, restoring exterior steel window frames, and reconstructing a section of the auditorium ceiling. The restoration gained momentum in 2010 following discussions between Finnish President Tarja Halonen and Russian Prime Minister Vladimir Putin, which secured 6.5 million euros in direct funding from the Russian central government.

The total restoration cost nearly 9 million euros and was completed in late 2013. The restoration team referred to original office drawings to recreate destroyed features—including the undulating wood ceiling and custom furniture—while preserving select mid-century structural modifications.

=== Recognition ===
- 2014: World Monuments Fund / Knoll Modernism Prize
- 2015: Europa Nostra Award / European Union Prize for Cultural Heritage

== In art ==
The library served as the location for the 2002 art and documentary project What's the time in Vyborg? by

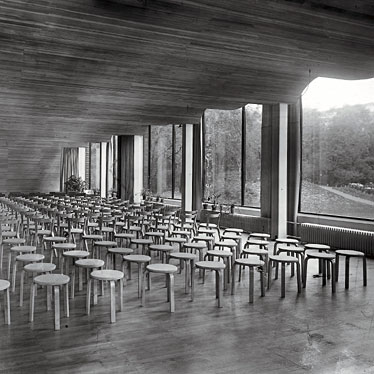
Auditorium ceiling prior to lamp installation

Finnish-American artist Liisa Roberts, which ran creative writing workshops for local youths inside the building to explore the shared cultural history of the area.

== Quotes ==
When I designed the Viipuri City Library (and I had plenty of time, a whole five years), I spent long periods getting my range, as it were, with naive drawings. I drew all kinds of fantastic mountain landscapes, with slopes lit by many suns in different positions, which gradually gave rise to the main idea of the building. The architectural framework of the library comprises several reading and lending areas stepped at different levels, with the administrative and supervisory centre at the peak... (Alvar Aalto, "The Trout and the Stream", 1947)

== See also ==
- Architecture of Finland
- Aino Aalto
- List of libraries in Russia
