= Lordi discography =

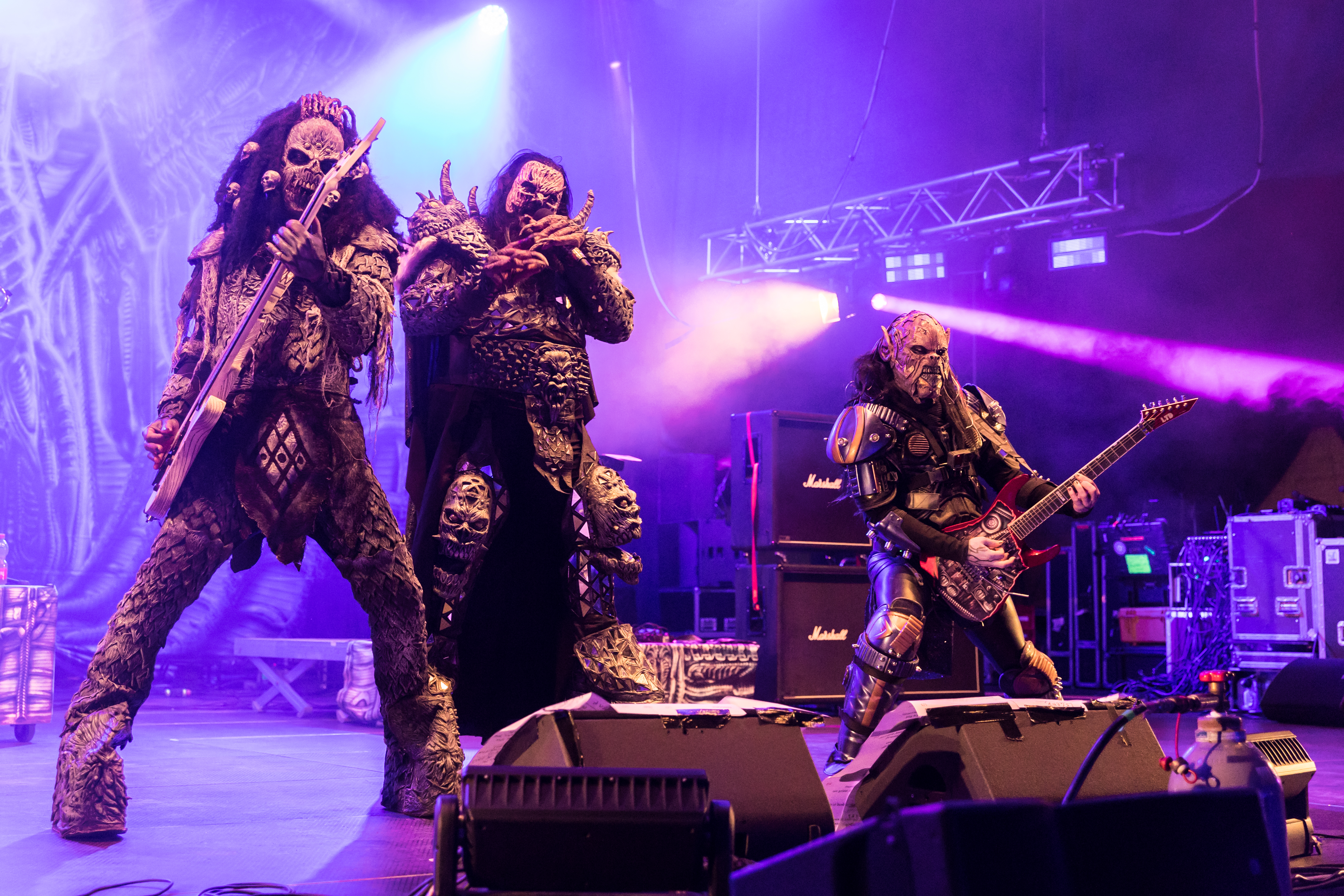
- Studio albums: 19
- Compilation albums: 3
- Singles: 36
- Video albums: 3
- Music videos: 23
- Lyric videos: 11

Lordi is a Finnish rock band formed in 1992 by the band's lead singer, songwriter and costume-designer, Mr Lordi. The band is known for wearing monster masks and using pyrotechnics during concerts. They rose to domestic success in 2002 with their first single, "Would You Love a Monsterman?". The band's eleventh through their seventeenth studio albums were released as part of the box set Lordiversity.

== Albums ==
=== Studio albums ===
List of studio albums, with selected chart positions, sales figures and certifications
Title	Album details	Peak chart positions										Certifications
Title	Album details	FIN	AUT	BEL (FL)	FRA	GER	NOR	SWE	SWI	UK	US Heat.	Certifications
Get Heavy	Released: 1 November 2002; Label: BMG Finland, Drakkar; Formats: CD, LP, digital download	3	—	—	—	70	—	—	—	—	—	IFPI FIN: 2× Platinum
The Monsterican Dream	Released: 14 April 2004; Label: BMG Finland, Drakkar; Formats: CD, digital download	4	—	—	—	—	—	—	—	—	—	IFPI FIN: Platinum
The Arockalypse	Released: 10 March 2006; Label: Sony BMG, Drakkar, The End; Formats: CD, LP, digital download	1	11	13	98	7	21	1	8	100	17	IFPI FIN: 3× Platinum; GLF: Gold
Deadache	Released: 23 October 2008; Label: Sony Music; Formats: CD, LP, digital download	5	51	—	168	33	—	42	73	—	13	
Babez for Breakfast	Released: 10 September 2010; Label: Sony Music; Formats: CD, LP, digital download	9	71	—	113	66	—	—	—	—	43	
To Beast or Not to Beast	Released: 1 March 2013; Label: Sony Music; Formats: CD, LP, digital download	8	67	—	—	56	—	—	95	—	—	
Scare Force One	Released: 31 October 2014; Label: AFM; Formats: CD, LP, digital download	13	—	—	—	62	—	—	—	—	—	
Monstereophonic (Theaterror vs. Demonarchy)	Released: 16 September 2016; Label: AFM; Formats: CD, LP, digital download	10	—	—	—	52	—	—	83	—	—	
Sexorcism	Released: 25 May 2018; Label: AFM; Formats: CD, LP, digital download	19	74	—	—	20	—	—	64	—	—	
Killection	Released: 31 January 2020; Label: AFM; Formats: CD, LP, digital download	8	—	—	—	13	—	—	24	—	—	
Lordiversity	Released: 26 November 2021; Label: AFM; Formats: CD, LP, digital download	15	—	—	—	48	—	—	—	—	—	
Screem Writers Guild	Released: 31 March 2023; Label: Atomic Fire; Formats: CD, LP, digital download	7	—	—	—	28	—	—	86	—	—	
Limited Deadition	Released: 21 March 2025; Label: Reigning Phoenix Music; Formats: CD, LP, digital download	28	64	—	—	55	—	—	47	—	—	
"—" denotes a recording that did not chart or was not released in that territory.

=== Compilations ===
Name	Release date
The Monster Show	February 17, 2005
Zombilation – The Greatest Cuts	February 20, 2009
Scarchives Vol. 1	September 3, 2012

=== Video albums ===
- Market Square Massacre (2006)
- Bringing Back the Balls to Stockholm (2007)
- Recordead Live – Sextourcism in Z7 (2019)

== Singles ==
- "Would You Love a Monsterman?" (2002)
- "Devil Is a Loser" (2003)
- "My Heaven Is Your Hell" (2004)
- "Blood Red Sandman" (2004)
- "Hard Rock Hallelujah" (2006)
- "Who's Your Daddy?" (2006)
- "It Snows in Hell" (2006)
- "They Only Come Out at Night" (2007)
- "Beast Loose in Paradise" (2008)
- "Bite It Like a Bulldog" (2008)
- "Deadache" (2008)
- "This Is Heavy Metal" (2010)
- "The Riff" (2013)
- "Nailed by the Hammer of Frankenstein" (2014)
- "Hug You Hardcore" (2016)
- "Your Tongue's Got the Cat" (2018)
- "Naked in My Cellar" (2018)
- "Shake the Baby Silent" (2019)
- "I Dug a Hole in the Yard for You" (2019)
- "Like a Bee to the Honey" (2020)
- "Believe Me" (2021)
- "Abracadaver" (2021)
- "Borderline" (2021)
- "Merry Blah Blah Blah" (2021)
- "Demon Supreme" (2021)
- "Day Off of the Devil" (2022)
- "Spear of the Romans" (2022)
- "Reel Monsters" (2022)
- "Lucyfer Prime Evil" (2023)
- "Thing in the Cage" (2023)
- "Dead Again Jayne" (2023)
- "Made of Metal" (2024)
- "Syntax Terror" (2024)
- "Retropolis" (2025)
- "Hellizabeth" (2025)
- "Pantamera (Pan-Tah-Meh-Rah!)" (2026)
- "Hold Me Now" (2026)

== Videos ==
=== Music videos ===
- "Would You Love a Monsterman?" (2002)
- "Devil Is a Loser" (2003)
- "Blood Red Sandman" (2004)
- "Hard Rock Hallelujah" (2006)
- "Who's Your Daddy?" (2006)
- "Would You Love a Monsterman 2006" (2006)
- "It Snows in Hell" (2006)
- "Hard Rock Hallelujah" (Eurovision Song Contest, 2007)
- "Bite It Like a Bulldog" (2008)
- "This Is Heavy Metal" (2010)
- "The Riff" (2013)
- "Scare Force One" (2014)
- "Hug You Hardcore" (2016)
- "Naked in My Cellar" (2018)
- "I Dug a Hole in the Yard for You" (2019)
- "Believe Me" (2021)
- "Abracadaver" (2021)
- "Borderline" (2021)
- "Merry Blah Blah Blah" (2021)
- "Reel Monsters" (2022)
- "Dead Again Jayne" (2023)
- "Hellizabeth" (2025)
- "Pantamera (Pan-Tah-Meh-Rah!)" (2026)

=== Lyric videos ===
- "The Riff" (2013)
- "Nailed by the Hammer of Frankenstein" (2014)
- "Your Tongue’s Got the Cat" (2018)
- "Shake the Baby Silent" (2019)
- "Like a Bee to the Honey" (2020)
- "Demon Supreme" (2022)
- "Better Hate Than Never" (2022)
- "Lucyfer Prime Evil" (2023)
- "Thing in the Cage" (2023)
- "Syntax Terror" (2024)
- "Retropolis" (2025)
