= Joseph Terwilliger =

American geneticist

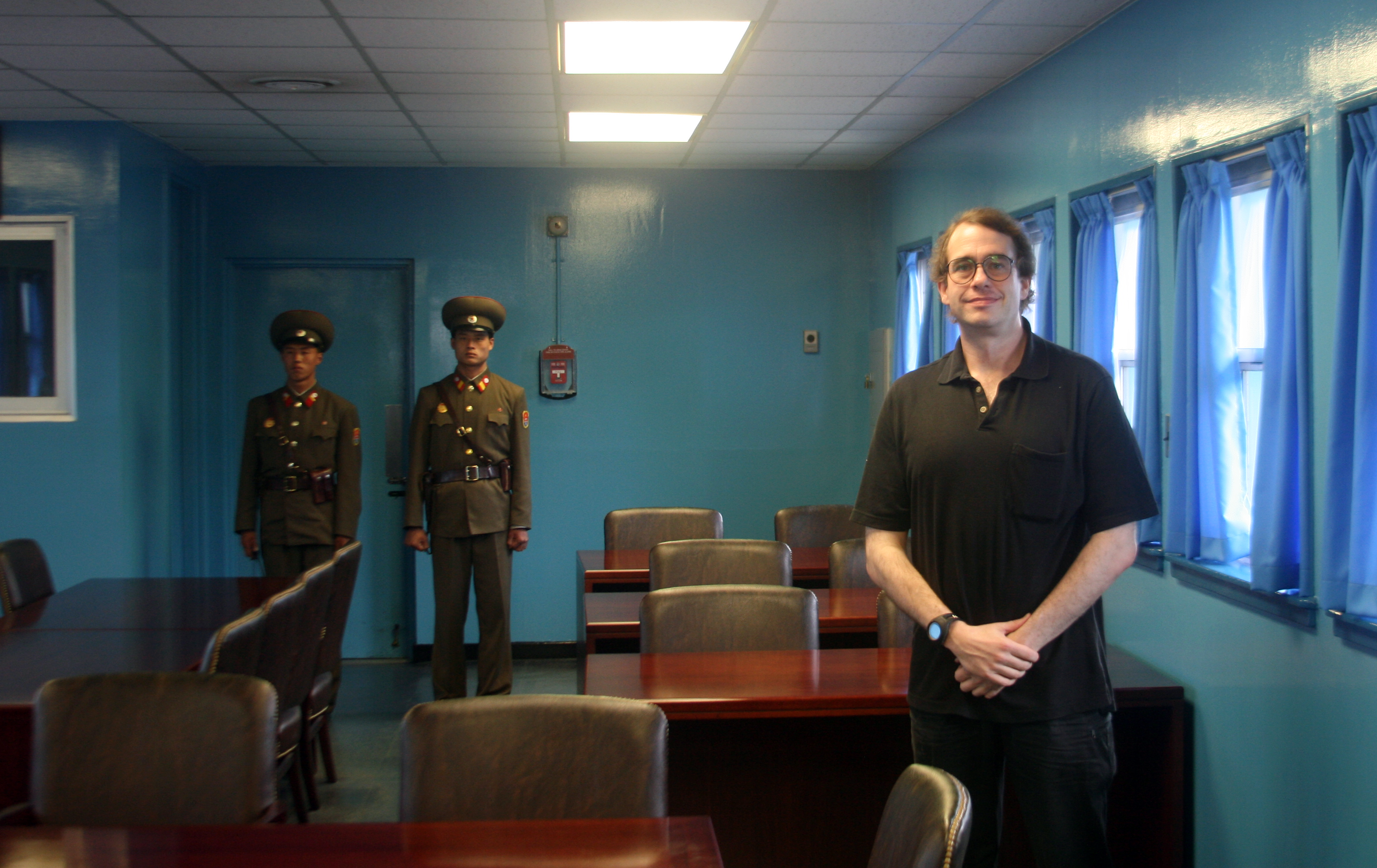
- Terwilliger at the Korean Demilitarized Zone, 2009
- Born: Joseph Douglas Terwilliger; New York, New York
- Education: Peabody Conservatory of Music, Columbia University Graduate School of Arts and Sciences, University of Oxford
- Known for: Statistical genetics
- Awards: Hitchings-Elion Fellowship from the Burroughs Wellcome Fund
- Scientific career
- Fields: Genetics
- Institutions: Columbia University; New York State Psychiatric Institute
- Thesis: New mathematical methods in human gene mapping (1993)
- Doctoral advisor: Jurg Ott

Joseph Douglas Terwilliger is an American geneticist and professor of neurobiology at the Columbia University Medical Center and the New York State Psychiatric Institute. In addition to his scientific research, he is known for accompanying retired basketball player Dennis Rodman on his visits to North Korea, where he has said that he serves as Rodman's translator. He began his involvement in Rodman's trips to the country after winning a basketball game with him at an auction.

== Education and career ==
A tuba player, Terwilliger received his bachelor's degree from the Peabody Conservatory of Music. After receiving his bachelor's, Terwilliger moved to New York City to look for a job in music, but later found himself drawn to a graduate school program in genetics and development at Columbia University Medical Center. He later recalled, "I could not believe they were actually going to pay me to go to grad school. In music you have to teach classes just to pay your tuition, and then you have to get a job to pay the rent. While in science they actually were going to pay me, which seemed like an unbelievable scam at the time." He decided to enroll in a graduate program at Columbia in genetics because he felt that, since he had been a music major, the alternative would probably be working at McDonald's; he later discovered he had a natural interest in statistical genetics. He went on to receive his Ph.D. from the Columbia University Graduate School of Arts and Sciences in 1993. He then received a Hitchings-Elion Fellowship from the Burroughs Wellcome Fund, which he spent working with Mark Lathrop at the Wellcome Centre for Human Genetics at the University of Oxford. In July 2013, he began teaching a human evolutionary genetics class at Pyongyang University of Science and Technology (PUST) in North Korea. He still teaches at PUST as of October 2017. He has an Erdős–Bacon number of 6, having appeared in Dennis Rodman's Big Bang in Pyongyang. He also sang additional vocals on the 2020 album Killection by Finnish heavy metal band Lordi.
