= Recordead Live – Sextourcism in Z7 =

Video by Lordi
- Released: 26 July 2019
- Recorded: 23 November 2018
- Genre: Heavy metal

Lordi chronology
Bringing Back the Balls to Stockholm (2007)	Recordead Live – Sextourcism in Z7 (2019)

Recordead Live – Sextourcism in Z7 is the third DVD by the Finnish rock band Lordi. The show was recorded on 23 November 2018 at Z7 Konzertfabrik in Pratteln, Switzerland, during the band's tour in support of their ninth studio album, Sexorcism. It was released on 26 July 2019. The set also included a two disc live album CD version of the concert.

== Track listing ==
1. Sexorcism
2. Would You Love a Monsterman?
3. Missing Miss Charlene/House of Ghosts
4. Your Tongue's Got the Cat
5. Heaven Sent Hell on Earth
6. Mr. Killjoy
7. Mana Solo
8. Rock the Hell Outta You
9. Blood Red Sandman
10. It Snows in Hell
11. Hella Solo
12. She's a Demon
13. Slashion Model Girls
14. Naked in My Cellar
15. Rock Police
16. Ox Solo
17. Hug You Hardcore
18. SCG9: The Documented Phenomenon
19. Evilyn
20. The Riff
21. Amen Solo
22. Nailed by the Hammer of Frankenstein
23. Who's Your Daddy
24. Devil Is a Loser
25. Hard Rock Hallelujah

Bonus content

1. "A Day in the Life on Sextourcism"

Music Videos:

1. Inferno (previously unreleased)
2. Would You Love a Monsterman? (2002 version)
3. Devil Is a Loser
4. Blood Red Sandman
5. Hard Rock Hallelujah
6. It Snows in Hell
7. Who's Your Daddy?
8. Would You Love a Monsterman? (2006 version)
9. Bite It Like a Bulldog
10. This Is Heavy Metal
11. The Riff
12. Scare Force One
13. Hug You Hardcore
14. Naked in My Cellar

CD 1

1. Sexorcism
2. Would You Love a Monsterman?
3. Missing Miss Charlene/House of Ghosts
4. Your Tongue's Got the Cat
5. Heaven Sent Hell on Earth
6. Mr. Killjoy
7. Rock the Hell Outta You
8. Blood Red Sandman
9. It Snows in Hell
10. She's a Demon

CD 2

1. Slashion Model Girls
2. Naked in My Cellar
3. Rock Police
4. Hug You Hardcore
5. Evilyn
6. The Riff
7. Nailed by the Hammer of Frankenstein
8. Who's Your Daddy
9. Devil is a Loser
10. Hard Rock Hallelujah

== Personnel ==
- Mr Lordi – vocals
- Amen – guitars
- OX – bass
- Mana – drums, backing vocals
- Hella – keyboards
