= Tonmi Lillman =

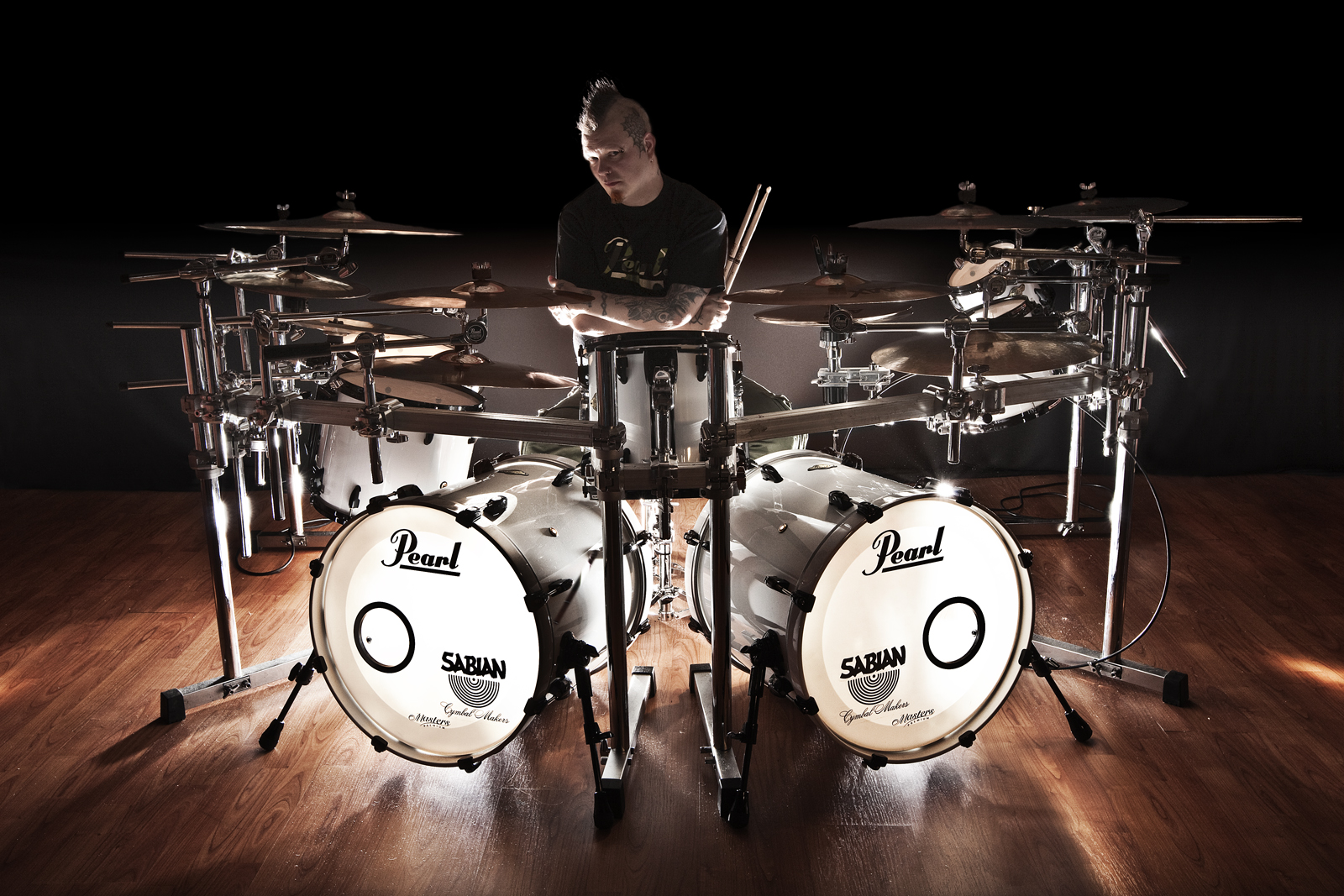
- Tonmi Lillman promo picture

Background information
- Also known as: Otus
- Born: 3 June 1973
- Origin: Helsinki, Finland
- Died: 14 February 2012 (aged 38)
- Occupations: Musician, producer, graphic designer

Tonmi Lillman (born Tommi Kristian Tapola, 3 June 1973 – 14 February 2012) was a Finnish musician, best known as Otus, the former drummer of the Finnish rock band Lordi.

Lillman died on 14 February 2012 after an illness.

== Career ==
Lillman's father was a musician, and as a result he grew up surrounded by a large assortment of instruments. Tonmi received his first drum kit at age 9 and started performing live at age 14. Apart from drums and bass guitar, his primary instruments, Tonmi also played the keyboards and guitar. Prior to his death, he was involved in the bands Ajattara, Kylähullut, Vanguard and 3rror. From his previous bands, he became best known as the drummer of Sinergy, To/Die/For and Lordi.

In his professional career Lillman also taught digital recording and drums at Kouvola Musiikkiopisto (Kouvola Conservatoire). He played in numerous folk, dance and pop orchestras, as well as handling the drums on the "Dimebag Beyond Forever 2009" tour alongside Rainer "Raikku" Tuomikanto.

=== Lordi ===
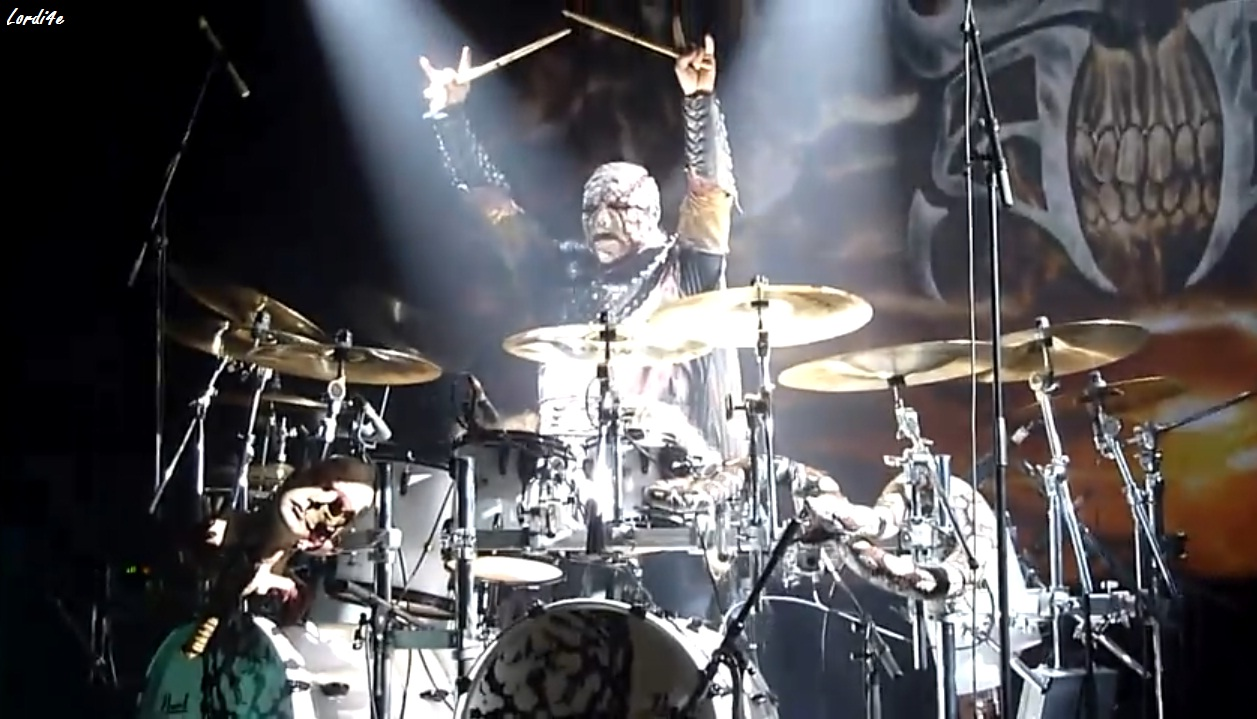
Otus on stage in 2010.

After Kita, the drummer of Lordi had decided to pursue a solo career, Tonmi sent a text message to Mr. Lordi saying that he had heard they needed a drummer. He had already worked with Mr Lordi when he helped him with Lordi's stage props. Mr Lordi accepted the offer and Tonmi became their second drummer with his new stage name "Otus" which is Finnish for "creature" or "thing". His first gig with the band took place during the "Europe For Breakfast Tour" on 5 November 2010 at Zal Ozhidania, St. Petersburg (Russia).

His character was described as a combination between a butcher, an executioner, an alien, a lizard, and a zombie. According to Lordi he was a "tough dude. And definitely one of the ugliest members in our family …"

Otus edited the DVD of the compilation album Scarchives Vol. 1 and can be heard on the documentary track. He didn't record any studio album with Lordi before his death, but the outro track of To Beast or Not to Beast is a live-record of Otus' drum solo.

After his death, Lordi Fan Nation, the fan magazine about the band, did a special edition in tribute to Otus.

== Studio work ==
Lillman had appeared on several albums, acting as a studio musician for bands such as Reflexion, Twilight Ophera, and for instance providing the drum work for the Guitar Heroes -album. Recently Tonmi has distinguished himself as a studio engineer, mixing and recording such bands as Beherit, Bloodride, Chainhill, D-Creation, Exsecratus, Fierce, Fear of Domination, Heorot, In Silentio Noctis, Laava, Lie in Ruins, MyGRAIN, Rage My Bitch, Raivopäät, Roo, Rujo, Rytmihäiriö, Saattue, Serene Decay, Trauma, Vapaat Kädet and V For Violence.

== Equipment ==
Tonmi Lillman used Pearl drums, Sabian cymbals and Pro-Mark drum sticks, and has signed an endorsement contract with the aforementioned labels. Lillman was known for his characteristic style of drum placement and was a devout user of double kick drums. His style of drumming was rooted in rock, so he valued good groove and a strong rhythmic backbone, combined with innovative fills, over high speeds and blast beats. Tonmi mentioned as his main influences the drummers Teijo "Twist Twist" Erkinharju, Mikkey Dee, Deen Castronovo, and his greatest influence as Dave Weckl.

== Graphics and music videos ==
Besides music, Tonmi worked as a graphic designer specializing in 3D-graphics. He has also worked as an editor on music videos, such as on Ajattara's "...Putoan" and "Ikuisen Aamun Sara", "Marks on My Face" by Mind of Doll, the Kylähullut video "Kieli hanurissa" and on "Whisper" by Vanguard. He has designed the cover art for bands like To/Die/For, Sinergy, Kylähullut, HateFrame, D-Creation and Dance Nation, among several others. In addition, he has edited video presentations, commercials and product labels for different companies as well as providing video production and post production to, for instance, the Crumbland promo DVD. Tonmi also designed and produced the background animations for Lordi's European tour. Other graphical works include web designing, site production and providing banners and animation for various on-line gaming sites.
