= Scare Force One =

Studio album by Lordi
- Released: 31 October 2014
- Genre: Hard rock; heavy metal; shock rock
- Length: 48:08
- Label: AFM Records
- Producer: Mikko Karmila

Lordi chronology
To Beast or Not to Beast (2013)	Scare Force One (2014)	Monstereophonic (Theaterror vs. Demonarchy) (2016)

Singles from Scare Force One
- 1. "Nailed by the Hammer of Frankenstein" Released: 19 September 2014

Scare Force One is the seventh studio album by the Finnish rock band Lordi. It was released on 31 October 2014 via AFM Records.

The album's name and cover artwork is a pun on Air Force One.

== Track list ==
No.	Title	Lyrics	Music	Length
1.	"SCG7: Arm Your Doors and Cross Check"		Mr Lordi	1:35
2.	"Scare Force One"	Mr Lordi, Tracy Lipp	Mr Lordi	4:58
3.	"How to Slice a Whore"	Mr Lordi, Tracy Lipp	Mr Lordi, OX	2:47
4.	"Hell Sent In the Clowns"	Mr Lordi, Tracy Lipp	Mr Lordi, Mana	4:20
5.	"House of Ghosts"	Mr Lordi, Tracy Lipp	Mr Lordi, Mana	4:12
6.	"Monster Is My Name"	Mr Lordi, Tracy Lipp	Mr Lordi	3:34
7.	"Cadaver Lover"	Mr Lordi, Tracy Lipp	Mr Lordi	3:51
8.	"Amen's Lament to Ra II"		Amen	1:10
9.	"Nailed by the Hammer of Frankenstein"	Mr Lordi, Tracy Lipp	Mr Lordi, P.K. Hell	3:20
10.	"The United Rocking Dead"	Mr Lordi, Tracy Lipp	Mr Lordi, Amen	5:46
11.	"She's a Demon"	Mr Lordi, Tracy Lipp	Mr Lordi	5:37
12.	"Hella's Kitchen"		Hella	1:10
13.	"Sir, Mr. Presideath, Sir! (+ETA)"	Mr Lordi, Tracy Lipp	Mr Lordi, Amen	5:44

Japanese bonus track
No.	Title	Writer(s)	Length
14.	"I'm So Excited" (The Pointer Sisters cover)	Anita Pointer, June Pointer, Ruth Pointer, Trevor Lawrence	4:20

== Personnel ==
Credits for Scare Force One adapted from liner notes.

Lordi

- Mr Lordi – vocals, artwork
- Amen – guitars
- OX – bass
- Mana – drums, backing vocals, recording
- Hella – keyboards, vocals

Backing vocals

- Tracy Lipp
- Katja Auvinen
- Riita Hyyppä
- Laura Ruohomäki
- Ralph Ruiz
- Pete Kangas
- Marko Ruohomäki

Production

- Mikko Karmila – production, engineering, mixing
- Mika Jussila – mastering
- Petri Haggrén – photography

== Charts ==
Chart (2014)	Peak position
Finland	13
Germany	62
