= Monstereophonic (Theaterror vs. Demonarchy) =

Studio album by Lordi
- Released: 16 September 2016
- Recorded: 2016
- Studios: Sonic Pump Studios, Finnvox
- Genres: Hard rock; heavy metal; shock rock; progressive metal
- Length: 64:19
- Label: AFM Records
- Producer: Nino Laurenne

Lordi chronology
Scare Force One (2014)	Monstereophonic (Theaterror vs. Demonarchy) (2016)	Sexorcism (2018)

Singles from Monstereophonic (Theaterror vs. Demonarchy)
- 1. "Hug You Hardcore" Released: 26 August 2016

Monstereophonic (Theaterror vs. Demonarchy) is the eighth studio album by the Finnish rock band Lordi, released on 16 September 2016. While Theaterror, the first half of the album, includes songs in the style that the band is generally known for, the second half of the album, Demonarchy, is conceptual and has lengthier songs. The band announced that the members' new costumes will be split in half, representing two sides of the album.

== Track listing ==
No.	Title	Lyrics	Music	Length
1.	"SCG8: One Message Waiting"	Mr. Lordi, Ralph Ruiz, Nino Laurenne	Mr. Lordi, Ruiz, Laurenne	1:10
2.	"Let’s Go Slaughter He-Man (I Wanna Be the Beast-Man in the Masters of the Universe)"	Mr Lordi, Tracy Lipp	Mr Lordi, Hella	4:30
3.	"Hug You Hardcore"	Mr Lordi, Lipp	Mr Lordi	3:40
4.	"Down with the Devil"	Mr Lordi, Lipp	Mr Lordi	4:29
5.	"Mary Is Dead"	Mr Lordi, Lipp	Mr. Lordi, Mana, Amen	4:37
6.	"Sick Flick"	Mr Lordi, Lipp	Mr Lordi	4:00
7.	"None for One"	Mr Lordi, Lipp	Mr Lordi, Mana, Amen	4:15
8.	"SCG VIII: Opening Scene"		Mr Lordi	1:22
9.	"Demonarchy"	Mr Lordi, Lipp	Mr Lordi	6:01
10.	"The Unholy Gathering"	Mr Lordi, Lipp	Mr Lordi	5:09
11.	"Heaven Sent Hell on Earth"	Mr Lordi, Lipp	Mr Lordi, OX	5:43
12.	"And the Zombie Says"	Mr Lordi, Lipp	Mr Lordi	6:23
13.	"Break of Dawn"	Mr Lordi, Lipp	Mr Lordi	5:47
14.	"The Night the Monsters Died"	Mr Lordi, Lipp	Mr Lordi	7:13
Total length:				64:19

== Personnel ==
Lordi

- Mr Lordi – vocals, artwork, layout, guitars (tracks 9–14)
- Amen – guitars (tracks 2–7)
- OX – bass
- Mana – drums, backing vocals, engineering
- Hella – keyboards

Additional musicians

- Nalle – keyboards (additional)
- Ralph Ruiz – narration (track 1)
- Peter Lerche – lead guitars (track 14)
- Jonas Olsson – stomp march (track 3)
- Tuomo Saikkonen – vocals (track 6)

Backing vocals

- Netta Dahlberg
- Katri Metso
- Tracy Lipp
- Jarkko Ahola
- Jessica Love
- Dylan Broda

Production

- Nino Laurenne – production, engineering, mixing
- Svante Forsbäck – mastering
- Mikko Röhman – engineering
- Miiro Varjus – engineering
- Eero Kokko – photography

== Charts ==
Chart (2016)	Peak position
Finnish Albums (Suomen virallinen lista)	10
German Albums (Offizielle Top 100)	52
Swiss Albums (Schweizer Hitparade)	83
