= Limited Deadition =

2025 studio album by Lordi

Studio album by Lordi
- Released: 21 March 2025
- Studio: IluSound (Helsinki); Finnvox (Helsinki)
- Genre: Hard rock
- Length: 44:47
- Label: RPM
- Producer: Mr Lordi

Lordi chronology
Screem Writers Guild (2023)	Limited Deadition (2025)

Singles from Limited Deadition
- 1. "Syntax Terror" Released: 12 December 2024; 2. "Retropolis" Released: 17 January 2025; 3. "Hellizabeth" Released: 13 February 2025

Professional ratings
Review scores
Source	Rating
Blabbermouth	7/10

Limited Deadition is the nineteenth studio album by the Finnish rock band Lordi. It was released on 21 March 2025 via Reigning Phoenix Music.

== Track listing ==
Limited Deadition track listing
No.	Title	Lyrics	Music	Length
1.	"SCG XIX: The Hexecutioners"	Mr Lordi; Ralph Ruiz	Mr Lordi	0:54
2.	"Legends Are Made of Clichés"	Mr Lordi; Tracy Lipp	Mr Lordi	3:59
3.	"Syntax Terror"	Mr Lordi; Tracy Lipp	Mr Lordi	4:25
4.	"Skelephant in the Room"	Mr Lordi; Tracy Lipp	Mr Lordi; Hiisi	3:44
5.	"SCGTV Saturday Night Main Event"	Mr Lordi; Ralph Ruiz	Mr Lordi	0:20
6.	"Killharmonic Orchestra"	Mr Lordi; Tracy Lipp	Mr Lordi; Kone	3:40
7.	"Collectable"	Mr Lordi; Tracy Lipp	Mr Lordi; Kone	4:20
8.	"SCGTV Monstersquad Action Figures"	Mr Lordi; Ralph Ruiz	Mr Lordi	0:54
9.	"Fangoria"	Mr Lordi; Tracy Lipp	Mr Lordi	3:41
10.	"Hellizabeth"	Mr Lordi; Tracy Lipp	Mr Lordi	3:41
11.	"SCGTV The Hexecutioners Season Finale"	Mr Lordi; Ralph Ruiz	Mr Lordi	0:30
12.	"Retropolis"	Mr Lordi; Tracy Lipp	Mr Lordi; Kone	3:29
13.	"Frighteousness"	Mr Lordi; Tracy Lipp	Mr Lordi	3:08
14.	"SCGTV Crazeee Ralph Promo"	Mr Lordi; Ralph Ruiz	Mr Lordi	0:42
15.	"Limited Deadition"	Mr Lordi; Tracy Lipp	Mr Lordi	4:05
16.	"You Might Be Deceased"	Mr Lordi; Tracy Lipp	Mr Lordi; Kone; Hiisi	3:31
Total length:				44:47

== Personnel ==
Credits for Limited Deadition adapted from liner notes.

Lordi

- Mr Lordi – lead and backing vocals, programming, production, artwork, design, layout
- Hella – keyboards, backing vocals
- Mana – drums, backing vocals, engineering
- Hiisi – bass, backing vocals
- Kone – guitars, backing vocals, engineering

Additional personnel

- Ralph Ruiz – vocals (tracks 1, 5, 8, 11, 14)
- Magnum – backing vocals
- Isabella Larsson – backing vocals
- Tracy Lipp – backing vocals, production, engineering
- Niki Westerback – backing vocals
- Marek Sabogal – photography
- Pauli Saastamoinen – mastering
- Ilkka Herkman – mixing, engineering
- Nalle – engineering
- Toivo Hellberg – choir vocals, engineering
- Janne Halmkrona – executive producer
- Madu Vatanen – engineering
- Marja Kortelainen, Joel Lindfors, Suvi Mikkonen, Niko Setälä, Sime Yliaska – choir

== Charts ==
Chart performance for Limited Deadition
Chart (2025)	Peak position
Austrian Albums (Ö3 Austria)	64
Finnish Albums (Suomen virallinen lista)	28
German Albums (Offizielle Top 100)	55
Swiss Albums (Schweizer Hitparade)	47
