= Killection =

2020 studio album by Lordi

Studio album by Lordi
- Released: 31 January 2020
- Recorded: 2019
- Studio: Finnvox Studios (Helsinki); Lappia Studios (Tornio); Studio JJ (Tampere); Here Studios (Helsinki); The Mökki (Rovaniemi); Birdrock Electric (Tampere)
- Length: 52:34; 56:05 (with bonus track)
- Label: AFM
- Producer: Mr Lordi

Lordi chronology
Sexorcism (2018)	Killection (2020)	Lordiversity (2021)

Singles from Killection
- 1. "Shake the Baby Silent" Released: 8 November 2019; 2. "I Dug a Hole in the Yard for You" Released: 29 November 2019; 3. "Like a Bee to the Honey" Released: 17 January 2020

Professional ratings
Review scores
Source	Rating
Blabbermouth.net	7.5/10

Killection is the tenth studio album by the Finnish rock band Lordi. It was released on 31 January 2020, via AFM Records. The band stated that the album is considered a 'fictional compilation' and would contain songs you would normally hear in the early 1970s to mid-1990s.

It is the first album to feature Hiisi on bass guitar, following the departure of longtime member OX.

== Track listing ==
No.	Title	Lyrics	Music	Length
1.	"Radio SCG 10"	Mr Lordi, Tracy Lipp	Mr Lordi	1:23
2.	"Horror for Hire"	Mr Lordi, Tracy Lipp	Mr Lordi	3:22
3.	"Shake the Baby Silent"	Mr Lordi, Tracy Lipp	Mr Lordi, Hella	3:36
4.	"Like a Bee to the Honey"	Paul Stanley, Jean Beauvoir	Paul Stanley, Jean Beauvoir	4:13
5.	"Apollyon"	Mr Lordi, Tracy Lipp	Mr Lordi	5:11
6.	"SCG10 The Last Hour"	Mr Lordi, Tracy Lipp	Mr Lordi	1:31
7.	"Blow My Fuse"	Mr Lordi, Tracy Lipp	Mr Lordi	3:31
8.	"I Dug a Hole in the Yard for You"	Mr Lordi, Tracy Lipp	Mr Lordi	4:11
9.	"Zombimbo"	Mr Lordi, Tracy Lipp	Mr Lordi	4:53
10.	"Up to No Good"	Mr Lordi, Tracy Lipp	Mr Lordi	3:58
11.	"SCG10 Demonic Semitones"	Mr Lordi, Tracy Lipp	Mr Lordi	1:20
12.	"Cutterfly"	Mr Lordi, Tracy Lipp	Mr Lordi	4:20
13.	"Evil"	Mr Lordi, Tracy Lipp	Mr Lordi	4:34
14.	"Scream Demon"	Mr Lordi, Tracy Lipp	Mr Lordi, Amen, Jean Beauvoir	4:38
15.	"SCG10 I Am Here"	Mr Lordi, Tracy Lipp	Mr Lordi	1:51

Vinyl bonus track
No.	Title	Lyrics	Music	Length
15.	"Carnivore"	Mr Lordi, Tracy Lipp	Mr Lordi	3:26

== Personnel ==
All information from the album booklet.

Lordi

- Mr Lordi – lead vocals, production, artwork, layout, all instruments (1, 6, 11, 15)
- Amen – guitars
- Mana – drums, backing vocals, executive producer, recording (additional vocals)
- Hella – keyboards, backing vocals
- Hiisi – bass guitar

Guest/session musicians

- Michael Monroe – saxophone on "Like a Bee to the Honey"
- Dylan Broda – vocals (1, 11)
- Joseph Terwilliger – additional vocals (1)
- Kari A. Kilgast – vocals, voice impersonations (1, 4)
- Ralph Ruiz – vocals (6, 11, 15)

Backing vocals

- Dylan Broda
- Tracy Lipp
- Isabella Larsson
- Toivo Hellberg
- Noora Kosmina
- Katja Auvinen
- Riitta Hyyppä
- Maria Jyrkäs
- Niki Westerback
- Netta Laurenne

Production

- Janne Halmkrona – executive producer
- Eero Kokko – photography
- Mikko Karmila – recording, mixing
- Janne Huotari – recording, mixing
- Rake Eskolin – mixing
- Juuso Nordlund – recording, mixing
- Toivo Hellberg – recording, mixing
- Mika Jussila – mastering
- Matti Vatanen – recording
- Nalle – recording
- Tracy Lipp – recording, mixing

== Charts ==
Sales chart performance for Killection
Chart (2020)	Peak position
Finnish Albums (Suomen virallinen lista)	8
German Albums (Offizielle Top 100)	13
Hungarian Albums (MAHASZ)	28
Swiss Albums (Schweizer Hitparade)	24
