= To Beast or Not to Beast =

Studio album by Lordi
- Released: 1 March 2013
- Genre: Hard rock; heavy metal; shock rock
- Length: 43:10
- Label: Sony Music (Finland); AFM Records (Europe); The End Records (United States, Canada)
- Producer: Michael Wagener

Lordi chronology
Babez for Breakfast (2010)	To Beast or Not to Beast (2013)	Scare Force One (2014)

Singles from To Beast or Not to Beast
- 1. "The Riff" Released: 8 February 2013

To Beast or Not to Beast is the sixth studio album by the Finnish rock band Lordi, released on 1 March 2013. As is traditional for the band, their costumes were renewed again for the release of this album. The album was produced and mixed by Michael Wagener and engineered by Shani Gandhi. It is the first album to feature members Mana and Hella. It also marks the first and only appearance of former drummer Otus, who died in 2012.

In Germany the album was released in digipak covers. The album has been released as LP version in EMP store.

== Track listing ==
No.	Title	Lyrics	Music	Length
1.	"We're Not Bad for the Kids (We're Worse)"	Mr Lordi, Tracy Lipp	Mr Lordi, Amen	3:23
2.	"I Luv Ugly"	Lordi, Lipp	Lordi	3:47
3.	"The Riff"	Lordi, Lipp	Lordi, Amen	3:44
4.	"Something Wicked This Way Comes"	Lordi, Lipp	Lordi, Amen	4:57
5.	"I'm the Best"	Lordi	Lordi, P.K. Hell	3:14
6.	"Horrifiction"	Lordi, Lipp	Lordi	3:28
7.	"Happy New Fear"	Lordi, Lipp	Lordi, OX, Hell, Amen	4:45
8.	"Schizo Doll"	Lordi, Lipp	Lordi	4:34
9.	"Candy for the Cannibal"	Lordi, Lipp	Lordi, Hell	4:42
10.	"Sincerely with Love"	Lordi, Lipp	Lordi	3:13
11.	"SCG6: Otus' Butcher Clinic"	Otus	Otus	3:23
Total length:				43:10

Japanese edition bonus track
No.	Title	Writer(s)	Length
12.	"Hulking Dynamo"	Mr Lordi	3:03
Total length:			46:13

== Trivia ==
- This album breaks from the Lordi tradition of having the first track being an SCG track; the SCG track on this album is instead the final track.
- It also breaks tradition with the album title. In all their previous albums, the album title is also the title of one of the songs (Bend Over and Pray the Lord, Get Heavy, Deadache, Babez for Breakfast) or the title is part of the lyrics in a song somewhere on the album (The Monsterican Dream are lyrics in "Blood Red Sandman" and The Arockalypse are lyrics in "Hard Rock Hallelujah"). This album, however, does not contain a song called To Beast or Not to Beast, nor is it anywhere in the lyrics for any of the songs.
- The album title was originally planned to be "Monsterial Phonica". But after Kiss released their album "Monster", Mr. Lordi thought that their album's name was too close to that so the band changed it to be "Upgradead". However, the band did not consider it an A-class name. Just few months before the release of the album, Amen came up with the final title, which the band felt suitable and perfect.

== Personnel ==
Credits for To Beast or Not to Beast adapted from liner notes.

Lordi

- Mr Lordi – vocals, artwork
- Amen – guitars, backing vocals
- OX – bass
- Mana – drums
- Hella – keyboards, backing vocals

Production

- Michael Wagener – production, mixing, mastering, backing vocals
- Shani Gandhi – engineering
- Petri Haggrén – photography

Additional musicians

- Otus – drums (11)
- Mark Slaughter – backing vocals
- Terry LeRoi – backing vocals
- Jeremy Asbrock – backing vocals
- Clay Vann – backing vocals
- Tracy Lipp – backing vocals
- Ralph Ruiz – backing vocals

== Charts ==
Chart (2013)	Peak position
Austria	67
Finland	8
Germany	56
Switzerland	95
