= Screem Writers Guild =

2023 studio album by Lordi

Studio album by Lordi
- Released: 31 March 2023
- Length: 55:06
- Label: Atomic Fire
- Producer: Mr Lordi, Mana, Janne Halmkrona

Lordi chronology
Lordiversity (2021)	Screem Writers Guild (2023)	Limited Deadition (2025)

Singles from Screem Writers Guild
- 1. "Lucyfer Prime Evil" Released: 27 January 2023; 2. "Thing in the Cage" Released: 3 March 2023; 3. "Dead Again Jayne" Released: 31 March 2023

Professional ratings
Review scores
Source	Rating
Blabbermouth	7.5/10

Screem Writers Guild is the eighteenth studio album by the Finnish rock band Lordi. It was released on 31 March 2023, and is their only album under the label Atomic Fire Records. The album has been described as not a concept album, but contains a "cinematic horror movie" theme throughout.

It is the first studio album to feature guitarist Kone, following the departure of the band's original guitarist Amen.

== Track listing ==
Screem Writers Guild track listing
No.	Title	Lyrics	Music	Length
1.	"Dead Again Jayne"	Mr Lordi, Tracy Lipp	Mr Lordi, Mana	4:33
2.	"SCG XVIII: Nosferuiz Horror Show"	Mr Lordi, Tracy Lipp, Ralph Ruiz	Mr Lordi	1:04
3.	"Unliving Picture Show"	Mr Lordi, Tracy Lipp	Mr Lordi	3:47
4.	"Inhumanoid"	Mr Lordi, Tracy Lipp	Mr Lordi, Kone	3:43
5.	"Thing in the Cage"	Mr Lordi, Tracy Lipp	Mr Lordi	5:13
6.	"Vampyro Fang Club"	Mr Lordi, Tracy Lipp	Mr Lordi	4:15
7.	"The Bride"	Mr Lordi, Tracy Lipp	Mr Lordi	4:08
8.	"Lucyfer Prime Evil"	Mr Lordi, Tracy Lipp	Mr Lordi, Kone	4:48
9.	"Scarecrow"	Mr Lordi, Tracy Lipp	Mr Lordi, Kone	3:57
10.	"Lycantropical Island"	Mr Lordi, Tracy Lipp	Mr Lordi	3:50
11.	"In the Castle of Dracoolove"	Mr Lordi, Tracy Lipp	Mr Lordi	4:40
12.	"The SCG Awards"	Mr Lordi, Tracy Lipp, Ralph Ruiz	Mr Lordi	1:40
13.	"Heavengeance"	Mr Lordi, Tracy Lipp	Mr Lordi	4:13
14.	"End Credits"	Mr Lordi, Tracy Lipp	Mr Lordi	5:15
Total length:				55:06

Bonus DVD

1. "Blood Red Sandman"
2. "Biomechanic Man"
3. "Devil is a Loser"
4. "Who's Your Daddy"
5. "Hard Rock Hallelujah"

== Personnel ==
Credits for Screem Writers Guild adapted from liner notes.

Lordi

- Mr Lordi – lead and backing vocals, programming, engineering, artwork
- Hella – keyboards, backing vocals
- Mana – drums, engineering, backing vocals
- Hiisi – bass, backing vocals
- Kone – guitar, engineering, backing vocals

Additional musicians

- Ralph Ruiz – vocals as "Nosferuiz"
- Magnum – backing vocals
- Josefin Silen – backing vocals
- Marja Kortelainen – backing vocals
- Antton Ruusunen – backing vocals
- Toivo Hellberg – backing vocals
- Leia Broda – additional vocals

Production

- Ilkka Herkman – mixing
- Pauli Saastamoinen – mastering
- Tracy Lipp – production, programming and backing vocals
- Janne Halmkrona – production, backing vocals
- Nalle – engineering
- Toivo Hellberg – engineering, backing vocals
- Antton Ruusunen – backing vocals
- Eero Kokko – photography

== Charts ==
Chart performance for Screem Writers Guild
Chart (2023)	Peak position
Finnish Albums (Suomen virallinen lista)	7
German Albums (Offizielle Top 100)	28
Swiss Albums (Schweizer Hitparade)	86
UK Rock & Metal Albums (OCC)	29
