= Lordiversity =

2021 box set by Lordi

Box set by Lordi
- Released: 26 November 2021
- Recorded: 2020–2021
- Studio: Studio JJ (Tampere); StudioPop Oy (Helsinki); The Varasto (Rovaniemi); Boulder Studios (Tampere); Kyllä Siittä Vain Tuntoo Studios (Tampere); Sonic Pump Studios (Helsinki); The Mökki (Rovaniemi); Lappia Studios (Tornio); Finnvox Studios (Helsinki); Here Studios (Helsinki)
- Genre: Hard rock; disco; progressive rock; heavy metal; AOR; thrash metal; industrial metal
- Length: 283:35
- Label: AFM
- Producer: Mr Lordi; Mana; Janne Halmkrona

Lordi chronology
Killection (2020)	Lordiversity (2021)	Screem Writers Guild (2023)

Singles from Lordiversity
- 1. "Believe Me" Released: 19 August 2021; 2. "Abracadaver" Released: 24 September 2021; 3. "Borderline" Released: 22 October 2021; 4. "Merry Blah Blah Blah" Released: 24 November 2021; 5. "Demon Supreme" Released: 17 December 2021; 6. "Day Off of the Devil" Released: 7 January 2022; 7. "Spear of the Romans" Released: 28 January 2022

Professional ratings
Review scores
Source	Rating
Blabbermouth.net	8/10

Lordiversity is a box set by the Finnish rock band Lordi that contains their eleventh to seventeenth studio albums: Skelectric Dinosaur, Superflytrap, The Masterbeast from the Moon, Abusement Park, Humanimals, Abracadaver and Spooky Sextravaganza Spectacular. It is a follow-up to the band's previous release Killection. It is the final release to feature founding member and guitarist Amen.

The box set was released on CD and vinyl formats on 26 November 2021 via AFM Records. The albums were published on digital platforms separately from November 2021 to February 2022.

== Production ==
After the COVID-19 pandemic had postponed their tour in support of Killection, the band decided to use the extra time to start working on more material to release a week after the postponement. Mr Lordi stated: "It was clear that it is the time to start planning the new album, even though Killection was released not even two months before. I was thinking that the most boring thing we could do after Killection, is to do another basic Lordi album. And I was very much enjoying the different styles of song writing, recording and production on Killection, but another boring idea would have been to do a part two."

On 6 April 2021, it was announced that Lordi would be releasing no less than seven studio albums in October 2021. In the statement regarding the albums, the band said: "The albums will sound all different from each other, they're all in different styles and fictional eras in the Killection timeline. Five of the seven albums are already done, by the way, and number six is well on the way." Mr Lordi originally wanted to do ten albums for the boxset, but the label told him that it was too much and that seven albums were fine.

On 19 August 2021, the band had released their single, "Believe Me", and had at the same time announced Lordiversity. The second single, "Abracadaver", was released on 24 September 2021. The third single "Borderline", was released on 22 October 2021, along with a music video. On 24 November 2021, the fourth single "Merry Blah Blah Blah" was released. On 17 December 2021, the fifth single "Demon Supreme" was released. On 7 January 2022, the sixth single "Day Off of the Devil" was released.

== Composition ==
=== Influences, style and themes ===
For Skelectric Dinosaur, the band used the influences of early Kiss and Alice Cooper. The cover design references the Hotter than Hell cover art. Superflytrap is inspired by the bands Earth, Wind & Fire, Boney M. and Bee Gees. On The Masterbeast from the Moon, the band was influenced by Rush and Pink Floyd. Set on a fictional timeline of 1983 and 1984, Abusement Park has a classic heavy metal sound influenced by W.A.S.P., Twisted Sister, Kiss, and Scorpions, and includes a Christmas-themed single, the aforementioned "Merry Blah Blah Blah". The AOR influenced sound in Humanimals is influenced by Bon Jovi, Desmond Child and Alice Cooper. Set on a fictional timeline for 1991, Abracadaver is inspired by Anthrax, Metallica, and Pantera. The last record from 1995, Spooky Sextravaganza Spectacular, is machine-made.

The fictional release years for the various albums are: 1975, 1979, 1981, 1984, 1989, 1991 and 1995.

== Track listing ==
=== Skelectric Dinosaur ===
No.	Title	Lyrics	Music	Length
1.	"SCG Minus 7: The Arrival"	Mr Lordi, Tracy Lipp	Mr Lordi, Hella	1:09
2.	"Day Off of the Devil"	Mr Lordi, Tracy Lipp	Mr Lordi	3:33
3.	"Starsign Spitfire"	Mr Lordi, Tracy Lipp	Mr Lordi	3:03
4.	"Maximum-O-Lovin'"	Mr Lordi, Tracy Lipp	Mr Lordi	2:23
5.	"The King on the Head Staker's Mountain"	Mr Lordi, Tracy Lipp	Mr Lordi	5:21
6.	"Carnivore"	Mr Lordi, Tracy Lipp	Mr Lordi	3:30
7.	"Phantom Lady"	Mr Lordi, Tracy Lipp	Mr Lordi	3:16
8.	"The Tragedy of Annie Mae"	Mr Lordi, Tracy Lipp	Mr Lordi	3:45
9.	"Blow My Fuse"	Mr Lordi, Tracy Lipp	Mr Lordi	3:35
10.	"...And Beyond the Isle was Mary"		Amen, Hella	2:15
Total length:				31:50

=== Superflytrap ===
No.	Title	Lyrics	Music	Length
1.	"SCG Minus 6: Delightful Pop-Ins"	Mr Lordi, Tracy Lipp	Mr Lordi	1:08
2.	"Macho Freak"	Mr Lordi, Tracy Lipp	Mr Lordi	3:42
3.	"Believe Me"	Mr Lordi, Tracy Lipp	Mr Lordi	4:27
4.	"Spooky Jive"	Mr Lordi, Tracy Lipp	Mr Lordi	3:55
5.	"City of the Broken Hearted"	Mr Lordi, Tracy Lipp	Mr Lordi	4:02
6.	"Bella from Hell"	Mr Lordi, Tracy Lipp	Mr Lordi	3:26
7.	"Cast Out from Heaven"	Mr Lordi, Tracy Lipp	Mr Lordi	3:51
8.	"Gonna Do It (or Do It and Cry)"	Mr Lordi, Tracy Lipp	Mr Lordi	2:51
9.	"Zombimbo"	Mr Lordi, Tracy Lipp	Mr Lordi	4:52
10.	"Cinder Ghost Choir"	Mr Lordi, Tracy Lipp	Mr Lordi	6:06
Total length:				38:20

=== The Masterbeast from the Moon ===
No.	Title	Lyrics	Music	Length
1.	"SCG Minus 5: Transmission Request"	Mr Lordi, Tracy Lipp, Ralph Ruiz	Mr Lordi	1:35
2.	"Moonbeast"	Mr Lordi, Tracy Lipp	Mr Lordi	6:29
3.	"Celestial Serpents"	Mr Lordi, Tracy Lipp	Mr Lordi	6:07
4.	"Hurricane of the Slain"	Mr Lordi, Tracy Lipp	Mr Lordi	3:00
5.	"Spear of the Romans"	Mr Lordi, Tracy Lipp	Mr Lordi	5:46
6.	"Bells of the Netherworld"	Mr Lordi, Tracy Lipp	Mr Lordi	3:01
7.	"Transmission Reply"	Mr Lordi, Tracy Lipp	Mr Lordi	0:20
8.	"Church of Succubus"	Mr Lordi, Tracy Lipp	Mr Lordi	11:58
9.	"Soliloquy"	Mr Lordi, Tracy Lipp	Mr Lordi	1:51
10.	"Robots Alive!"	Mr Lordi, Tracy Lipp	Mr Lordi	4:09
11.	"Yoh-Haee-Von"		Mr Lordi	1:17
12.	"Transmission on Repeat"	Mr Lordi, Tracy Lipp	Mr Lordi	1:04
Total length:				46:37

=== Abusement Park ===
No.	Title	Lyrics	Music	Length
1.	"SCG Minus 4: The Carnival Barker"	Mr Lordi, Tracy Lipp, Ralph Ruiz	Mr Lordi	0:54
2.	"Abusement Park"	Mr Lordi, Tracy Lipp	Mr Lordi	3:33
3.	"Grrr!"	Mr Lordi, Tracy Lipp	Mr Lordi	3:48
4.	"Ghost Train"	Mr Lordi, Tracy Lipp	Mr Lordi	3:18
5.	"Carousel"	Mr Lordi, Tracy Lipp	Mr Lordi, Mana	4:24
6.	"House of Mirrors"	Mr Lordi, Tracy Lipp	Mr Lordi	3:51
7.	"Pinball Machine"	Mr Lordi, Tracy Lipp	Mr Lordi	3:34
8.	"Nasty, Wild and Naughty"	Mr Lordi, Tracy Lipp	Mr Lordi	3:10
9.	"Rollercoaster"	Mr Lordi, Tracy Lipp	Mr Lordi, Amen	4:45
10.	"Up to No Good"	Mr Lordi, Tracy Lipp	Mr Lordi	4:02
11.	"Merry Blah Blah Blah"	Mr Lordi, Tracy Lipp	Mr Lordi	4:05
Total length:				39:24

=== Humanimals ===
No.	Title	Lyrics	Music	Length
1.	"SCG Minus 3: Scarctic Circle Telethon"	Mr Lordi, Tracy Lipp, Ralph Ruiz	Mr Lordi, Toivo Hellberg	1:20
2.	"Borderline"	Mr Lordi, Tracy Lipp	Mr Lordi	4:12
3.	"Victims of the Romance"	Mr Lordi, Tracy Lipp	Mr Lordi	3:47
4.	"Heart of a Lion"	Mr Lordi, Tracy Lipp	Mr Lordi	4:33
5.	"The Bullet Bites Back"	Mr Lordi, Tracy Lipp	Mr Lordi, Mana	4:07
6.	"Be My Maniac"	Mr Lordi, Tracy Lipp	Mr Lordi	3:40
7.	"Rucking Up the Party"	Mr Lordi, Tracy Lipp	Mr Lordi	4:07
8.	"Girl in a Suitcase"	Mr Lordi, Tracy Lipp	Mr Lordi	4:07
9.	"Supernatural"	Mr Lordi, Tracy Lipp	Mr Lordi, Mana	3:49
10.	"Like a Bee to the Honey"	Paul Stanley, Jean Beauvoir	Paul Stanley, Jean Beauvoir	4:15
11.	"Humanimal"	Mr Lordi, Tracy Lipp	Mr Lordi, Amen, Jean Beauvoir	3:53
Total length:				41:50

=== Abracadaver ===
No.	Title	Lyrics	Music	Length
1.	"SCG Minus 2: Horricone"		Mr Lordi	1:18
2.	"Devilium"	Mr Lordi, Tracy Lipp	Mr Lordi	3:46
3.	"Abracadaver"	Mr Lordi, Tracy Lipp	Mr Lordi, Mana	3:41
4.	"Rejected"	Mr Lordi, Tracy Lipp	Mr Lordi, Hiisi	3:44
5.	"Acid Bleeding Eyes"	Mr Lordi, Tracy Lipp	Mr Lordi, Amen	3:28
6.	"Raging at Tomorrow"	Mr Lordi, Tracy Lipp	Mr Lordi	5:01
7.	"Beast of Both Worlds"	Mr Lordi, Tracy Lipp	Mr Lordi	4:59
8.	"I'm Sorry I'm Not Sorry"	Mr Lordi, Tracy Lipp	Mr Lordi, Hiisi	3:34
9.	"Bent Outta Shape"	Mr Lordi, Tracy Lipp	Mr Lordi, Hella	5:05
10.	"Evil"	Mr Lordi, Tracy Lipp	Mr Lordi	4:35
11.	"Vulture of Fire"	Mr Lordi, Tracy Lipp	Mr Lordi	3:47
12.	"Beastwood"		Mr Lordi	0:56
Total length:				43:54

=== Spooky Sextravaganza Spectacular ===
No.	Title	Lyrics	Music	Length
1.	"SCG Minus 1: The Ruiz Ranch Massacre"	Mr Lordi, Tracy Lipp, Ralph Ruiz	Mr Lordi, Tracy Lipp	3:26
2.	"Demon Supreme"	Mr Lordi, Tracy Lipp	Mr Lordi	3:31
3.	"Re-Animate"	Mr Lordi, Tracy Lipp	Mr Lordi, Hiisi	4:13
4.	"Lizzard of Oz"	Mr Lordi, Tracy Lipp	Mr Lordi	4:08
5.	"Killusion"	Mr Lordi, Tracy Lipp	Mr Lordi	3:09
6.	"Skull and Bones (The Danger Zone)"	Mr Lordi, Tracy Lipp	Mr Lordi, Hiisi	3:16
7.	"Goliath"	Mr Lordi, Tracy Lipp	Mr Lordi, Amen	4:41
8.	"Drekavac"	Mr Lordi, Tracy Lipp	Mr Lordi, Hiisi	3:28
9.	"Terror Extra-Terrestrial"	Mr Lordi, Tracy Lipp	Mr Lordi	4:30
10.	"Shake the Baby Silent"	Mr Lordi, Tracy Lipp	Mr Lordi, Hella	3:36
11.	"If It Ain't Broken (Must Break It)"	Mr Lordi, Tracy Lipp	Mr Lordi, Hella	3:24
12.	"Anticlimax"	Mr Lordi, Tracy Lipp		0:18
Total length:				41:40

== Personnel ==
Credits for Lordiversity adapted from liner notes.

Lordi

- Mr Lordi – lead and backing vocals, guitars, programming, whistle, orchestration, engineering, mixing, production
- Amen – guitars
- Mana – drums, backing vocals, programming, engineering, mixing, co-production
- Hella – keyboards, backing vocals
- Hiisi – bass guitar

Additional personnel

- Ralph Ruiz – vocals
- Dylan Broda – vocals
- Tracy Lipp – vocals, backing vocals
- Michael Monroe – saxophone on "Like a Bee to the Honey"
- Annariina Rautanen – flute on "Moonbeast" and "Yoh-Haee-Von"
- Tony Kakko – backing vocals on "Rollercoaster"
- Joonas Suotamo – Chewbacca voice on "Grrr!"
- Kari A. Kilgast – vocals on "Like a Bee to the Honey"
- Hulk the Bulldog – voice on "Beastwood"
- Maki Kolehmainen – cowbell, backing vocals
- John Bartolome – vocals
- Lara Anastasia Mertanen – intro lead on "Drekavac"

Backing vocals

- Jessica Love, Maria Jyrkäs, Kaarle Westlie, Ville Virtanen, Olli Virtanen, Isabella Larsson, Noora Kosmina, Katja Auvinen, Riitta Hyyppä, Josefin Silén, Minna Virtanen, Antton Ruusunen, Niki Westerback, Marja Kortelainen, Tom Roine, Netta Laurenne

Children vocals

- Lumen Broda
- Leia Broda
- Lili Wasenius
- Aviana Westerback
- Roxana Westerback

Production

- Janne Halmkrona – co-production, backing vocals
- Visa Mertanen – orchestral production and instrumentation
- Tom Higgins – engineering, backing vocals
- Joe McGinness – engineering, backing vocals
- Matti Vatanen – engineering
- Nalle – engineering, additional keyboards, synth programming
- JC Halttunen – engineering
- M. Onster – engineering
- Madu Vatanen – engineering
- Mikko Karmila – engineering, mixing
- Juuso Nordlund – mixing
- Ilkka Herkman – mixing
- Rake Eskolin – mixing
- Janne Huotari – engineering, mixing
- Jussi Jaakonaho – mixing
- Ilkka Herkman – mixing
- Rake Eskolin – mixing
- Toivo Hellberg – engineering, mixing, vocals, backing vocals
- Jorma Hämäläinen – engineering, mixing, mastering
- Mika Jussila – mastering
- Jaakko Viitalähde – mastering
- Henkka Niemistö – mastering
- Eero Kokko – photography

== Charts ==
Chart performance for Lordiversity
Chart (2021)	Peak position
Finnish Albums (Suomen virallinen lista)	15
German Albums (Offizielle Top 100)	48
