= Lordi =

Finnish rock band

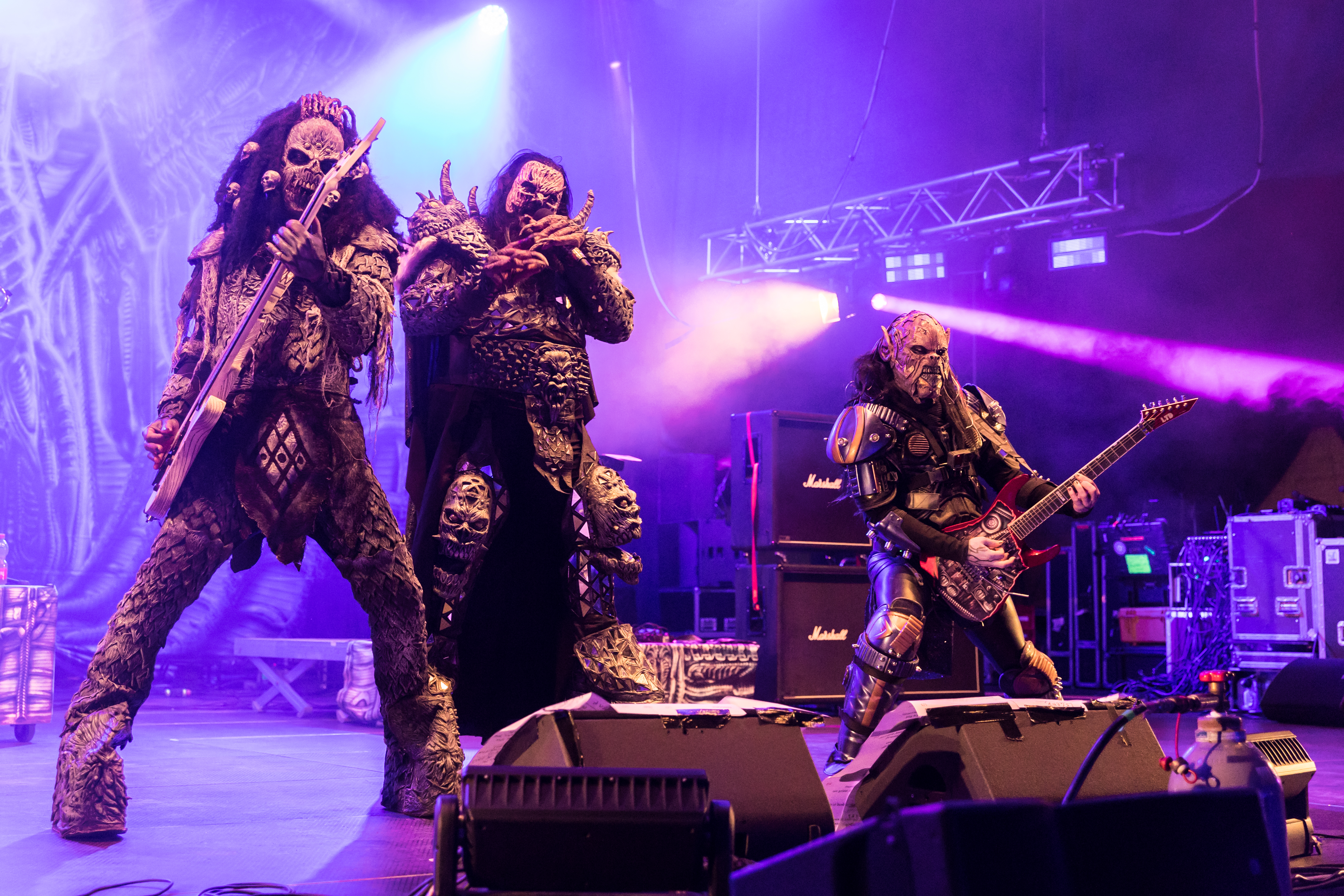
- Lordi performing in 2025 (L–R): Hiisi, Mr Lordi, Kone

Background information
- Origin: Rovaniemi, Finland
- Genres: Hard rock; heavy metal; shock rock
- Works: Discography
- Years active: 1992–present
- Labels: RPM; Atomic Fire; AFM; Sony; GUN; The End; BMG; Drakkar
- Members: Mr Lordi; Hella; Mana; Hiisi; Kone
- Past members: See former members
- Website: lordi.fi

Lordi (Finnish pronunciation: [ˈloːrdi]) is a Finnish rock band from Rovaniemi. The band was formed in 1992 by the band's lead singer, songwriter and costume maker Mr Lordi (Tomi Petteri Putaansuu), and are known for wearing monster masks and using horror elements with pyrotechnics during concerts and music videos. The band rose to fame in 2002 with their hit single "Would You Love a Monsterman?", and won the Eurovision Song Contest 2006 with their song "Hard Rock Hallelujah".

Lordi has toured and recorded actively since 2002, and Mr Lordi upgrades the band's costumes and masks for each album. The band has gone through several line-up changes with Mr Lordi being the only consistent member of the band since their foundation. Members of Lordi have stated their desire for their unmasked faces to remain private.

== History ==
=== 1992–2002: Formation ===
Lordi was formed in 1992 as a solo project by Mr Lordi. Lordi's first demo album Napalm Market was done in 1993. The album included the song "Inferno", which also got a music video, all done by Mr Lordi. In the music video, Mr Lordi performed unmasked but he had made monster make-up for his friends who played secondary roles in the video. After the video was done, Mr Lordi got an idea of a band of monsters. "Inferno" was later released in the Finnish "Rockmurskaa" compilation album in 1995. In 1996 Mr Lordi organized a Kiss cruise for Finnish Kiss fans from Finland to Sweden. During the cruise, he met musicians Amen and G-Stealer and told them about his music project called Lordi. After the cruise, they joined the band. One year later Enary joined the band on keyboard and the band recorded their first album, Bend Over and Pray The Lord. At the time when the album was recorded, the band didn't have a drummer and they used MIDI drum tracks in place of a real drummer.

Ari Tiainen, the owner of their record company, had originally planned to publish the album; however, the company did not have sufficient resources to market it. Tiainen recommended Lordi to the record label Kimmo Hirvonen's Records, owned by Anaconda. The album was planned to release in early 1999, but Anaconda Records went bankrupt shortly before the planned release date and the album was never released.

The band never performed with the original line-up, though they had been promised a record release gig in 1999. During the same year, G-Stealer left the band because of work commitments and was replaced by Magnum, whom Mr Lordi had met via Kiss Army Finland. In 2000, drummer Kita joined and the band got their first drummer.

=== 2002–2006: Get Heavy, success in Europe and The Monsterican Dream ===
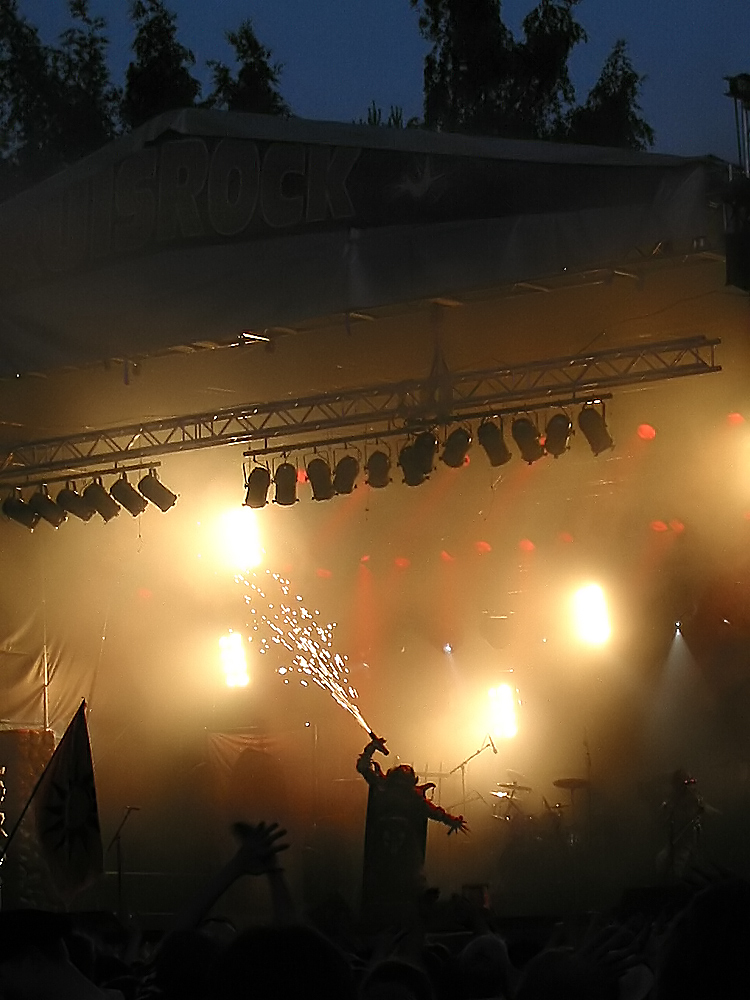
Lordi at 2003 Ruisrock festival

After several failed attempts at obtaining a recording contract, Lordi signed a record deal with Bertelsmann Music Group (BMG) Finland in 2002. In July, the band released their first official single, "Would You Love A Monsterman?", which rose to number one in Finland and spawned a music video. During the summer the band went under the auspices of producer TT Oksala's Finnvox Studios to record their first official album, though the debut recording ran into several problems.

In the autumn of 2002, bassist Magnum was fired and replaced by Kalma. Though Lordi's debut album had already been recorded when Kalma joined, he appeared in the album art and the composition of the accounts. Their debut album Get Heavy was released in November, with a cover design loosely based on Kiss's Love Gun album. The original first sketch of the cover was based on Kiss's Destroyer album. The album won the 2003 Emma award for best domestic hard rock or heavy metal album, and Get Heavy has sold more than 67,000 copies. It was certified platinum in Finland in 2003 and multi-platinum in 2006.

Lordi played their first gig on 8 December 2002, in Helsinki at the Nosturi Club. In 2003, Lordi appeared at several music events in Finland and abroad, especially in Germany, where they played as a part of the Wacken Road Show. During some of the Germany tour, Lordi played as Nightwish's support act. The tour boosted both bands' popularity in Germany and helped them sign a recording contract with the German record company Drakkar. Nightwish had already achieved solid success with joint concerts in Germany and Lordi also raised their profile in Germany.

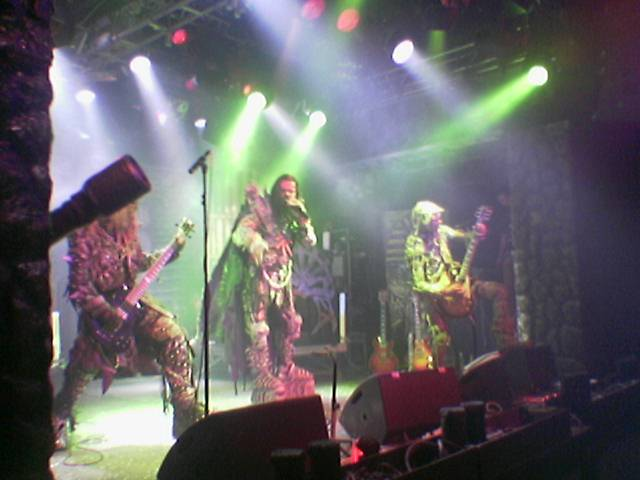
Lordi performing live in 2005

At the beginning of 2004, Lordi began recording their second studio album. This time the album was produced by Hiili Hiilesmaa, with whom the band got along well. This second album was first released on 14 April 2004 as The Monsterican Dream. Two songs from the album, "My Heaven is Your Hell" and "Blood Red Sandman", had been released as singles. Corresponding with the release of the album, the band's costumes and image were also reformed. The special edition of the album also contained a DVD of the band's own short film, The Kin. The film, despite the success of the album it was attached to, has been poorly received. The album went gold two years after its release.

In February 2005 Lordi's first compilation album The Monster Show was released by Sanctuary Records. Sanctuary had originally intended to market a collection of records in the United States, but these plans were halted due to financial problems. Sanctuary, however, published a compilation album in the UK. In Finland, a collection was published by Sony BMG.

The idea of The Monster Show disc collection has its roots in the spring of 2004, around the release of The Monsterican Dream album. Mr Lordi, while interviewing the band Kiss for Inferno magazine, gave the band's bassist/vocalist, Gene Simmons, a copy of Lordi's debut album, Get Heavy (2002). Later, Simmons' assistant announced that Simmons would be willing to publish Lordi's albums in the United States, but if the band would like to share sales revenue, it would be better to publish with Sanctuary Records. Sanctuary did not want to publish either of the studio albums individually and instead preferred a compilation of the best songs. Thus, songs were picked from Get Heavy and The Monsterican Dream, and collected in the compilation album The Monster Show. The collection was published in the spring of 2005 during the European Monstour.

Meanwhile, the internal atmosphere of the band increased in intensity and led to a dispute between members. Later that year, bassist Kalma wanted to resign because of family and financial problems. Mr Lordi tried to persuade Kalma to stay and suggested that he just play the biggest tours and other contractually obligated performances. Kalma, however, did not relent, because he wanted to be involved with the band either in full or not at all. Kalma did, however, play the bass units for the future The Arockalypse album. Kalma left the band just before Lordi entered the Eurovision Song Contest qualifier.

Two new members joined the band, OX and Awa. This change in members spawned more alterations to the band's costumes.

=== 2006–2008: The Arockalypse and Eurovision ===
Lordi's third album The Arockalypse was released on 1 May 2006. On 20 May 2006, Lordi made history by winning the Eurovision Song Contest held in Athens with the song "Hard Rock Hallelujah", becoming the first Finnish group to win the contest and consequently, the first rock/metal act to win; Finland would then send power metal band Teräsbetoni in 2008. The song scored 292 points, which was then an all-time points record. Pasi Rantanen from the band Thunderstone performed backing vocals, wearing a Gene Simmons Kiss mask.

Lordi opened the fall of 2006 with the Bringing Back the Balls to Europe tour; the concert DVD was released in February 2007 as Bringing Back the Balls to Stockholm 2006. The tour ended with a surprise: during the last gig in London, on 31 October 2006, the band's former bassist, Kalma, was seen as a guest on stage.

In November 2006, Lordi headlined the MTV Europe Music Awards, and Mr Lordi presented the "Best Rock" award. Around the same time, Bill Aucoin, best known as the original manager of Kiss, became Lordi's manager. In the spring of 2007, Lordi created the Bringing Back the Balls tour, which toured Japan and the Baltic countries. In May, the band was involved in the Eurovision Song Contest 2007 held in Helsinki, and opened the competition with their winning song "Hard Rock Hallelujah".

In early summer 2007 in Oulu, the members of Lordi participated in filming of the horror film Dark Floors, which premiered on 8 February 2008. In July 2007, Lordi toured North America with the Ozzfest festival, but ended up canceling off-date shows during that tour.

After the Ozzfest tour ended in late August, Lordi went on a short break. In September, it was announced that the band would go on a new tour of the U.S. with the band Type O Negative, beginning on 12 October 2007 and ending on 31 October 2007. At the end of the tour the band returned to Finland to record the theme song, "Beast Loose in Paradise", for the 2008 film, Dark Floors.

=== 2008–2012: Deadache, Babez for Breakfast and Otus' death ===
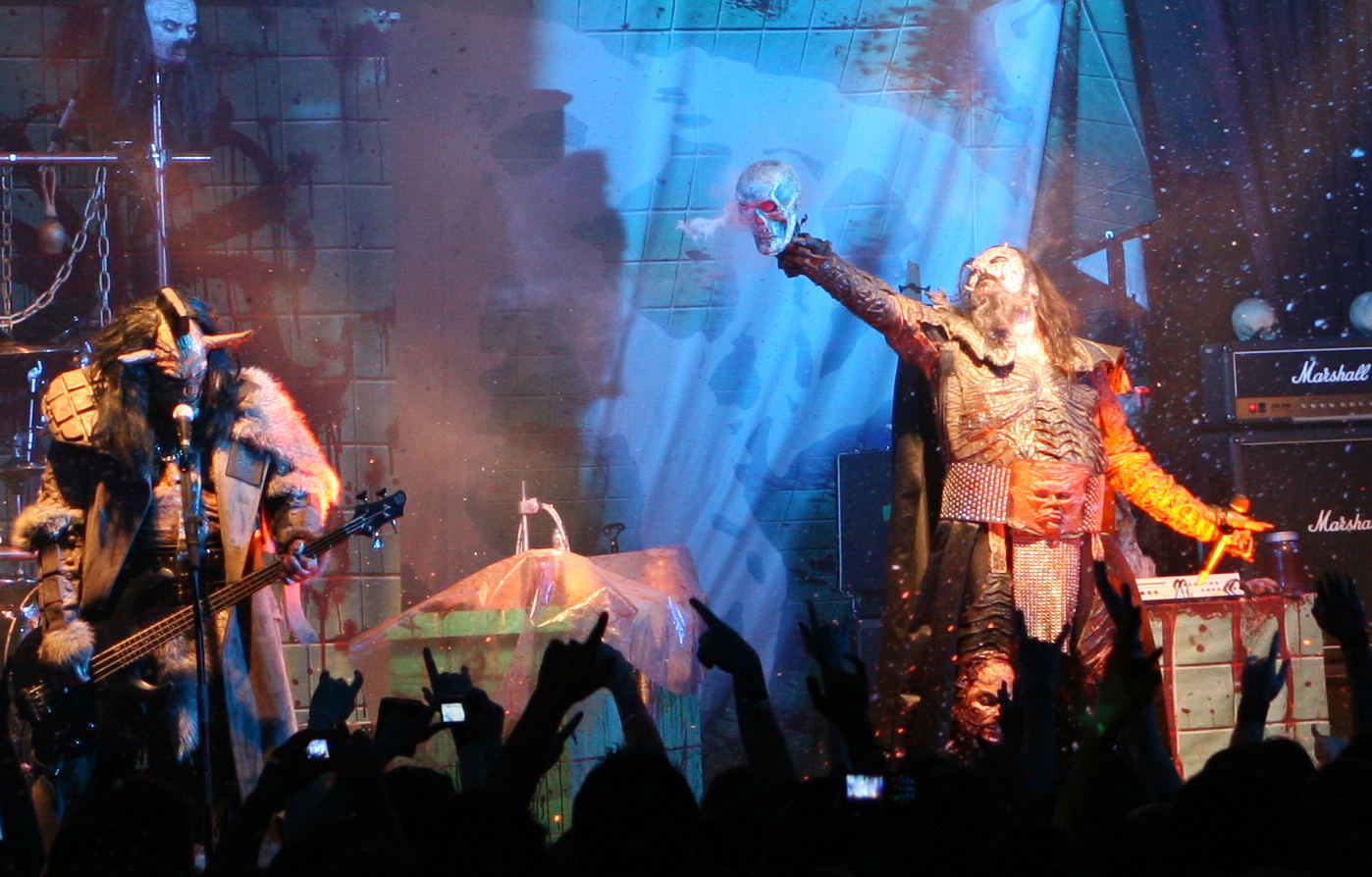
Lordi performing in Barcelona in 2009

Lordi began recording their fourth album in the spring of 2008 and the album was released on 29 October 2008. The album, Deadache, was produced by Nino Laurenne. The release spurred yet another change in the band's costumes. The album was similar in style to its predecessors, melodic hard rock and heavy metal, though with more of a horror theme. Prior to the completion of the disc, it was revealed that it featured more piano solos than its predecessors, and that the recital "Missing Miss Charlene" featured a child singing. The album's first single was called "Bite It Like a Bulldog", and it was published on 3 September 2008.

Lordi announced before the release of the album that Deadache would be marketed internationally, like its immediate predecessor.

"It goes without saying that the song contest of the last album distorted the situation, and this can not be sold in any case, the same number in Europe or, especially in Finland. We know that Finland is likely to disc stamped with the flop, even if it would sell double platinum, it does not sell 100,000 copies", Mr Lordi said in August 2008.

Shortly after the publication of Deadache, Lordi made a tour of the United States in November in conjunction with Lizzy Borden. Lordi performed "Bite It Like a Bulldog" on the NBC show Late Night with Conan O'Brien on 6 November 2008.

Mr Lordi spent a week in Los Angeles with Jeremy Rubolino and former Kiss guitarist Bruce Kulick writing two new tracks, "Cut Off My Head" and "Call Off The Wedding". In March 2010 Mark Slaughter and Bruce Kulick played in a part of their new song. Babez for Breakfast was recorded in Nashville, and produced by legendary Michael Wagener. The first single, called "This is Heavy Metal", from the album was released in August 2010, with the album following in September.

On 4 October 2010 it was announced that drummer Kita had left the band, and on 16 October, OX posted on his Twitter account they had found a new drummer. On 26 October 2010, it was announced on Lordi's website that Otus had become their new drummer. Otus joined the band just before Lordi's Europe for Breakfast tour started.

In 2011 Mr Lordi took part in Finnish TV-series "Kuorosota" and because of that reason the band could not make a long tour. However, they played at a few metal festivals.

On 15 February 2012, it was announced that Otus had died. Due to the death of Otus, Lordi canceled all their concerts scheduled for the beginning of 2012, but they had some summer festival concerts that they couldn't cancel. Lordi got help from Jimmy Hammer, the drummer of Finnish band Ironcross, who played drums for Lordi's 2012 concerts. Jimmy Hammer used a monster disguise to fit in the band, and was only called "the drummer". His identity was told after.

In September 2012, Scarchives Vol. 1, a compilation CD+DVD, was released to celebrate Lordi's 20th anniversary. The CD contains previously unreleased old Lordi songs, including all the songs from the unreleased album from 1997, Bend Over And Pray The Lord. The DVD contains Lordi's first concert in Helsinki 2002. The video was edited by Otus.

Keyboardist Awa left the band in the fall of 2012. She was seen for the last time during Lordi's 20th anniversary concert, at Simerock in Rovaniemi, Finland on 11 August.

=== 2012–2018: To Beast or Not to Beast to Monstereophonic ===
Lordi began recording their sixth studio album on 1 September 2012 with two new members, Mana as the new drummer and Hella as the new keyboardist. This album was recorded at WireWorld Studio in Nashville, and produced and mixed by Michael Wagener, like the previous one. The first single from the new album, "The Riff", was released digitally on 8 February 2013. The studio album To Beast or Not to Beast was recorded in March 2013.

After the release of the single, the band took part in Wok WM competition in Germany. The album was released on 1 March 2013. A European tour in support of the new album, "Tour Beast Or Not Tour Beast", started in April 2013. The tour also included one concert in Japan.

Lordi started the recordings for their seventh studio album on 2 June in Finnish Finnvox studios with the producer Mikko Karmila. In July the band moved to a secret place in Lapland to continue the recordings.

On 28 June in Savonlinna, Finland the first official Lordi-exhibition was opened, The Other Side of Lordi. There Lordi's former costumes and stage props were shown, including Lordi's album cover artworks (painted by Mr Lordi). Mr Lordi and Amen visited the exhibition during the opening night.

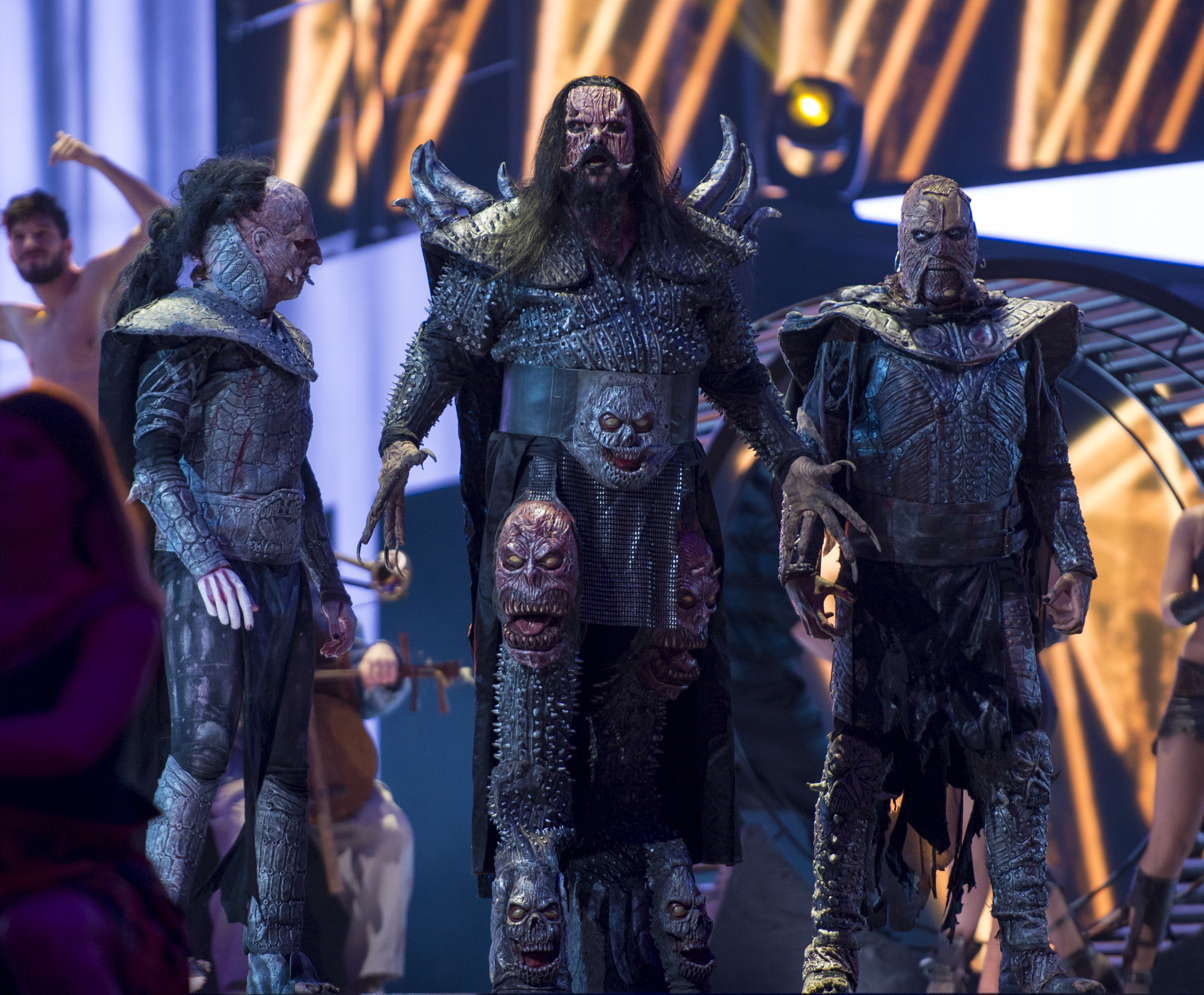
Lordi, appearing in the interval act for the Eurovision Song Contest 2016

On 31 July 2014, the group announced that the title of their seventh studio album would be Scare Force One. The album was recorded in June and was released on 31 October in Europe, 3 November in North America, and 26 November in Japan with a bonus track. The first single from the album, "Nailed by the Hammer of Frankenstein", was released digitally on 19 September.

On 1 November Lordi performed at The Circus in Helsinki to promote the release of the album. The three-month-long European tour "Tour Force One" started on 1 February 2015 and ended in early April.

In early 2015, it was announced via Facebook that Hella was pregnant. The band's guitarist, Amen, later confirmed that Hella would be replaced for the summer festivals. In the summer of 2015, Hella's temporary replacement, Nalle (Finnish for Teddy Bear), was seen for the first time at Rovaniemi. In November Lordi played 2 gigs in Russia (Saint Petersburg and Moscow), still with Hella. In late 2015, the band announced that a new album was in the works. Recording began in December but was halted after the death of Mr Lordi's father.

On 27 February 2016, Lordi performed "Hard Rock Hallelujah" in the Finnish Eurovision final, as special guests.

On 14 May 2016, Lordi appeared in the interval act for the Eurovision Song Contest 2016, in a musical number satirising Eurovision songs.

In April 2016, recording began again, with producer Nino Laurenne, who had previously produced Deadache in 2008. In an interview for "Spark TV", Mr. Lordi stated that the new album will be released in September. The album, untitled at the time, was described by Mr. Lordi as a "split album". The first six songs of the album will sound like normal Lordi songs, while the last six songs will be more progressive and will follow a concept. A promotional tour for the album called "European Monstour-2016" began in October 2016.

The single from the album, "Hug You Hardcore", was released in August 2016. A music video for the song was later released. Lordi announced the title of their eighth studio album, Monstereophonic (Theaterror vs. Demonarchy) on 13 July, which was released on 16 September. Later the band toured North America in 2017.

=== 2018–2020: Sexorcism and departure of OX ===
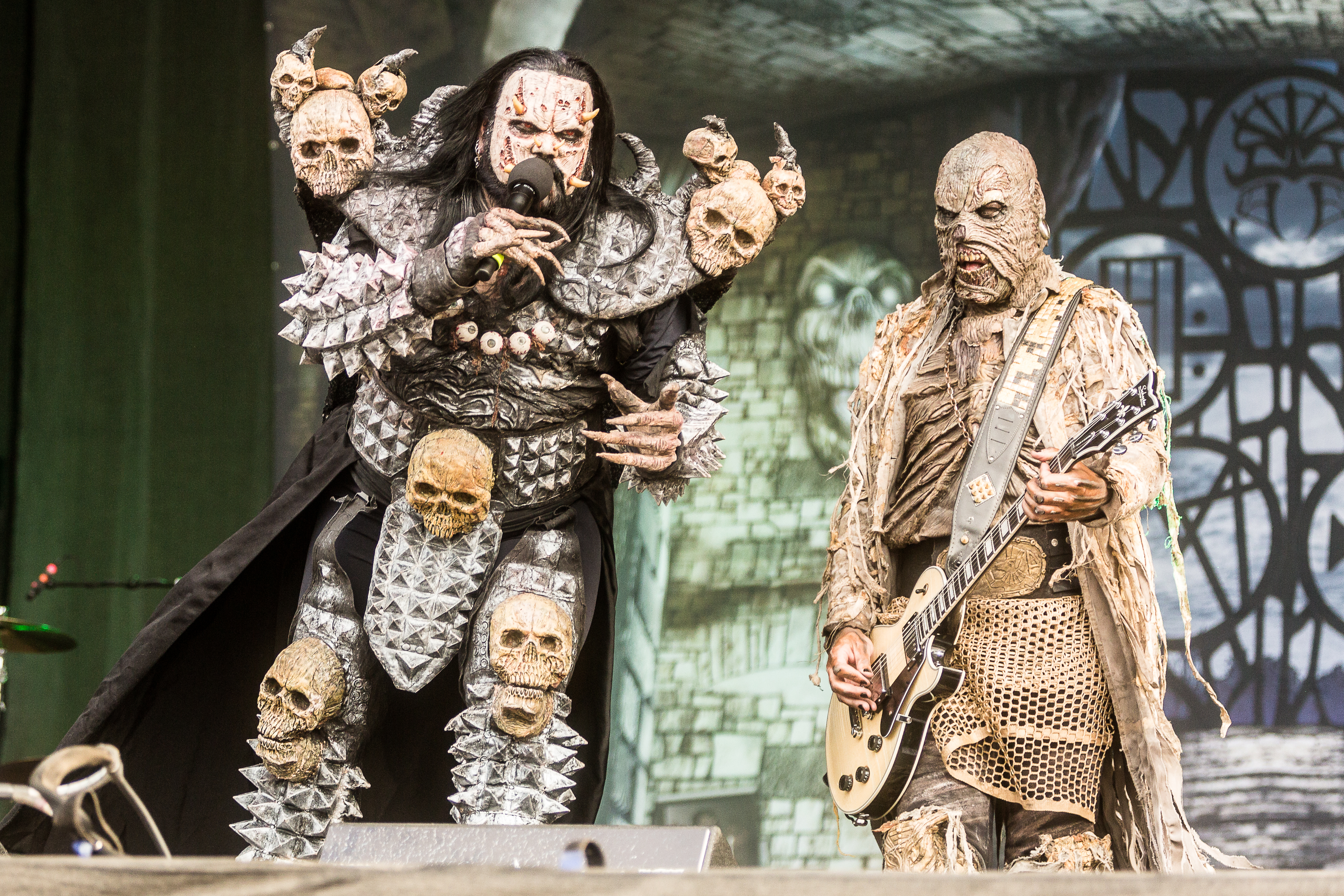
Lordi performing at Rockharz Open Air 2019

On 9 March 2018, the band announced the name of the ninth album Sexorcism along with its album cover. It was released on 25 May 2018. The band promised that it would be possibly their "most controversial" record to date. Their single from the album "Your Tongue's Got the Cat" was released on 13 April 2018. The second single off of the album titled "Naked in My Cellar" was released on 4 May 2018 along with a music video.

Following four festival shows in the summer, a tour in support of the album called "Sextourcism" began in Europe on 9 October in Amstelveen, Netherlands and concluded on 28 December in Helsinki, Finland.

Lordi announced their third live DVD Recordead Live – Sextourcism in Z7 on 17 May 2019, which was recorded on 23 November 2018 in Pratteln, Switzerland during their tour. It was released on 26 July 2019.

OX announced on 14 March 2019 that he would be departing the band after performing with them for the summer festivals that year. His final show with the band took place at the Reload Festival in Sulingen, Germany on 23 August 2019.

The band later introduced their new bass player, Hiisi. Hiisi's first show with the band took place at the Ice Hall in Helsinki on 13 December 2019 as the band was the opening act for Beast in Black.

=== 2020–2022: Killection, Lordiversity and Amen's departure ===
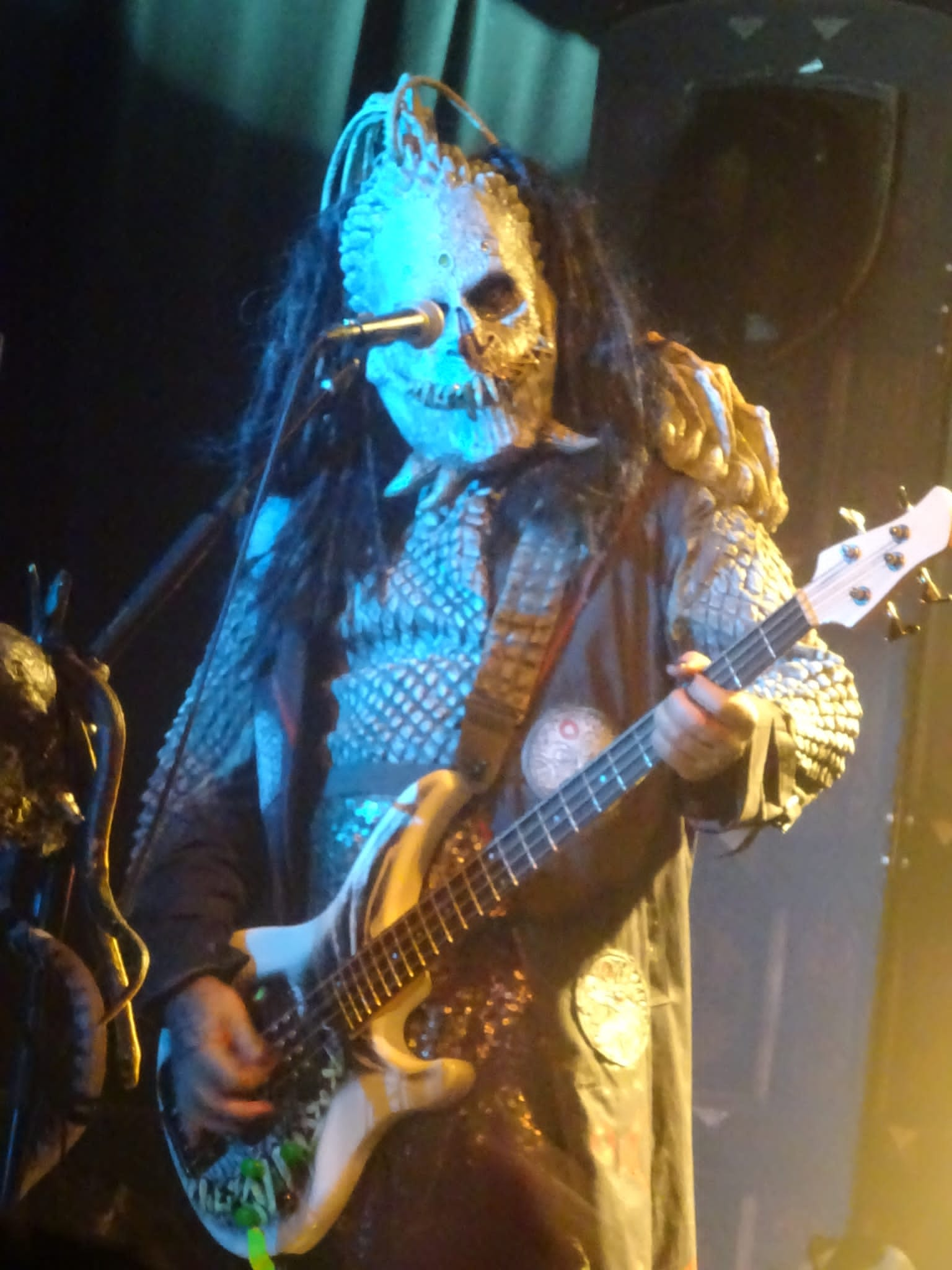
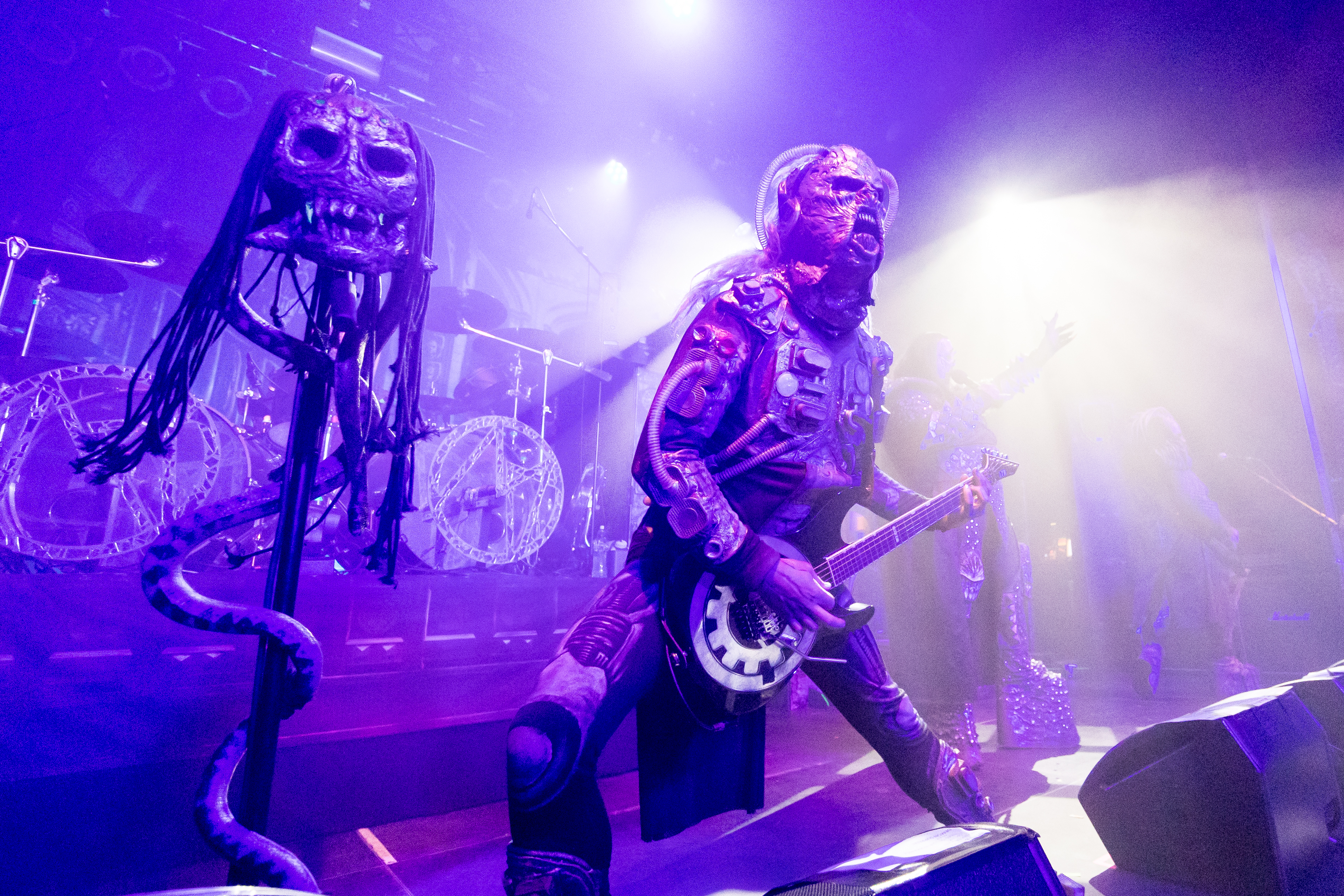
(Left): Hiisi performing with Lordi in Barcelona in 2020; (right): Kone performing with Lordi in 2022

On 27 September 2019, Lordi announced the title of their tenth album Killection. It was released on 31 January 2020, followed by a European tour titled "Killectour" in support of the album the same year. The band has said that this album is considered a 'fictional compilation' album and would contain songs you would normally hear in the early 1970s to mid-1990s. Their single from the album "Shake the Baby Silent", was released on 8 November 2019. Their second single off the album, "I Dug a Hole in the Yard for You", was released on 29 November 2019 along with a music video. The third single off the album, "Like a Bee to the Honey", was released on 17 January 2020.

During the COVID-19 pandemic, the band performed a special livestream called "Scream Stream" on 22 May 2020 at the Paha Kurki Rockhouse in the band's hometown of Rovaniemi, performing various hits and rarities played by request as well as answering questions from fans.

It was announced on 25 March 2021 that Lordi would be performing at the Eurovision Song Contest 2021, joining five other previous winners in Rotterdam on 22 May 2021, performing their Eurovision-winning song "Hard Rock Hallelujah" for the Rock the Roof interval act.

On 6 April 2021, it was announced that Lordi would be releasing no less than seven studio albums in October 2021. In the statement regarding the albums, the band said: "The albums will sound all different from each other, they're all in different styles and fictional eras in the Killection timeline. Five of the seven albums are already done, by the way, and number six is well on the way."

On 19 August 2021, the band released their single "Believe Me", and simultaneously announced Lordiversity, a box set that consists of the band's eleventh to seventeenth studio albums: Skelectric Dinosaur, Superflytrap, The Masterbeast from the Moon, Abusement Park, Humanimals, Abracadaver, and Spooky Sextravaganza Spectacular. The boxset was released on 26 November 2021. The second single, "Abracadaver", was released on 24 September 2021. The third single, "Borderline", was released on 22 October 2021, along with a music video. On 24 November 2021, the fourth single "Merry Blah Blah Blah" was released. The fifth single "Demon Supreme" was released on 17 December 2021. The sixth single "Day Off of the Devil" was released on 7 January 2022.

On 5 May 2022, it was announced that Amen had departed from the band. Mr Lordi released a statement the following day regarding this, clarifying that he had asked Amen to leave the band at the end of February 2022 due to growing tensions. Kone was later named as the new guitarist on 30 May 2022. Kone's first show with the band took place at the Rock in the City Festival in Kuopio, Finland on 10 June 2022.

=== 2022–present: Screem Writers Guild and Limited Deadition ===
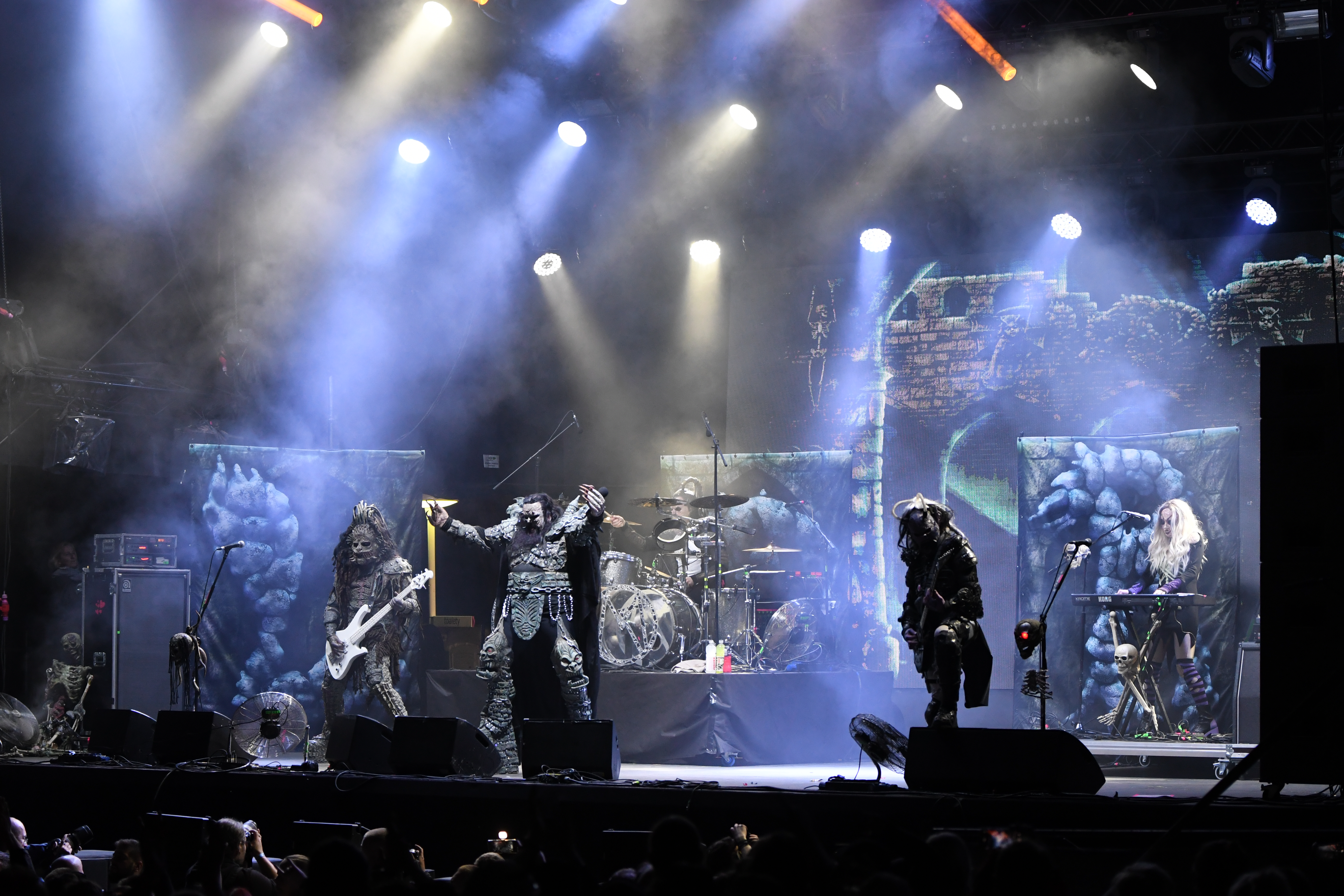
Lordi performing live in 2023

On 21 November 2022, Lordi announced that they had signed with the record label, Atomic Fire Records. Along with that news, they simultaneously added that their eighteenth studio album would be released in Spring 2023. The album's title, Screem Writers Guild, was announced on 1 January 2023, although the title was previously announced in the band's biography Lordiary. The track list for the album was later revealed on 26 January 2023, along with the first single, "Lucyfer Prime Evil". The album was released on 31 March 2023. Two more singles were released to promote the album: "Thing in the Cage" and "Dead Again Jayne".

Following the release of the album, Lordi joined Sabaton and Babymetal as an opening act for the European leg of their tour, "The Tour To End All Tours". Lordi were later featured on the front cover of the fashion magazine Vogue Scandinavia.

On 29 June 2024, Mr Lordi confirmed in an interview with Chaoszine that their nineteenth studio album was already finished, and would be released in Spring 2025. The band released a standalone single, "Made of Metal", in collaboration with OnePlus on 5 August 2024. The band later announced their nineteenth studio album, Limited Deadition, which was released on 21 March 2025. The album was promoted with three singles: "Syntax Terror", "Retropolis" and "Hellizabeth".

On 2 April 2026, the band were announced as a spokesband for the Swedish recycling campaign Pantamera, and released a song called "Pantamera (Pan-Tah-Meh-Rah!)". The band collaborated with Noora Louhimo on a cover of Johnny Logan's song "Hold Me Now", which was released on 16 May 2026. In the summer of 2026, the band performed at various European festivals in support of the 20th anniversary of The Arockalypse.

== Style ==
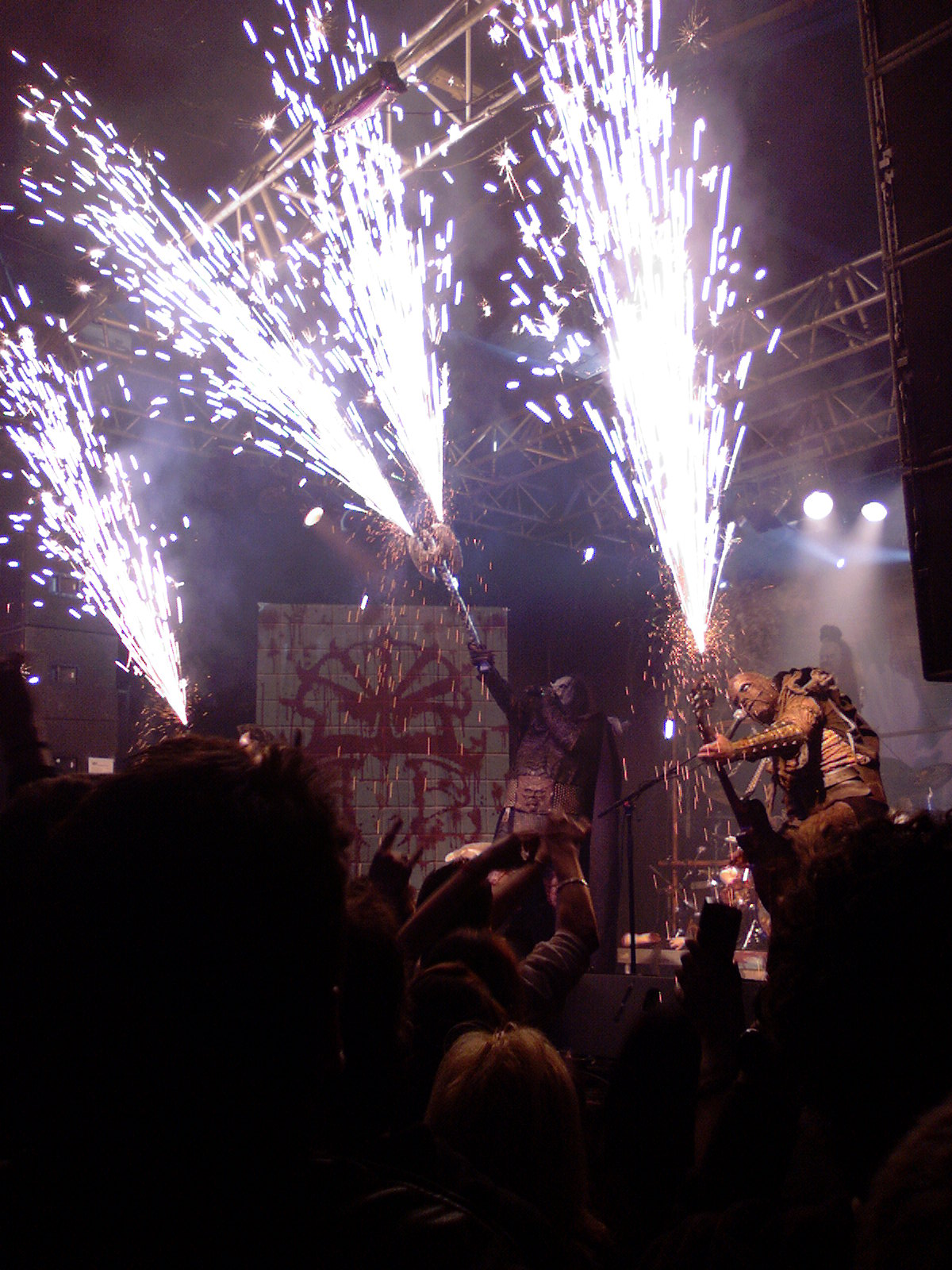
Lordi performing live with pyrotechnics

=== Musical style ===
The band's horror-related albums, the monster costumes worn by all band members, and the horror elements of their performances are hallmarks of shock rock. The band was mostly influenced by Kiss, but also by Alice Cooper, Iron Maiden, W.A.S.P. and Twisted Sister.

=== Costumes and masks ===
Lordi members have stated that their costumes were inspired by Kiss and the horror genre. Mr Lordi himself has said that without Kiss, Lordi probably would not exist. The monster masks and costumes the band use are made of foam latex, with some other materials like canvas, metal and leather. The masks and costumes of Lordi are all and always made by Mr Lordi himself. As a professional make-up artist and sculptor, Mr Lordi has the necessary knowledge to produce those things easily. The band members do each other's makeup. The band updates their outfits and masks for each new album.

It takes the other band members about one hour to put their masks and costumes on, though it takes Mr Lordi two to three hours to put on his. He has also said that the materials for suits cost "a few hundred euros".

==== Unmasked by the media ====
On 24 May 2006, the Finnish tabloid magazine 7 Päivää (Seven Days) published an old picture of Mr Lordi's face on the front page, and two days later another tabloid, Katso! ("Look!"), published unmasked pictures of the other four band members. Both magazines were heavily criticized by their readers for publishing these pictures, which led to swift apologies from both magazines and promises not to publish unmasked pictures of Lordi anymore.

== Tributes ==
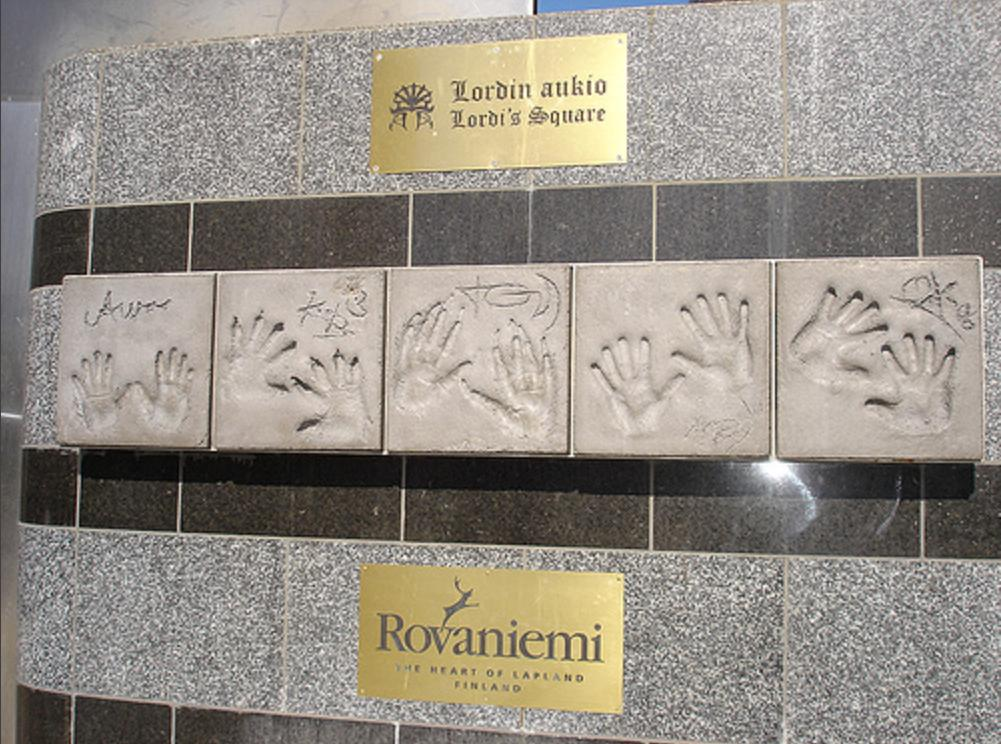
The sign at Lordi's Square in Rovaniemi

Lordi's Square, in the center of Rovaniemi, Finland, the hometown of the lead singer Mr Lordi, was renamed shortly after the band's victory at the Eurovision Song Contest. It was part of a redevelopment of the Rovaniemi city center.

Itella, the Finnish postal service, issued a Lordi postage stamp in May 2007 in recognition of their Eurovision win. Itella had already released Lordi's Christmas single, "It Snows in Hell" in a special Christmas card edition.

A brand of soda, "Lordi Cola", was named after them and was launched in September 2006, featuring labels designed by Mr Lordi, several depicting individual members and one featuring the whole band.

The 2.6.17-rc5 version of the Linux kernel was named after Lordi.

A themed restaurant named "Lordi's Rocktaurant" opened on Koskikatu Street near Lordi's Square in Rovaniemi in 2006, with stage props and costumes the band used. The restaurant expanded to the Rinteenkulma shopping center in 2008, but closed in 2011 after its rental contract ran out, having reportedly been in financial difficulties the previous year.

== Band members ==
Lordi live at Metal Frenzy Open Air 2025

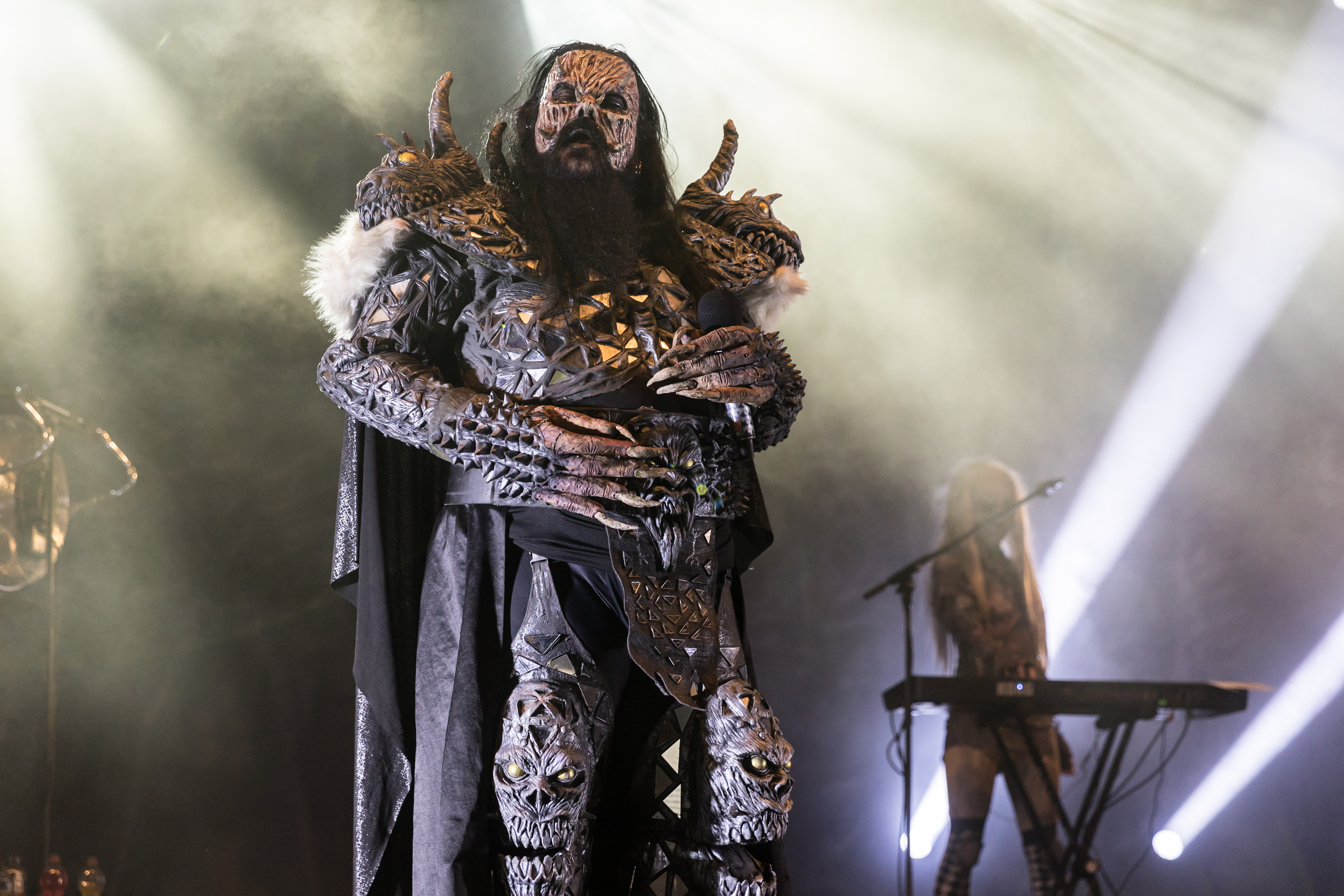
Mr Lordi

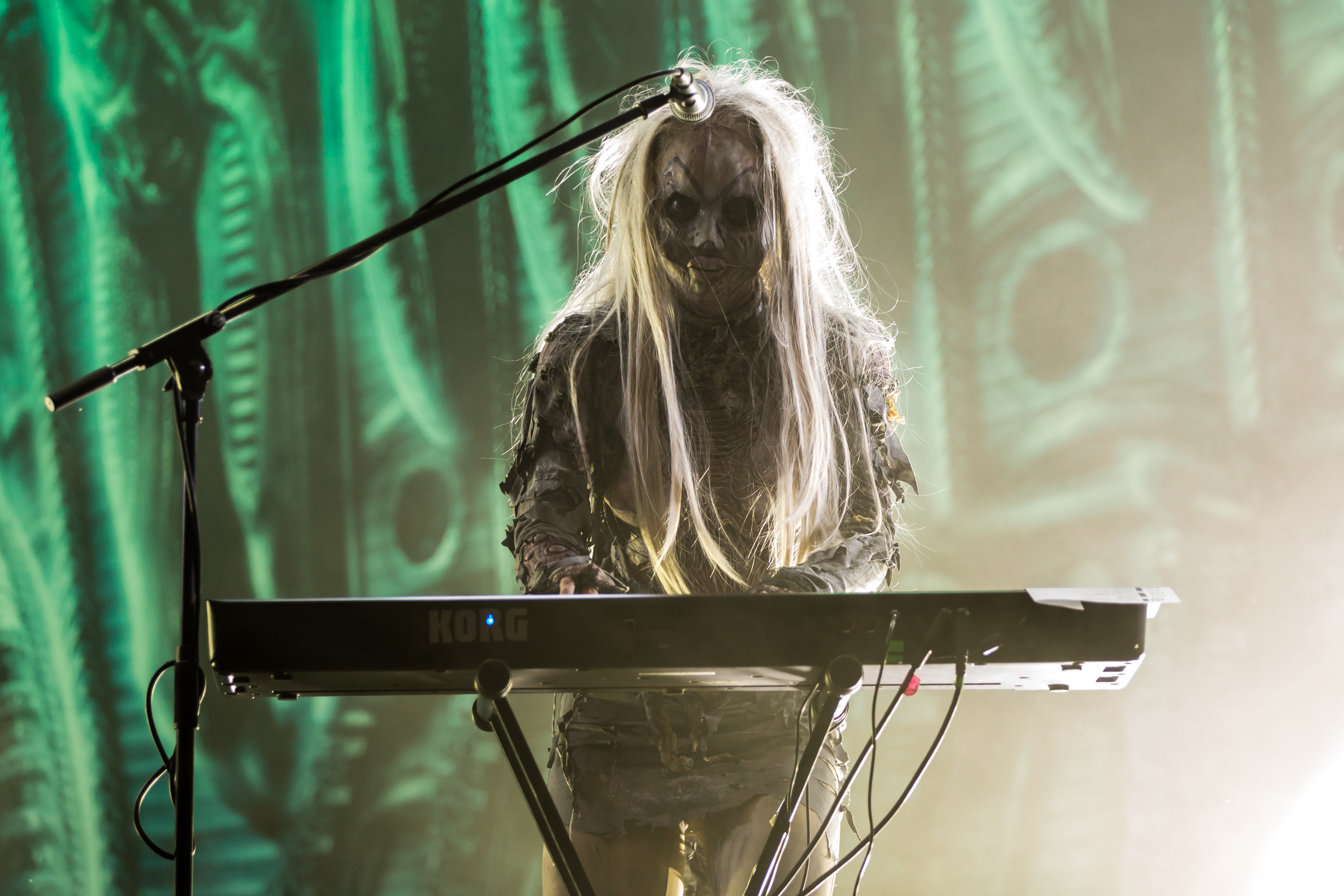
Hella

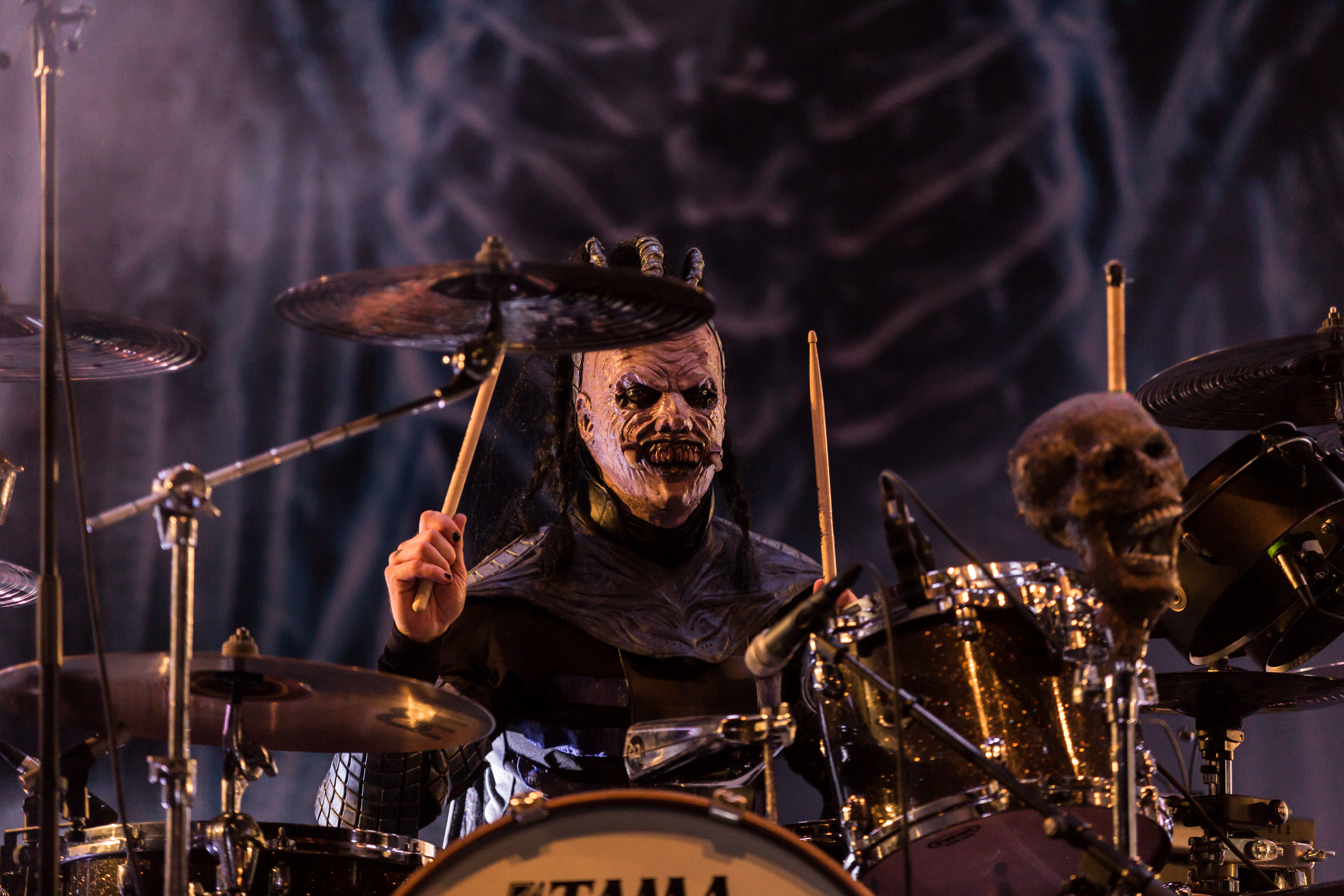
Mana

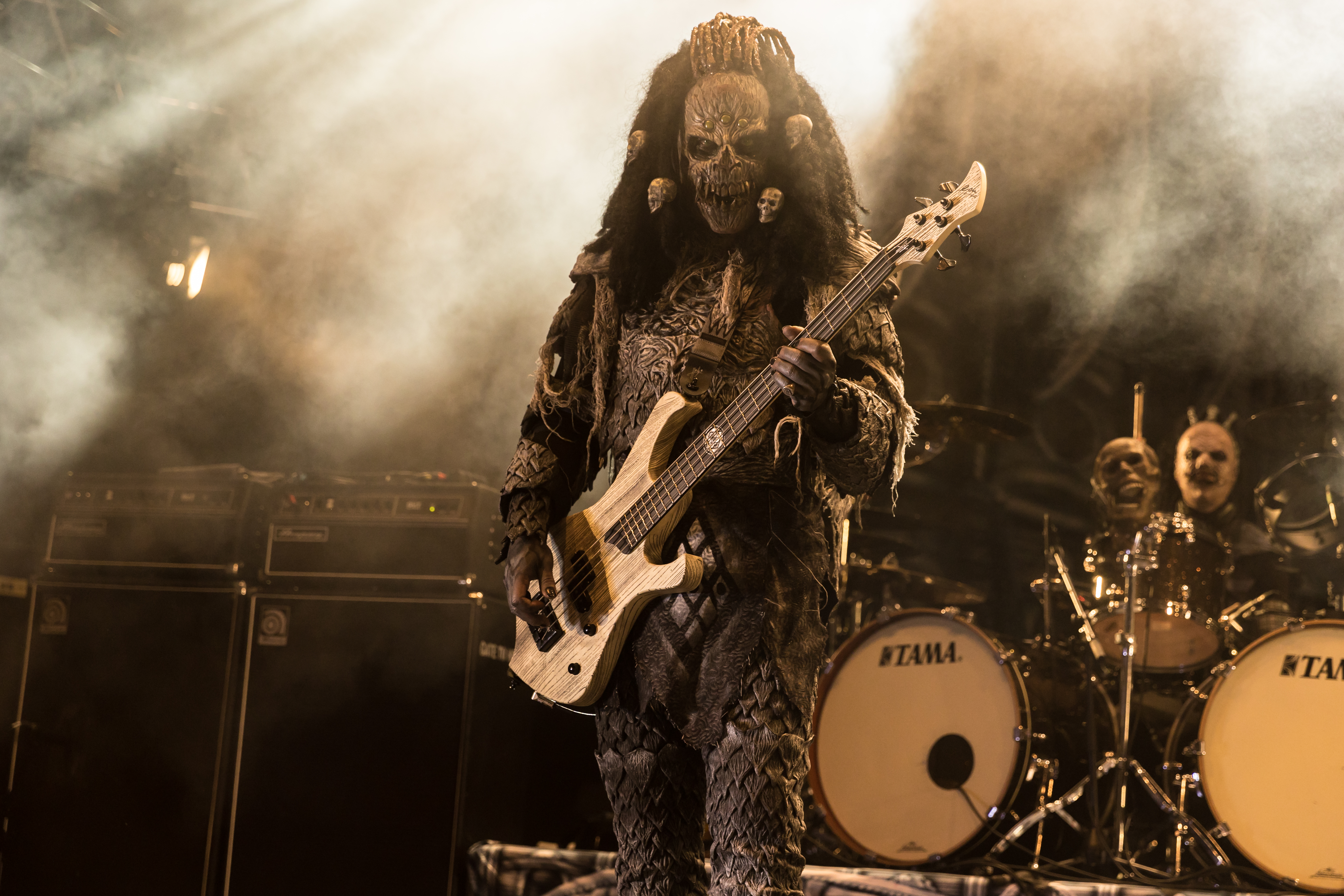
Hiisi

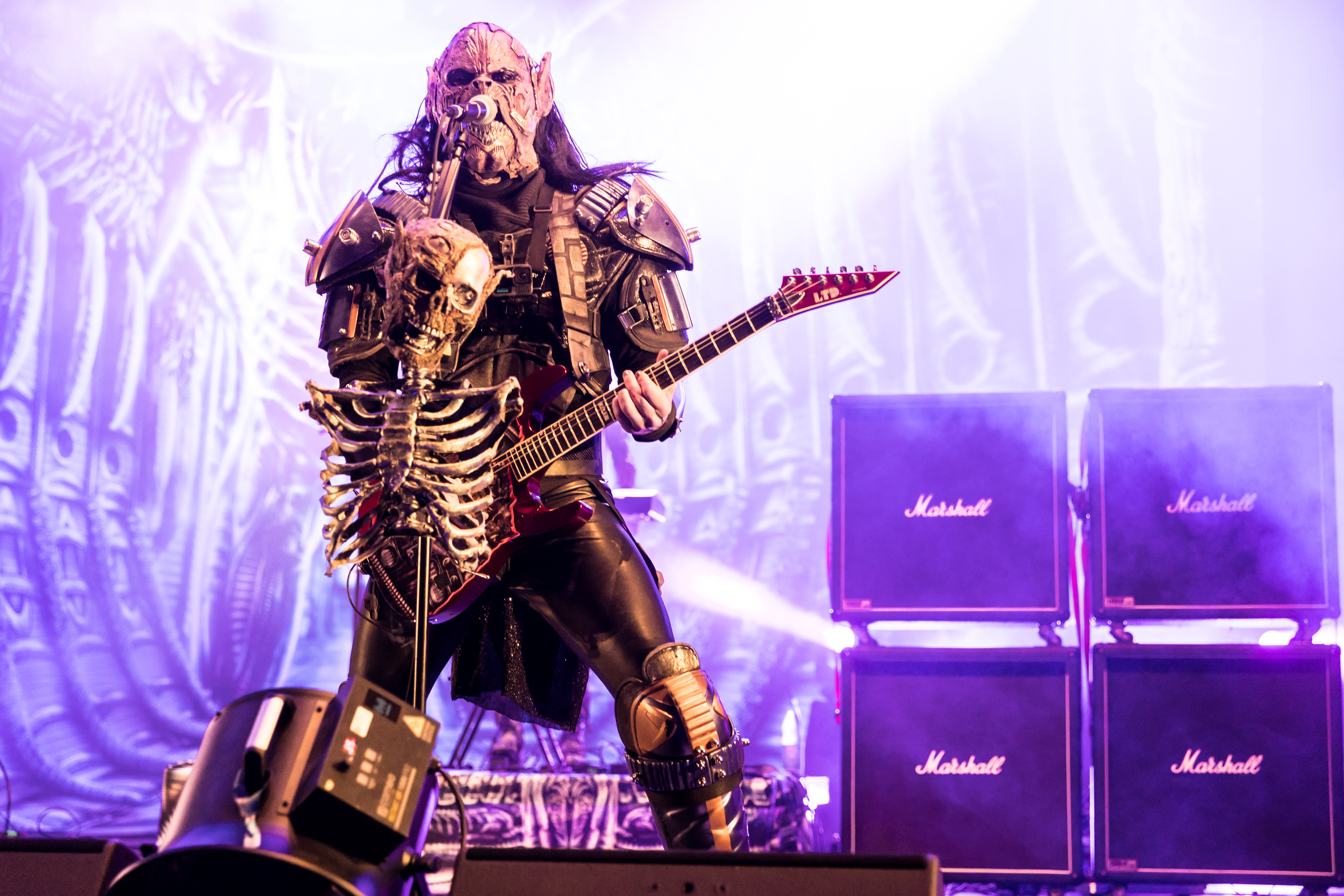
Kone

Current

- Mr Lordi (Tomi Putaansuu) – lead vocals (1996–present), drums (1996–2000), guitar (2016, 2021), keyboards (1996–1997), backing vocals (2018, 2021–present)
- Hella (Henna-Riikka Broda) – keyboards (2012–present), lead vocals (2014), backing vocals (2012–2015, 2019–present)
- Mana (Antto Tuomainen) – drums (2012–present), backing vocals (2014–present)
- Hiisi – bass (2019–present), backing vocals (2023–present)
- Kone – guitar (2022–present) backing vocals (2023–present)

Touring

- Jimmy "The Drummer" Hammer – drums (2012)
- Nalle – keyboards (2015, 2017, 2023, 2025)

Former

- G-Stealer (Sami Keinänen) – bass (1996–1999)
- Magnum (Sami Wolking) – bass (1999–2002)
- Kalma (Niko Hurme / Nick Gore) – bass (2002–2005), backing vocals (2004–2005)
- Enary (Erna Siikavirta) – keyboards (1997–2005), backing vocals (1997–2005)
- Kita (Sampsa Astala) – drums, backing vocals (2000–2010)
- Otus (Tonmi Lillman) – drums (2010–2012; his death)
- Awa (Leena Peisa) – keyboards (2005–2012)
- OX (Samer el Nahhal) – bass (2005–2019)
- Amen (Jussi Sydänmaa) – guitar (1996–2022), backing vocals (1996–2004, 2010–2014, 2018)

== Discography ==
Studio albums

- Get Heavy (2002)
- The Monsterican Dream (2004)
- The Arockalypse (2006)
- Deadache (2008)
- Babez for Breakfast (2010)
- To Beast or Not to Beast (2013)
- Scare Force One (2014)
- Monstereophonic (2016)
- Sexorcism (2018)
- Killection (2020)
- Lordiversity (2021)
  - Skelectric Dinosaur
  - Superflytrap
  - The Masterbeast from the Moon
  - Abusement Park
  - Humanimals
  - Abracadaver
  - Spooky Sextravaganza Spectacular
- Screem Writers Guild (2023)
- Limited Deadition (2025)

== Filmography ==
- The Kin (2004)
- Dark Floors (2008)
- Monsterman (2014)

== See also ==
- List of best-selling music artists in Finland

Awards and achievements
Preceded by (Greece) Helena Paparizou with "My Number One"	Winner of the Eurovision Song Contest; 2006	Succeeded by (Serbia) Marija Šerifović with "Molitva"
Preceded by Geir Rönning with "Why?"	Finland in the Eurovision Song Contest; 2006	Succeeded by Hanna Pakarinen with "Leave Me Alone"
