= Sexorcism (Lordi album) =

Studio album by Lordi
- Released: 25 May 2018
- Recorded: October – December 2017
- Studio: Finnvox Studios (Helsinki); Birdrock Electric (Aitolahti)
- Genre: Hard rock; heavy metal
- Length: 62:40
- Label: AFM
- Producer: Mikko Karmila

Lordi chronology
Monstereophonic (Theaterror vs. Demonarchy) (2016)	Sexorcism (2018)	Killection (2020)

Singles from Sexorcism
- 1. "Your Tongue's Got the Cat" Released: 13 April 2018; 2. "Naked in My Cellar" Released: 4 May 2018

Sexorcism is the ninth studio album by the Finnish rock band Lordi. It was released on 25 May 2018 via AFM Records. The album was described in a press release as possibly their most controversial record to date, and a "full-on and uncensored shot of Lordi brand hard rock and roll".

It is the final studio album to feature longtime member OX on bass guitar.

== Track listing ==
No.	Title	Lyrics	Music	Length
1.	"Sexorcism"	Mr Lordi, Tracy Lipp	Mr Lordi	6:52
2.	"Your Tongue's Got the Cat"	Mr Lordi, Lipp	Mr Lordi	4:45
3.	"Romeo Ate Juliet"	Mr Lordi, Lipp	Mr Lordi	4:21
4.	"Naked in My Cellar"	Mr Lordi, Lipp	Mr Lordi, Mana	4:45
5.	"The Beast Is Yet to Cum"	Mr Lordi, Lipp	Mr Lordi, OX	4:50
6.	"Polterchrist"	Mr Lordi, Lipp	Mr Lordi	5:23
7.	"SCG9: The Documented Phenomenon"	Mr Lordi, Lipp, Ralph Ruiz	Mr Lordi	1:14
8.	"Slashion Model Girls"	Mr Lordi, Lipp	Mr Lordi	5:25
9.	"Rimskin Assassin"	Mr Lordi, Lipp	Mr Lordi, OX	4:50
10.	"Hell Has Room (No Vacancy in Heaven)"	Mr Lordi, Lipp	Mr Lordi, Amen	5:04
11.	"Hot & Satanned"	Mr Lordi, Lipp	Mr Lordi, OX	4:33
12.	"Sodomesticated Animal"	Mr Lordi, Lipp	Mr Lordi	4:23
13.	"Haunting Season"	Mr Lordi, Lipp	Mr Lordi, Hella	6:15
Total length:				62:40

== Personnel ==
All information from the album booklet.

Lordi

- Mr Lordi – lead and backing vocals, songwriting, lyrics, artwork, cover, layout
- Amen – guitars, backing vocals, songwriting
- OX – bass, songwriting
- Mana – drums, backing vocals, songwriting, recording
- Hella – keyboards, songwriting

Additional musicians

- Netta Laurenne – backing vocals
- Isabella Larsson – acapella vocals on "Polterchrist"
- Tracy Lipp – backing vocals, recording, lyrics
- Dylan Broda – backing vocals
- Jessica Love – backing vocals
- Ralph Ruiz – backing vocals, lyrics on "SCG9: The Documented Phenomenon"
- Tom Roine – backing vocals

Production

- Mikko Karmila – producer, recording, mixing
- Mika Jussila – mastering
- Eero Kokko – photography

== Charts ==
Chart (2018)	Peak position
Austrian Albums (Ö3 Austria)	74
Finnish Albums (Suomen virallinen lista)	19
German Albums (Offizielle Top 100)	20
Japanese Albums (Oricon)	246
Swiss Albums (Schweizer Hitparade)	64
