= The Riff (Lordi song) =

Single by Lordi

from the album To Beast or Not to Beast
- Released: 8 February 2013
- Genre: Hard rock, heavy metal
- Length: 3:47
- Label: Sony Music
- Songwriters: Tracy Lipp, Amen, Mr Lordi
- Producer: Michael Wagener

Lordi singles chronology
"This Is Heavy Metal" (2010)	"The Riff" (2013)	"Nailed by the Hammer of Frankenstein" (2014)

Music video
- "The Riff" on YouTube

"The Riff" is a song by the Finnish rock band Lordi. It is the first and only single from the album To Beast or Not to Beast, released on 8 February 2013. The band has also made a music video for the song. It's also the first Lordi song that has been released also as an official lyrics video.

Lordi performed "The Riff" in a German television competition Wok WM in 2013. The song is also featured in a Pinball Rocks app game.

== Track listing ==
1. "The Riff" (3:47)

== Music video ==
The music video of "The Riff" was filmed exclusively in Czech Republic, in a local supermarket Albert. The video was filmed by Martin Muller. A Czech playmate Dominika Jandlova is featured in the video. The music video got censored by the label Sony Music; they didn't let Dominika Jandlova appear naked in the video.

== The song ==
The lyrics speak figuratively about a near-death experience narrated in the first person. The narrator meets and is offered transport by the grim reaper, which he tries to refuse. The grim reaper insists he "take a peek", referencing visions of the afterlife frequently encountered in near-death experiences. The grim reaper plays a song on guitar and asks the narrator for his honest opinion, to which he uncomfortably replies that "the riff is a killer, but the rest is a throw-away". The grim reaper subsequently dies, and the narrator plagiarises his song, signifying resuscitation and drawing inspiration from the experience.
