= Dark Floors =

Dark Floors – The Lordi Motion Picture
- Theatrical release poster
- Directed by: Pete Riski
- Written by: Pekka Lehtosaari
- Story by: Mr Lordi; Pete Riski
- Produced by: Markus Selin
- Starring: Lordi; Skye Bennett; Noah Huntley; Dominique McElligott; Ronald Pickup; William Hope
- Cinematography: Jean-Noel Mustonen
- Edited by: Antti Kulmala; Joona Louhivuori; Stefan Sundlof
- Music by: Ville Riippa
- Production companies: The Icelandic FilmCompany; Kisi Production
- Distributed by: Solar Films; Nordisk Film
- Release date: 8 February 2008
- Running time: 85 minutes
- Country: Finland
- Language: English
- Budget: €4.2 million
- Box office: $645,855

Dark Floors – The Lordi Motion Picture is a 2008 English-language Finnish horror film that features members of the rock band Lordi playing the monsters. Band frontman Mr Lordi also designed the film's logo. The film was released in February 2008 and stars William Hope, Leon Herbert, Philip Bretherton, Ronald Pickup, and Skye Bennett. A new Lordi song, Beast Loose in Paradise, is featured in the end credits of the film.

== Plot ==
A young, autistic girl at a hospital holds the key to defeating other-dimensional monsters that seek to kill everyone.

== Cast ==
- William Hope as Jon
- Leon Herbert as Rick
- Ronald Pickup as Tobias
- Philip Bretherton as Walter
- Noah Huntley as Ben
- Dominique McElligott as Emily
- Skye Bennett as Sarah
- Mr Lordi as Lead Monster
- Amen as Monster
- Kita as Monster
- Awa as Monster
- OX as Monster

== Production ==
=== Budget ===
The full budget of Dark Floors reached $4.3 million (U.S.), making it one of the most expensive films made in Finland. Most of the budget was spent on special effects design, set construction, and a large marketing campaign, along with the post-production process.

=== Scenery and special effects ===
The sets were the largest constructed in Finland, taking up 1,700 square metres during the basement carpark scene. It was originally planned to shoot the film on location in the Baltics, but Oulu was chosen instead, with special effects used to replicate a city when necessary. The production team visited hospitals to research the workings of an X-ray, thereby adding both credibility and authenticity to the CGI-rendered X-rays shown. When principal photography was completed, the extended post-production phase was launched, including the insertion of Awa's ghostly appearance.

== Release ==
=== Marketing ===
The film was originally intended to premiere in 2007, at the Eurovision song contest in Helsinki, whose opening number, featuring Lordi, with a performance of "Hard Rock Hallelujah". Unfortunately, the team could not finish their tasks in time; moreover, Lordi were already putting final touches on their Bringing Back the Balls to Europe tour. Post-production was therefore expanded into May of the same year, and was eventually rescheduled to December.

The press conference was held at the Cannes Film Festival the weekend of 19 and 20 May 2007. Lordi appeared personally, as did director Pete Riski, producer Markus Selin, and virtually all the leading actors. All involved responded to questions, and shared unusual anecdotes on making the film.

Dark Floors was slowly 'leaked' by way of a marketing campaign, and the press were permitted to witness the production of Kita's lift scene, although everything else was kept under wraps.

=== Home media ===
The film was released in the United Kingdom on DVD (region 2) by Metrodome Distribution on 20 April 2009. The release includes several extra features, listed as "Behind the Scenes of Dark Floors", "Cast & Crew Interviews", and "Dark Floors World Premiere featurette including Q&A with Lordi, the cast and crew and a live Lordi performance". The film is rated 18+ by the BBFC for "strong bloody violence and horror".

== Reception ==
Derek Elley of Variety called it "a cultural oddity with an OK concept" that will perform well on video. Bloody Disgusting rated it 3/5 stars, and wrote, "Even though it's plastered in heavy clichés and predictable plot-twists, has no sense of mood or tempo, and features some of the least scary monsters ever to grace the silver screen, it's still remarkably entertaining." Joshua Siebalt of Dread Central rated it 2.5/5 stars and called it a boring, uninspired film that is "not nearly as fun or cool as it should've been". Todd Brown of Twitch Film called it "a tightly plotted, exceptionally well shot thrill ride". Ian Jane of DVD Talk rated it 1.5/5 stars and wrote that the film does not exploit its visuals or interesting premise. David Johnson of DVD Verdict wrote, "Straight out of Finland—ghosts, demons, autism, and heavy metal combine for one of the more interesting and out-there haunted hospital movies to come around in quite some time."
