= Who's Your Daddy? (Lordi song) =

Single by Lordi

from the album The Arockalypse
- Released: 2006
- Genre: Heavy metal, hard rock
- Label: Sony BMG
- Songwriter(s): Miss Awa, Mr. Amen, Mr. Kalma, Mr Kita, Mr Lordi
- Producer(s): Jyrki Tuovinen

Lordi singles chronology
"Hard Rock Hallelujah" (2006)	"Who's Your Daddy?" (2006)	"It Snows in Hell" (2006)

"Who's Your Daddy?" is a song by the Finnish rock band Lordi. It was released in 2006, as part of the album The Arockalypse, the same album as their Eurovision Song Contest-winning song "Hard Rock Hallelujah".

== Music video ==
The video begins in an old fashioned, abandoned roller disco. A college boy and his date begin to roller blade. However, the girl pushes him onto the stage and takes her top off revealing a silvery bra. As the boy leans in to kiss her she disappears and the band appears. Mr Lordi resurrects 12 vampire girls all dressed in the same outfit as the girl in the start. The vampires begin to dance in front of Lordi, hoisting Amen above their heads as he plays. The vampires eventually swarm the boy on Mr Lordi's signal at the end of the song.

== Track listings ==
Finnish edition:

1. "Who's Your Daddy? (Decapitated Radio Edit)"
2. Whos Your Daddy? (Neutered Version)"
3. "Devil Is a Loser (Live)"

GSA edition:

1. "Who's Your Daddy? (Decipated Radio Edit)"
2. "Devil Is a Loser (Live)"

GSA special limited edition:

1. "Who's Your Daddy? (Decipated Radio Edit)"
2. "Evilove" (previously unreleased track)
3. "They Only Come Out at Night" (album version, feat. Udo Dirkschneider)
4. "Devil Is a Loser (Live)"

== Chart ==
"Who's Your Daddy?" peaked in the Finnish single chart at #1 on September 9, 2006 but quickly fell out of the Top 20. It hit #14 in Sweden on August 22, 2006 and #21 in Austria on August 23, 2006. It reached #33 in Germany on August 26, 2006.
