= Bite It Like a Bulldog =

Single by Lordi

from the album Deadache
- Released: 3 September 2008
- Recorded: May–June 2008
- Genre: Hard rock, heavy metal
- Length: 3:28
- Label: Sony BMG
- Songwriters: Mr Lordi, OX
- Producer: Nino Laurenne

Lordi singles chronology
"Beast Loose in Paradise" (2008)	"Bite It Like a Bulldog" (2008)	"Deadache" (2008)

Special edition cover

"Bite It Like a Bulldog" is a single from the Finnish rock band Lordi. It is the first single from the fourth studio album Deadache and was released digitally on 1 September 2008 and physically two days later. The song rose to number one in the Finnish charts.

== Music video ==
A music video was made for the song and released on 3 October 2008. Limppu Lindberg, who has worked with Lordi as a graphic designer, directed the video. Lead vocalist Mr Lordi said that the aim of the video was to move away from previous videos by Lordi, and showcase the band's new, more 'grotesque' look. He also said it features a more complex storyline than previous Lordi videos.

While the storyline to the video is far more obscure than that of the previous videos, it appears to revolve around a police detective searching a slaughterhouse for evidence, presumably due to something Lordi has done. As a result, Lordi tortures him with a painful sound emitted from a record, and a television screen showing numerous home videos invaded by the monsters, attacking. The detective finds Lordi, in pure fear and shock, and Lordi leans over him. Awa is holding a video camera, and the video ends with a shot of it.

== Track listing ==
1. "Bite It Like a Bulldog" (3:28)

== Special edition ==
The special edition version of the single was given away for free at a signing session which was held at Sello Shopping Centre in Espoo, Finland to celebrate the 550th anniversary of the City of Espoo. Kita, Awa and OX were also there to sign the CD and other things for fans.

The cover of the single features a picture of OX drawn by Mr. Lordi.

== Late Night with Conan O'Brien ==
Lordi performed "Bite It Like a Bulldog" on the NBC show Late Night with Conan O'Brien on 6 November 2008.

== Chart performance ==
Country	Position
Finland	1

== Certifications ==
Region	Certification	Certified units/sales
Finland (Musiikkituottajat)	Gold	6,327
