= It Snows in Hell =

Single by Lordi

from the album The Arockalypse
- Released: 5 December 2006
- Genre: Hard rock, heavy metal
- Label: Sony BMG
- Songwriter(s): Tracy Lipp, Awa, Amen, Kalma, Kita, Mr Lordi
- Producer(s): Jyrki Tuovinen

Lordi singles chronology
| "Who's Your Daddy?" (2006) | "It Snows in Hell" (2006) | "They Only Come Out at Night" (2007) |

"It Snows in Hell" is a song from the Finnish rock band Lordi's album The Arockalypse. The single was released in a standard jewel case and in a digipack by the Finnish Posti-company. For the single release, Lordi produced a new version which contains softer vocals which would ultimately replace the original on the special edition of The Arockalypse. The song charted at number 2 in Finland.

== Track listing ==
1. "It Snows in Hell"
2. "Evilove"

== Music video ==
Even though Bruce Kulick did the guitar solo, he didn't star in the music video. The video was sponsored by the Finnish Posti-company. It begins with a young woman writing a letter to Mr Lordi, begging him to save her as men in hoods (likely witch-hunters) break into her house. The girl escapes through the window just before they seize her. She runs barefoot into the forest to a statue, likely the gravesite of Mr Lordi, as referenced in the song. The witch-hunters catch up to her and rip the letter for help from her hand, letting it scatter into the wind. They drag her away to burn her at the stake. At this point, the clips of the band playing in a snowy forest interlace with the story of the girl as the pages of the letter flutter to Mr Lordi. The letter catches Mr Lordi's attention. The girl is bound to the stake and just as the head witch-hunter is about to light the fire, a shadow looms over the other hunters. All are frightened away except the head witch-hunter. He turns to find Mr Lordi behind him, who makes the terrified man vanish as steam rises from the man's cloak in a heap on the ground. Mr Lordi and the girl exchange glances, and as the lyrics in the song go; this hints that they have some kind of relation to one another and that he will see her again in hell. The ropes around her vanish and the girl finds herself in a cheerful meadow smiling as the video ends.

== DVD release ==
The Finnish Posti-company released the music video in a DVD format featuring the song only.
