= Would You Love a Monsterman? =

Single by Lordi

from the album Get Heavy
- Released: 2002
- Recorded: June–July 2002
- Genre: Hard rock
- Length: 3:02
- Label: Sony BMG
- Songwriter(s): Sampsa Astala, Tomi Petteri Putaansuu, Erna Siikavirta, Jussi Antero Sydänmaa, Sami Wolking
- Producer(s): T.T. Oksala

Lordi singles chronology
"Would You Love a Monsterman?" (2002)	"Devil Is a Loser" (2003)

German edition cover

2006 edition cover

"Would You Love a Monsterman?" is a song by the Finnish rock band Lordi from their album Get Heavy. It was also released as a single. The song reached number one on the Finnish charts in 2002.

"Would You Love a Monsterman?" was originally written as "I Would Do It All For You" when Mr Lordi wrote and recorded it for the first demo album in 1993.

In 2006, the song was re-recorded with keyboardist Awa and bassist OX. This version was released as a limited-print promotional single, as well as a bonus track on the special edition of the 2006 album The Arockalypse.

== Music video ==
There are two music videos for the song. The first one involves a young girl playing with a very dirty doll in a strange woodland. After several seconds the band appears and starts to play the song. As the lead vocalist Mr Lordi sings, it seems that he is trying to convince her to join him and his band. She eventually approaches him and gives him her doll and he sets it alight, showing her the truth of his monstrous nature.

Towards the end of the song, she seems to consent to joining them and grins manically.

In the 2006 version, the band are cadavers which appear in a morgue. While listening to the radio (in which the DJ announces the song about to be played), an assisting woman notices one of the band members and they make their appearance, killing the two men trying to investigate the bodies. The band then approaches her and the rest of the video goes very much the same way as the first (minus, of course, the woodland and the doll).

== Track listings ==
Finnish version:

1. "Would You Love a Monsterman?" (single version)
2. "Biomechanic Man"
3. "Would You Love a Monsterman?" (radio edit)

German version:

1. "Would You Love a Monsterman?" (single version)
2. "Biomechanic Man" (album version)
3. "Would You Love a Monsterman?" (radio edit)

2006 version:

1. "Would You Love a Monsterman? (2006)"

== Charts ==
Chart (2002)	Peak position
Finland	1
Sweden	54

== Certifications ==
Region	Certification	Certified units/sales
Finland (Musiikkituottajat)	Gold	8,319
