= Pete Riski =

Finnish director

- Born: 9 January 1974 (age 51); Rovaniemi, Finland
- Occupation: Director
- Website: peteriski.com

Pete Riski (born 9 January 1974) is a Finnish music video director. He has directed music videos for hard rock band Lordi, among others, and directed the 2008 horror film Dark Floors.

== Biography ==
Riski was born in Rovaniemi and studied from 1992 to 1996 on Tornio College of Arts and Media in Kemi. He is currently a freelance director. He has worked for the following companies: Rattling Stick from UK, Sons and Daughters from Canada and the Helsinki-based Directors Guild.

== Filmography ==
=== Music videos ===
- Nylon Beat – Viimeinen
- Nylon Beat – Seksi vie ja taksi tuo
- Nylon Beat – Syytön
- Come Inside – Hold Me Now
- Z-MC: The Drum & the Bass
- Waldo's People – U Drive Me Crazy
- Waldo's People – 1000 Ways
- Jonna Tervomaa – Yhtä en saa
- Egotrippi – Koivuniemen herra
- Paleface – The Ultimate Jedi Mind Trick – Episode IV
- Lordi – Would You Love a Monsterman?
- Lordi – Devil Is a Loser
- Lordi – Blood Red Sandman
- Lordi – Hard Rock Hallelujah
- Lordi – It Snows in Hell
- Lordi – Who's Your Daddy?
- Husky Rescue – New Light of Tomorrow
- Husky Rescue – Caravan
- Husky Rescue – They Are Coming
- Negative – End of the Line

=== Movies ===
- 1997: Samuli Edelmann: Huilunsoittaja (short film)
- 2008: Dark Floors

=== Television ===
- 2018: Bullets
