= Vinilkosmo =

French independent record label

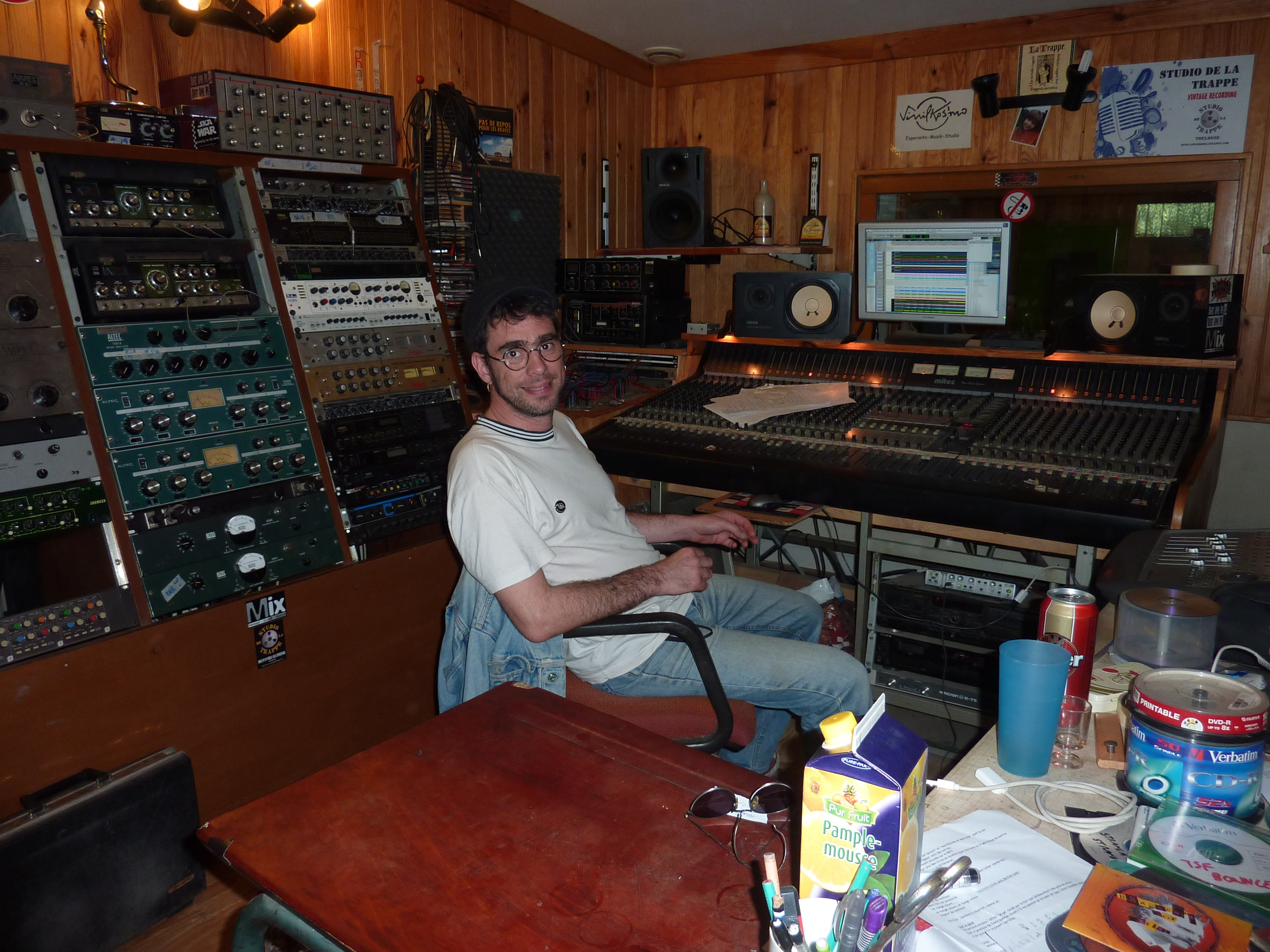
Studio at Vinilkosmo

Vinilkosmo is an independent record label in Donneville, near Toulouse, France. It only produces and distributes artists who sing in Esperanto.

== History ==
Vinilkosmo was created in 1990 by Floréal Martorell in the framework of the Esperanto music association EUROKKA. In January 1999, Vinilkosmo separated from EUROKKA, and went professional. Since July 2009, Vinilkosmo has offered a legal download platform for most of the released albums on its website, Vinilkosmo-MP3.

== Project Kolekto 2000 ==
Vinilkosmo became famous in the Esperanto public with its project Kolekto 2000. It produced ten original high-quality albums in its own recording studio from 1998 to 2000:

- JoMo kaj Liberecanoj
- Ĵak Yvart: Jacques Yvart kantas Georges Brassens
- Persone: ...sed estas ne
- Solotronik: Plimorfia Arkiteknia
- Merlin: Por La Mondo
- La Porkoj: Ŝako
- Kajto: Masko
- La Kompanoj: Survoje
- Kore: Kia viv'
- Dolchamar: Lingvo Intermonda

Since then, the label has released numerous compilations and original productions, becoming one of the major actors in Esperanto culture.

== Artists ==
Since its creation, Vinilkosmo has produced and/or distributed the following artists and groups:

- Akordo
- Alejandro Cossavella
- Amindaj
- Amplifiki
- baRok'
- Morice Benin
- Mikaelo Bronŝtejn
- Cantica
- Carina
- Alberta Casey
- Diablo
- DĴ Kunar
- DĴ Rogxer
- Dolchamar
- Duoble unu
- Esperanto Desperado
- Espo Despo
- Eterne Rima
- Thierry Faverial
- Flávio Fonseca
- Ralph Glomp
- inicialoj dc
- Jonny M
- Jean-Marc Leclercq (JoMo)
- Vera Jordan
- Ĵomart et Nataŝa
- Kaj Tiel Plu
- Kajto
- Kapriol'
- Keĉka
- La Kompanoj
- Konga Espero
- Kore
- Krio de Morto
- Tarcísio Lima
- Lunatiko
- Magnus
- Martin kaj la talpoj
- Mayoma
- Merlin
- Meven
- La Mevo
- Nikolin'
- La Pafklik
- Patric
- Marcus Pengel
- La Perdita Generacio
- Persone
- Platano
- La Porkoj
- Miĥail Povorin
- Elena Puhova
- Ĵak Le Puil
- Rêverie
- La Rolls
- Rosemary's Babies
- Solotronik
- Kaj Stridell
- Strika Tango
- Supernova
- TEAM
- Tone
- Vigla Muziko
- Martin Wiese
- Jürgen Wulff
- Jacques Yvart
- Zhou-Mack Mafuila

== See also ==
- Esperanto music
