= Esperanto music =

Music in a constructed language

A music video for the Esperanto song "La fina venk'" from the 2012 album Signoj de viv' by inicialoj dc (a music project of Éric Languillat)

A recording of the Esperanto song "Mankas vi" from the 2015 album Nenifar' by Guillaume Armide

A number of musical works are available in the Esperanto language. The phrase "Esperanto music" is sometimes used to include music which is about Esperanto.

== Classical music ==
- Lou Harrison, who incorporated styles and instruments from many world cultures in his music, used Esperanto titles and/or texts in several of his works, most notably La Koro-Sutro (1973).
- David Gaines used Esperanto texts for his Symphony No. 1 (Esperanto) for mezzo-soprano and orchestra (1994–98) and Povas plori mi ne plu (I Can Cry No Longer) for unaccompanied SATB choir (1994).
- Louisa Frederica Adela Schafer (born 1865) translated English hymns in Esperanto and wrote the Esperanto song "Antauen!"
- Montagu C. Butler
- The opera Sternenhoch by Ivan Acher is sung in Esperanto.

== Musicians, singers and bands ==
- Dolchamar
- Jean-Marc Leclercq (JoMo)
- Jonny M, a reggae and rap music singer-songwriter
- Kim J. Henriksen
- Kajto
- Merlin
- Martin & La Talpoj
- Persone

== Songs ==
- "La Espero"

== Music companies and publishers ==
- ESP-Disk
- Vinilkosmo
- Floréal Martorell
- Brazila-Esperanto-Ligo
- Edistudio
- Nigra Kato
- Rusa Esperantista Unio

== Events and projects ==
- Vinilkosmo kompil'
- Kolekto 2000
- Esperanto Subgrunde kompil'
- FESTO (Esperanto meeting)

== References to Esperanto in music ==
- Slovak band TEAM released an entire album in Esperanto.
- "The Crystal Theme" from the opening of Final Fantasy XI was sung in Esperanto ("Memoro de la Ŝtono").
- Kurt Elling wrote a vocalese song called "Esperanto" based on the Vince Mendoza composition "Esperança". Elling explains on his album Live in Chicago (Blue Note) that the lyrics were written while he was under the impression that it was titled "Esperanto" and only later found out the original title, which is the Portuguese word for 'hope'.
- The second album of former German hip hop crew Freundeskreis was titled "Esperanto". The same-called lead track was also released as a single.
- A Russian band Tesla Coil released an album GV in 2014. Lyrics are partially in Esperanto. There is also a song which has a name in Esperanto - "Kirasa Kerno" (Armored Core).

== See also ==
- Music Portal
