= Hard Rock Hallelujah =

2006 song by Lordi

Single by Lordi

from the album The Arockalypse
- B-side: "Mr. Killjoy"
- Released: 22 February 2006
- Genre: Heavy metal, hard rock
- Length: 4:09 (album version); 3:01 (radio edit)
- Label: RCA; Sony BMG
- Songwriters: Miss Awa; Mr. Amen; Mr. Kalma; Mr Kita; Mr Lordi
- Producer: Jyrki Tuovinen

Lordi singles chronology
"Blood Red Sandman" (2004)	"Hard Rock Hallelujah" (2006)	"Who's Your Daddy?" (2006)

Music video
- "Hard Rock Hallelujah" on YouTube

Eurovision Song Contest 2006 entry
- Country: Finland
- Artist: Lordi
- Language: English
- Composer: Mr Lordi
- Lyricist: Mr Lordi

Finals performance
- Semi-final result: 1st
- Semi-final points: 292
- Final result: 1st
- Final points: 292

Entry chronology
- ◄ "Why?" (2005)
- "Leave Me Alone" (2007) ►

Official performance video
- "Hard Rock Hallelujah" (Final) on YouTube

"Hard Rock Hallelujah" is a song by the Finnish rock band Lordi. It represented Finland in the Eurovision Song Contest 2006, held in Athens, resulting in the country's only ever victory in the contest. It reached the No. 1 spot in Finland and reached the top 10 in eight other European countries. In the United Kingdom, the song peaked at No. 25.

== Background ==
=== Selection ===
Between 13 January–10 March 2006, "Hard Rock Hallelujah" performed by Lordi competed in Euroviisut 2006, the national final organised by Yleisradio (Yle) to select its song and performer for the 51st edition of the Eurovision Song Contest. The song won the national competition, becoming the Finnish entry –and Lordi the performers– for Eurovision.

=== Eurovision ===
On 18 May 2006, the Eurovision Song Contest semi-final was held at the Nikos Galis Olympic Indoor Hall in Athens, hosted by the Hellenic Broadcasting Corporation (ERT) and broadcast live throughout the continent. As Finland had not finished in the top 10 at the previous contest, the song had to compete in the semi-finals. Lordi performed "Hard Rock Hallelujah" sixteenth on the evening and received 292 points, placing first in a field of 23 and qualifying for the final.

On 20 May 2006, in the grand final for the Eurovision Song Contest, Lordi performed "Hard Rock Hallelujah" seventeenth on the evening.

Having led the voting for most of the telecast, it ultimately received 292 points again, winning the competition, breaking the previous record – held by "Wild Dances" by Ruslana – for the highest points tally in contest history as well as achieving the unusual feat of exactly emulating its semi-final points tally. It was the country's first win and was voted as the most popular Finnish Eurovision entry in the forty years the country had participated. It held the record for most points until it was beaten by "Fairytale" by Alexander Rybak for Norway with 387 points three years later. It was the second Eurovision song with the word "hallelujah" in its title, the first one being Israel's "Hallelujah", which also got first place at the Eurovision Song Contest 1979.

==== Performance ====
The semifinal and final performances of "Hard Rock Hallelujah" at Eurovision were similar; the lead singer, Mr Lordi, stated before the final that the only planned changes were that "We'll scream louder. And turn the amps up." The performance took place on a fairly bare stage, with banks of video monitors in the back displaying abstract images of fire, and the band in their usual monster costumes.

The band brought a hat including the flag of Finland to the performance, worn by Mr Lordi in the actual performance and by Amen during the encore after the winning. For the final performances Mr Lordi also used two official stage props from Lordi's live concerts: a two-headed battle axe and bat-like wings. During the whole performance, the band members remained relatively stationary, with the exception of guitarist Amen, who hopped back and forth energetically.

The song had frequent use of pyrotechnics, starting with flames bursting from the stage during the song's introduction, and bursts of sparks, particularly during the chorus. The final chorus of the song had an extended pyrotechnic display, with the whole stage covered in sparks, including jets shooting from the ends of Amen's guitar and Ox's bass as they were being played, and from the two-headed axe that Mr Lordi held up above his head. The encore performance after they were announced the winners was much simpler, as the pyrotechnics were obviously not available and Mr Lordi's wings did not unfurl.

=== Aftermath ===
On 26 May 2006, Lordi broke the Guinness World Record of karaoke singing when approximately 80,000 people gathered to sing "Hard Rock Hallelujah" in Helsinki's Market Square, to celebrate their victory in Eurovision.

As the winning broadcaster, the European Broadcasting Union (EBU) gave Yle the responsibility to host the following edition of the Eurovision Song Contest. The grand final held on 12 May 2007, opened with a filmed sequence from "Arctic Circle, Finland, Rovaniemi" in which the band began to sing "Hard Rock Hallelujah", cutting to the band performing on the Eurovision stage mid-song. They also presented the trophy to the winner.

On 31 March 2015, Lordi performed the song in the Eurovision sixtieth anniversary show Eurovision Song Contest's Greatest Hits held in London. On 22 May 2021, the interval act "Rock the Roof" in the Eurovision Song Contest 2021 grand final features "Hard Rock Hallelujah" performed by Lordi.

== Music videos ==
=== Promo video ===
Directed by Pete Riski, the video starts with a shy female hard rock fan (Leina Ogihara) walking through the corridors of a school, singing softly along to the song playing on her headset. She reaches an entrance to the gym, where she stands watching the cheerleaders practice. Suddenly, the lights flicker and go out, and a wind starts to blow. As the chorus starts to play, the doors to the gym are blown off of their hinges by Mr Lordi, who enters and crushes the now-screaming cheerleaders with a wave of his hands killing them. There is a fiery flash, and the entire band appears in the centre of the gym, playing the song.

The fan is terrified, but approaches Mr Lordi as he points to her, singing "... you will see the jokers soon'll be the new kings". He raises the dead cheerleaders as zombies, and they stand around the fan pumping their fists in the air along with the music. The end of the video shows the fan, now confident and unafraid, leading the zombies through the school halls as students run away. She stops and punches the air with her fist as the zombies rush around her towards a group of students who are trapped by the closed main doors.

=== Eurovision 2007 ===
Another video was filmed specially for the Eurovision Song Contest 2007 grand final opening, directed by Antti J. Jokinen. Video starts with titles: "Arctic Circle, Finland, Rovaniemi". A troll runs through the Arctic landscape obviously showing signs of a bad limp in one of his legs. As the Troll reaches a frozen lake, it suddenly shatters in a straight line behind him and as vast chunks of ice fall around him the troll changes into a wolf to pick up speed and escape death. Meanwhile, Mr Lordi and the band play in a hut at the deep dark forest and then they set the woods on fire with the flame forming lines that become Lordi's symbol—the monster mask. The Troll changes back to his previous form once he reaches the entrance of the dark forest as night begins to fall. The troll is next seen arriving at a small village filled with orcish creatures in the dead night and as he walks down a path leading out of the village, the troll comes across a huge hut made from a tree. Entering the hut the Troll comes face to face with Mr Lordi who seems to be the chief of the other creatures and as the band continues to play a whirlwind of flames surround them all. Mr Lordi then unleashes his demonic wings and seemingly burns the troll by manipulating the flames, As the fire fades away Mr Lordi and the rest of band are seen at a concert in Finland surrounded by their fans who sing the final chorus of the song along with them.

== Track listings ==
Finnish CD single

1. "Hard Rock Hallelujah" (Eurovicious radio edit) – 3:01
2. "Hard Rock Hallelujah" (full album version) – 4:07
3. "Mr. Killjoy" – 3:24

European CD single

1. "Hard Rock Hallelujah" (Eurovicious radio edit) – 3:01
2. "Mr. Killjoy" – 3:24

German CD single

1. "Hard Rock Hallelujah" (Eurovicious radio edit) – 3:01
2. "Supermonstars" (album version) – 4:04

German DualDisc CD single

CD side

1. "Hard Rock Hallelujah" (Eurovicious radio edit)
2. "Hard Rock Hallelujah" (full album version)
3. "Mr. Killjoy"

DVD side

1. "Hard Rock Hallelujah" (video)
2. "Blood Red Sandman" (video)
3. "Devil Is a Loser" (video)

== Commercial performance ==
The song peaked at No. 1 in the Finland singles chart upon its release and in addition, released as a physical single during the week starting on 5 June 2006 in the United Kingdom, via the BMG label. Download sales for the previous week were therefore eligible to be counted for the 4 June 2006 UK Singles Chart, which led to the single to chart at No. 59. It made a small but significant impact in the Top 40, peaking at No. 25 in the 11 June 2006 chart as the band's only single so far to ever be released in that country.

=== Weekly charts ===
Chart (2006)	Peak position
Austria (Ö3 Austria Top 40)	2
Belgium (Ultratop 50 Flanders)	2
Belgium (Ultratop 50 Wallonia)	21
Europe (Eurochart Hot 100)	7
Finland (Suomen virallinen lista)	1
Germany (GfK)	5
Greece (IFPI)	6
Ireland (IRMA)	4
Netherlands (Single Top 100)	27
Norway (VG-lista)	9
Scottish Singles Sales (Official Charts)	12
Sweden (Sverigetopplistan)	8
Switzerland (Schweizer Hitparade)	5
Turkey (Turkish Singles Chart)	14
UK Singles (Official Charts)	25
UK Rock & Metal (Official Charts)	1

=== Year-end charts ===
Chart (2006)	Position
Austria (Ö3 Austria Top 40)	15
Belgium (Ultratop 50 Flanders)	12
Germany (Media Control GfK)	27
Sweden (Hitlistan)	56
Switzerland (Schweizer Hitparade)	47

=== Certifications ===
Region	Certification	Certified units/sales
Germany (BVMI)	Gold	150,000^{^}
^{^} Shipments figures based on certification alone.

Preceded by "My Number One" by Helena Paparizou	Eurovision Song Contest winners 2006	Succeeded by "Molitva" by Marija Šerifović
