= Babez for Breakfast =

Studio album by Lordi
- Released: 10 September 2010 (Germany); 13 September 2010 (iTunes); 14 September 2010 (United States); 15 September 2010 (Estonia); 15 September 2010 (Finland); 27 September 2010 (Poland); 27 October 2010 (Japan)
- Recorded: 16 February – 14 April 2010
- Studios: WireWorld (Nashville, Tennessee)
- Genres: Hard rock; heavy metal; glam metal; shock rock
- Length: 48:33
- Labels: Sony Music; The End (Canada, United States)
- Producer: Michael Wagener

Lordi chronology
Deadache (2008)	Babez for Breakfast (2010)	To Beast or Not to Beast (2013)

Singles from Babez for Breakfast
- 1. "This Is Heavy Metal" Released: 9 August 2010

Professional ratings
Review scores
Source	Rating
Allmusic	link
Time for Metal (Germany)	link

Babez for Breakfast is the fifth studio album by the Finnish rock band Lordi, released on 10 September 2010. As is traditional for the band, their costumes were renewed for the release of this album. The album was produced by Michael Wagener. It was the final album to feature both Kita and Awa before their departure from the band.

The first single, "This Is Heavy Metal", was released digitally on 9 August 2010, and physically a week later on 16 August. There were only an estimated 200 physical copies of the single made and it is seen as a rare collector's item amongst Lordi fans.

A limited edition of the album, entitled The Breakfast Box includes bonus merchandise and was released on 18 October 2010.

== Recording ==
The recording of the album started on 16 February 2010 at WireWorld Studio in Nashville, Tennessee, United States. The band had 44 demos to choose from, of which 15 made the final cut.

== Track list ==
No.	Title	Lyrics	Music	Length
1.	"SCG5: It's a Boy!"	Mr Lordi	Mr Lordi	1:21
2.	"Babez for Breakfast"	Mr Lordi, Tracy Lipp	Mr Lordi	3:30
3.	"This Is Heavy Metal"	Mr Lordi, Lipp	Mr Lordi	3:01
4.	"Rock Police"	Mr Lordi, Lipp	Mr Lordi, P.K. Hell	3:58
5.	"Discoevil"	Mr Lordi, Lipp	Mr Lordi	3:49
6.	"Call Off the Wedding"	Mr Lordi	Mr Lordi, Bruce Kulick, Jeremy Rubolino	3:31
7.	"I Am Bigger Than You"	Mr Lordi, Lipp	Mr Lordi	3:04
8.	"ZombieRawkMachine"	Mr Lordi	Mr Lordi, Amen	3:42
9.	"Midnite Lover"	Mr Lordi, Lipp	Mr Lordi, Amen	3:21
10.	"Give Your Life for Rock and Roll"	Mr Lordi, Lipp	Mr Lordi, Awa, Ox, Cosimo Binetti	3:54
11.	"Nonstop Nite"	Mr Lordi, Lipp	Mr Lordi, Amen, P.K. Hell	3:56
12.	"Amen's Lament to Ra"		Amen	0:32
13.	"Loud and Loaded"	Mr Lordi, Lipp	Mr Lordi	3:15
14.	"Granny's Gone Crazy"	Mr Lordi	Mr Lordi, Ox	3:56
15.	"Devil's Lullaby"	Mr Lordi, Lipp	Mr Lordi	3:43
Total length:				48:33

iTunes version
No.	Title	Length
16.	"Lord Have Mercy"	3:18
Total length:		51:51

Japanese version
No.	Title	Length
16.	"Lord Have Mercy"	3:18
17.	"Studs 'n' Leather"	3:58
Total length:		55:49

== Personnel ==
Lordi

- Mr Lordi – vocals, artwork, art direction, layout
- Amen – guitars, backing vocals
- Kita – drums, backing vocals
- OX – bass
- Awa – keyboards

Additional musicians

- Bruce Kulick – guitars (6)
- Mark Slaughter – vocals (14)
- Julie Westlake – vocals (10)
- Ainsley Billings – vocals (14)
- Gracyn Billings – vocals (14)
- Clay Vann – voice (4), backing vocals
- Goldy Locks – voice (1)
- Ralph Ruiz – voice (1)
- Tracy Lipp – voice (1, 10), backing vocals
- Marija S. – vocals (10)
- Sarge – backing vocals
- Bryan Blumer – backing vocals
- Jeremy Rubolino – string arrangements (6)

Production

- Michael Wagener – production, recording, mixing
- Eric Conn – mastering
- Don Cobb – mastering
- Petri Haggrén – photography

== Charts ==
Chart (2010)	Peak position
Austria	71
France	113
Finland	9
Germany	66
Greece	26
