= The Monsterican Dream =

Studio album by Lordi
- Released: 14 April 2004 (Finland); 1 June 2004 (Germany)
- Recorded: 2003–2004 at Finnvox
- Genre: Hard rock; heavy metal; shock rock
- Length: 46:10
- Label: BMG Finland, Drakkar
- Producer: Hiili Hiilesmaa

Lordi chronology
Get Heavy (2002)	The Monsterican Dream (2004)	The Arockalypse (2006)

The Monsterican Dream is the second studio album by the Finnish rock band Lordi, released in 2004.

The album was re-released in Finland as a "Limited Edition" on DVD, which included Lordi's short film The Kin.

== Track listing ==
No.	Title	Lyrics	Music	Length
1.	"Threatical Trailer"	Mr Lordi	Mr Lordi & Kita	1:09
2.	"Bring It On (The Raging Hounds Return)"	Mr Lordi	Mr Lordi	4:35
3.	"Blood Red Sandman"	Mr Lordi	Mr Lordi	4:03
4.	"My Heaven Is Your Hell"	Mr Lordi	Mr Lordi	3:41
5.	"Pet the Destroyer"	Mr Lordi & Kita	Kita	3:50
6.	"The Children of the Night"	Mr Lordi	Mr Lordi	3:44
7.	"Wake the Snake"	Mr Lordi	Mr Lordi	3:46
8.	"Shotgun Divorce"	Mr Lordi	Mr Lordi	4:42
9.	"Forsaken Fashion Dolls"	Mr Lordi & Amen	Mr Lordi & Amen	3:43
10.	"Haunted Town"	Mr Lordi & Kita	Kita	3:13
11.	"Fire in the Hole"	Mr Lordi	Mr Lordi	3:27
12.	"Magistra Nocte"		Enary	1:33
13.	"Kalmageddon"	Mr Lordi & Kalma	Mr Lordi, Kalma & P.K. Hell	4:33

=== Limited edition bonus DVD ===
- The Kin Movie
  - Making of The Kin
  - Storyboard
  - Photo Gallery

== Singles ==
- "My Heaven Is Your Hell"
- "Blood Red Sandman"

== Personnel ==
Credits for The Monsterican Dream adapted from liner notes.

Lordi

- Mr Lordi – vocals, programming, cover art, artwork, layout
- Amen – guitars, backing vocals
- Kita – drums, backing vocals, engineering
- Kalma – bass, backing vocals, engineering
- Enary – keyboards, piano, backing vocals

Production

- Hiili Hiilesmaa – production, engineering, mixing, programming
- Mika Jussila – mastering
- Juha Heininen – engineering
- Tracy Lipp – engineering
- Petri Haggrén – photography

== Charts ==
Chart (2004)	Peak position
Finland	4
Germany	70

== Certifications ==
Region	Certification	Certified units/sales
Finland (Musiikkituottajat)	Platinum	33,102
