= Devil Is a Loser =

Single by Lordi

from the album Get Heavy
- Released: 2003
- Recorded: June–July 2002
- Genre: Hard rock, heavy metal
- Length: 3:29
- Label: Sony BMG
- Songwriter(s): Tomi Petteri Putaansuu
- Producer(s): T.T. Oksala

Lordi singles chronology
"Would You Love a Monsterman?" (2002)	"Devil Is a Loser" (2003)	"My Heaven Is Your Hell" (2004)

"Devil is a Loser" is the second single by the Finnish rock band Lordi. It is one of six songs that have been made into music videos by the band. It was originally released in 2002, as part of the album entitled Get Heavy.

== Track list ==
1. "Devil Is a Loser" (3:29)
2. "Don't Let My Mother Know" (3:32)
3. "Devil Is a Loser" (music video)

== Non-Satanic song ==
Lordi, who are frequently referred to as a Satanic band, often point to this song – which refers to the Devil as the singer's "bitch" – as evidence contrary to that assertion. As the songwriter and composer Tomi Putaansuu (Mr. Lordi) puts it, "We have many fans who are believers. Devil Is a Loser opened the gates in that perspective. It has such a statement that fans in faith realised that these guys are on our side." However, some still think that the band has Satanic, or at least demonic, influences as this song implies that Mr. Lordi is worse than the Devil.

"Devil Is a Loser" was one of six songs performed in the 26 May 2006 open-air concert in Helsinki, where the band celebrated their Eurovision victory, the first for any Finnish band, where the song "Hard Rock Hallelujah" won them a record 292 points.

== Music video ==
The music video for the song takes place in a rave called the 'Halloween BloodBathParty' where the track that is currently playing (the beginning of the song) explodes and comes to a startling halt. The crowd mills around for a few seconds before the song starts back up. Mr. Lordi rises up from behind the DJ and drags him into another room. The last image of the DJ is seen through a small window in a doorway.

Amen and Kalma are then seen arriving to the rave; the crowd grow frightened as the rest of the band appears silhouetted behind a ragged plastic curtain. A young man with plastic devil horns looks through a hole in the curtain but backs away when Mr. Lordi swipes at him. Next a girl in a white T-shirt walks up to the curtain to look through, but this time, Mr. Lordi grasps her head, possibly possessing her. She then drifts back through the crowd with blank, white eyes and an insane smile repeating a verse of the song. The curtain then falls as the speakers explode and catch fire.

The crowd runs, terrified, up to a chain linked fence and try to escape but to no avail, as Mr. Lordi appears behind them and they all vanish.
