= The Arockalypse =

Studio album by Lordi
- Released: 3 March 2006
- Genre: Hard rock; heavy metal; shock rock
- Length: 44:57
- Label: Sony BMG, Drakkar, The End
- Producer: Jyrki Tuovinen

Lordi chronology
The Monsterican Dream (2004)	The Arockalypse (2006)	Deadache (2008)

Singles from The Arockalypse
- 1. "Hard Rock Hallelujah" Released: 22 February 2006; 2. "Who's Your Daddy?" Released: 30 August 2006; 3. "Would You Love a Monsterman 2006" Released: 2006; 4. "It Snows in Hell" Released: 5 December 2006; 5. "They Only Come Out at Night" Released: 2 May 2007

Professional ratings
Review scores
Source	Rating
AllMusic	link
Rolling Stone	link at the Wayback Machine (archived 28 March 2009)

The Arockalypse is the third studio album by the Finnish rock band Lordi. It includes the hit single "Hard Rock Hallelujah", which won the Eurovision Song Contest 2006 for Finland. The album has sold triple platinum in Finland and gold in Sweden. Although the album cover shows OX, it was Kalma who played bass guitar on the album.

== Guests ==
The Arockalypse has many guest-stars on its tracks: Dee Snider and Jay Jay French from Twisted Sister, Udo Dirkschneider from Accept/U.D.O. and Bruce Kulick from Kiss. Before the album was released in Finland, there were rumours about other possible guest stars, including Sebastian Bach from Skid Row, Alice Cooper, King Diamond, Rob Zombie, and other members of Kiss, the latter being Lordi's greatest influence. In reality, only Sebastian Bach and Alice Cooper were ever asked to be guests on the album, but neither were able to make it.

== Track listing ==
1. "SCG3 Special Report" (with Starbuck as The News Reporter, Sam Romero and Dee Snider as "the monster squad's spokesman") – 3:46 (Mr Lordi/Kita)
2. "Bringing Back the Balls to Rock" – 3:31 (Mr Lordi)
3. "The Deadite Girls Gone Wild" – 3:45 (Mr Lordi/Kita/Tracy Lipp)
4. "The Kids Who Wanna Play with the Dead" – 4:07 (Mr Lordi)
5. "It Snows in Hell" (feat. Bruce Kulick) – 3:37 (Mr Lordi/Kita/Lipp)
6. "Who's Your Daddy?" – 3:38 (Mr Lordi)
7. "Hard Rock Hallelujah" – 4:07 (Mr Lordi)
8. "They Only Come Out at Night" (feat. Udo Dirkschneider) – 3:49 (Mr Lordi/Amen)
9. "The Chainsaw Buffet" (feat. Jay Jay French) – 3:57 (Mr Lordi)
10. "Good to Be Bad" – 3:31 (Mr Lordi)
11. "The Night of the Loving Dead" – 3:09 (Mr Lordi)
12. "Supermonstars (The Anthem of the Phantoms)" – 4:04 (Mr Lordi)

Bonus tracks

13. "Would You Love a Monsterman? (2006)"
14. "Mr. Killjoy"
15. "EviLove"

== Charts and certifications ==
=== Charts ===
Chart (2006)	Peak position
Austrian Albums (Ö3 Austria)	11
Belgium (Flanders)	13
Denmark	16
Estonia	4
Finland	1
France	98
Germany	7
Greece	1
Norway	21
Poland	29
Sweden	1
Swiss Albums (Schweizer Hitparade)	8
United Kingdom	100
European Top 100 Albums	8
US Heatseekers Albums (Billboard)	17

=== Certifications ===
Region	Certification	Certified units/sales
Finland (Musiikkituottajat)	2× Platinum	97,149
Germany (BVMI)	Gold	100,000^{‡}
Sweden (GLF)	Gold	30,000^{^}
^{^} Shipments figures based on certification alone.^{‡} Sales+streaming figures based on certification alone.

== Personnel ==
Credits for The Arockalypse adapted from liner notes.

Lordi

- Mr Lordi – vocals, cover art, layout
- Amen – guitars
- Kita – drums, backing vocals, recording, mixing
- Kalma – bass
- Awa – keyboards

Additional musicians

- Michael Majalahti – voice
- Bruce Kulick – guitars (5)
- Tracy Lipp – voice (1)
- Alexandra Alexis – voice (1)
- Dee Snider – vocals (1)
- Udo Dirkschneider – vocals (8)
- Jay Jay French – guitars (9)
- The Fire Quire of Lathe St. – backing vocals
- Nottingburroughs Boy Choir – backing vocals (7)
- The Naughty Lordi Girls Choir – backing vocals

Production

- Svante Forsbäck – mastering
- Mika Lindberg – cover art, layout
- Petri Haggrén – photography
- Jyrki Tuovinen – production, recording, mixing
