= Deadache =

Studio album by Lordi
- Released: 24 October 2008
- Recorded: 7 May – June 2008
- Studios: Sonic Pump Studios, Finnvox
- Genres: Hard rock; heavy metal; shock rock
- Length: 47:07
- Labels: Sony Music; GUN (Germany); The End (Canada, United States)
- Producer: Nino Laurenne

Lordi chronology
The Arockalypse (2006)	Deadache (2008)	Babez for Breakfast (2010)

Singles from Deadache
- 1. "Bite It Like a Bulldog" Released: 13 August 2008; 2. "Deadache" Released: 20 December 2008

Professional ratings
Review scores
Source	Rating
Allmusic	link
Rolling Stone	link
Kerrang!	3/5 stars

Deadache is the fourth studio album by the Finnish rock band Lordi, released in Finland on 29 October 2008. For the release of the album the band renewed their monster outfits. Deadache was released during the same week in about thirty countries. The official album release party was held at the Tavastia Club in Helsinki on 31 October 2008 (Hallowe'en).

The first single from the album, "Bite It Like a Bulldog", was released on 3 September 2008. By November 2008, Deadache had sold 1,700 copies in the United States.

== Recording ==
Lordi started the recording of Deadache on 7 May 2008. For the album, the group had sixty demos to choose from; fourteen of them were chosen by the band and record company to be recorded. All members of the group contributed songs to the album.

The recordings were finished in June, the group then went on tour in Europe.

== Press ==
Band members Kita and Amen said the following about the Deadache:

[Kita] "It's an old title. We had that song back in the '90s already, a song called 'Deadache', and our singer, Mr. Lordi, thought that he made that up, that whole word. Like, headache and deadache, but he heard it actually means something." [Mr. Amen] "It actually, the title, it means something. Actually we had sixty songs to choose from and we picked out fifteen songs. We didn't think any (musical) directions or anything, we just did what we have." [Kita] "Usually we don't think (laughs)" [Amen] "We do what feels good with it."

== Music ==
Deadache is a melodic hard rock album, but has a heavier sound and includes more horror-themes than Lordi's previous albums. The album has more keyboard parts than The Arockalypse, and the song "The Rebirth Of The Countess", composed by the keyboard player Awa, includes a spoken part in French. "Missing Miss Charlene" includes singing by a children's choir, with the outro being already recorded in 1986 by a 12-year-old Mr. Lordi and some of his friends from his hometown of Rovaniemi.

The organ in the intro and between the verses in the song "The Devil Hides Behind Her Smile" is taken from "The Phantom of the Opera".

== Track listing ==
No.	Title	Lyrics	Music	Length
1.	"SCG IV"	Mr Lordi	Mr Lordi	0:42
2.	"Girls Go Chopping"	Mr Lordi, Lipp	Mr Lordi	4:02
3.	"Bite It Like a Bulldog"	Mr Lordi	Mr Lordi, OX	3:29
4.	"Monsters Keep Me Company"	Mr Lordi	Mr Lordi, Amen, Kita	5:28
5.	"Man Skin Boots"	Mr Lordi, Lipp	Mr Lordi	3:42
6.	"Dr. Sin Is In"	Mr Lordi	Amen, Kita	3:37
7.	"The Ghosts of the Heceta Head"	Mr Lordi, Lipp	Mr Lordi, Amen	3:48
8.	"Evilyn"	Mr Lordi	Mr Lordi	4:00
9.	"The Rebirth of the Countess"	Mr Lordi, Awa	Awa	1:59
10.	"Raise Hell in Heaven"	Mr Lordi, Lipp	Mr Lordi	3:32
11.	"Deadache"	Mr Lordi, Lipp	Mr Lordi	3:28
12.	"Devil Hides Behind Her Smile"	Mr Lordi, Lipp	Mr Lordi	4:12
13.	"Missing Miss Charlene"	Mr Lordi, Lipp	Mr Lordi, Pete Kangas	5:10
Total length:				46:07

=== Bonus tracks ===
There are five different versions of the album, four of which have different bonus tracks. Each version was released by a different record company, hence the differing tracks.

iTunes version
No.	Title	Lyrics	Music	Length
14.	"Dead Bugs Bite"	Mr Lordi, Lipp	Mr Lordi	3:48
Total length:				49:55

Digipak version
No.	Title	Lyrics	Music	Length
14.	"Hate at First Sight"	Mr Lordi, Lipp	Amen, Kita	3:33
Total length:				49:40

Finnish version
No.	Title	Lyrics	Music	Length
14.	"The House" (Dingo cover)	Mr Lordi, Lipp	Neumann	4:15
Total length:				50:22

Japanese version
No.	Title	Lyrics	Music	Length
14.	"Where's the Dragon"	Mr Lordi, Lipp	Kita, OX, Lipp	3:01
15.	"Beast Loose in Paradise"	Mr Lordi	Mr Lordi	3:10
Total length:				52:18

== Personnel ==
Lordi

- Mr Lordi – vocals, artwork, art direction, layout
- Amen – guitars
- Kita – drums, backing vocals, engineering
- OX – bass
- Awa – keyboards

Additional musicians

- Eric Schäfer – outro (13)
- Pete Kangas – outro (13)
- Johanna Askola-Putaansuu – noise (5)
- Sandra Mittica – voice (9)
- Frida – noise (3)
- Shoemaker's Kids Quire – choir

Production

- Tracy Lipp – recording
- Jari Pailamo – engineering
- Jetro Vainio – engineering
- Ossi-Isso Tuomela – engineering
- Jesse Vainio – mixing
- Svante Forsbäck – mastering
- Nino Laurenne – production
- Petri Haggrén – photography

== Chart ==
Chart (2008)	Peak position
Austria Albums Chart	51
Finland Albums Chart	5
Sweden Albums Chart	42
Switzerland Albums Chart	73
German Albums Chart	33
UK Rock Albums Chart	38
US Top Heatseekers Chart	13
European Top 100 Albums	71
Top Heatseekers (Northeast)	6
Billboard Top Independent Albums	37

== Release history ==
Country	Release date
Germany	24 October 2008
United Kingdom	27 October 2008
Worldwide on iTunes	27 October 2008
United States	October 28, 2008
Japan	29 October 2008
Finland	29 October 2008
