= Festo (disambiguation) =

Festo may refer to:

- FESTO (Esperanto meeting), a yearly French Esperanto meeting organized by Espéranto-Jeunes
- Festo, German automation company
- Festo, Porcio Festo, was the Roman procurator of Iudaea Province, in succession to Antonius Felix
- Festo Corp. v. Shoketsu Kinzoku Kogyo Kabushiki Co., a landmark patent-law case
- Festo, a rapper and producer from Virginia
