= Get Heavy =

Studio album by Lordi
- Released: 1 November 2002
- Genre: Hard rock; heavy metal; shock rock
- Length: 38:25
- Label: BMG Finland; Drakkar Records
- Producer: TT Oksala

Lordi chronology
Get Heavy (2002)	The Monsterican Dream (2004)

Get Heavy is the debut studio album by the Finnish rock band Lordi, released in 2002. Although the bass guitarist Kalma appears on the cover artwork, all bass guitars were played by the former bass guitarist Magnum, who left after the recording and before the release of the album. The album is dedicated to Magnum.

== Track listing ==
All music and lyrics by Mr Lordi. Lyrics on "Monster Monster" were co-written by Tracy Lipp.

1. "Scarctic Circle Gathering" – 1:02
2. "Get Heavy" – 3:01
3. "Devil Is a Loser" – 3:29
4. "Rock the Hell Outta You" – 3:06
5. "Would You Love a Monsterman?" – 3:02
6. "Icon of Dominance" – 4:35
7. "Not the Nicest Guy" – 3:13
8. "Hellbender Turbulence" – 2:46
9. "Biomechanic Man" – 3:22
10. "Last Kiss Goodbye" – 3:07
11. "Dynamite Tonite" – 3:13
12. "Monster Monster" – 3:23
13. "13" – 1:06

Bonus material

14. "Don't Let My Mother Know" - 3:32 (North American, Japanese and vinyl editions)
15. "Hulking Dynamo" - 3:03 (vinyl edition)
16. Would You Love A Monsterman? (radio edit) - 03:04 (Japanese edition)

== Singles ==
1. "Would You Love a Monsterman?" - released 28 October 2002
2. "Devil is a Loser" - released 14 April 2003

== Charts ==
Chart (2002)	Peak position
Finland	3

== Certifications ==
Region	Certification	Certified units/sales
Finland (Musiikkituottajat)	2× Platinum	67,636

== Personnel ==
Credits for Get Heavy adapted from liner notes.

Lordi

- Mr Lordi – vocals, programming, artwork
- Amen – guitars, backing vocals
- Kita – drums, backing vocals
- Magnum – bass
- Enary – keyboards, piano, backing vocals

Additional musicians

- Tracy Lipp – vocals (12)

Production

- Timo Tapani Oksala – production, mixing (1, 13)
- Kevin Shirley – mixing
- Mika Jussila – mastering
- Jussi Rovanperä – engineering, editing (9)
- Mika Lindberg – artwork
- Jouko Lehtola – photography
- K. Kajava – photography
