= Kajto =

Musical group

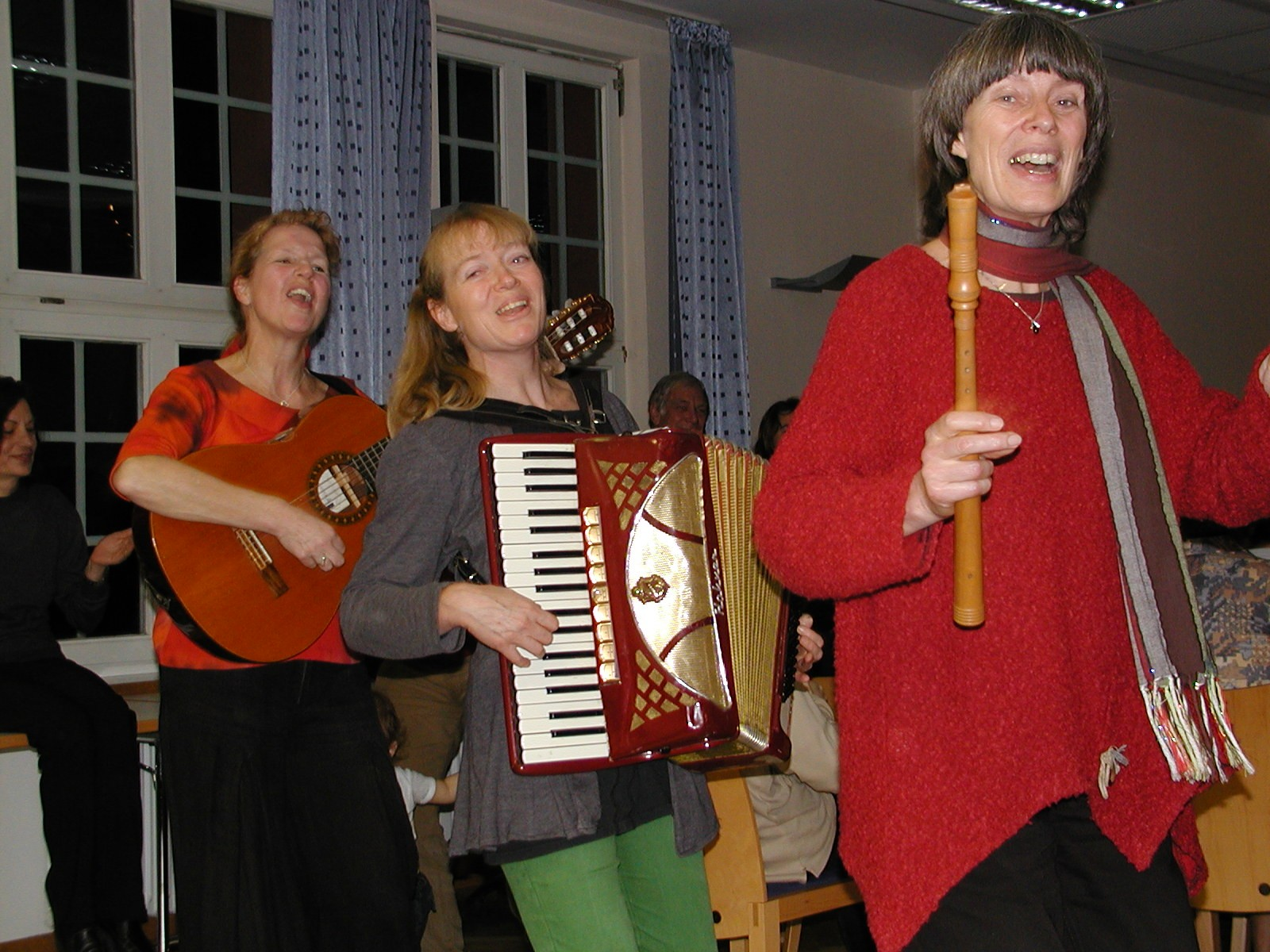
- From left to right: Ankie van der Meer, Marian Nesse, Marita Kruijswijk (not shown: Nanne Kalma)

Background information
- Also known as: Kat yn 't Seil
- Origin: Friesland, Netherlands
- Genres: Esperanto folk music, maritime music, balfolk
- Years active: 1988–present
- Labels: Vinilkosmo
- Members: Nanne Kalma; Ankie van der Meer
- Past members: Marita Kruijswijk; Marian Nesse

Kajto (pronounced /ˈkai̯to/) is a musical group from the Dutch province of Friesland performing acoustic folk music and balfolk in Esperanto drawing from the Frisian musical traditions of sea shanties, rounds and dances. Many of their songs are musical settings of Esperanto poetry, including works by Poul Thorsen, William Auld and Julio Baghy.

Kajto (meaning "kite" in Esperanto) was the name adopted by the Frisian folk group Kat yn 't Seil in 1988 for their performances of Esperanto material. For most of their history Kat yn 't Seil and Kajto were identical ensembles performing different repertoires under different names.

The group has performed extensively at Esperanto conventions and events, mostly in Europe, but also in North America and Australia, and released five albums on the label Vinilkosmo as a quartet and one as a duo. They have been described as one of the best known pop-folk groups in the Esperanto-speaking community, or Esperantujo, and have been praised for their tight arrangements. In 2004 the group was honored with the Franz Alois Meiners Culture Award (FAME Kulturpremio), which carries considerable prestige within the Esperanto community.

Until about 2007, Kajto consisted of the following members:

- Nanne Kalma (voice, guitar, mandolin, harmonica, violin)
- Marita Kruijswijk (voice, shawm, recorder)
- Ankie van der Meer (voice, guitar, banjo)
- Marian Nesse (voice, accordion)

The group no longer performs as a quartet; however, Nanne Kalma and Ankie van der Meer continue to perform under the name Kajto as a duo.

Former Kajto members Marita Kruijswijk and Marian Nesse have formed a new Esperanto folk group, Kapriol'! with Rutger Dijkstra and Ad Bos. Kapriol'! continues to perform some material from the repertoire of the original Kajto quartet.

== Discography ==
- Kajto (1989) "Kite"
- Procesio Multkolora (1991) "Colorful Procession"
- Tohuvabohuo (1993) "Tohu wa Bohu"
- Masko (1999) "Mask"
- Lokomotivo Rulu Nun! (2004) "Now, Locomotive, Run!"
- Duopo (2011) "A Pair"

The song "Ansero – Vanelo" was included in the compilation Vinilkosmo kompil' 1 (1995).

The album Masko was included in Vinilkosmo's Kolekto 2000.

== See also ==
- Esperanto music
- FESTO
