= Dolchamar =

Finland-based rock band

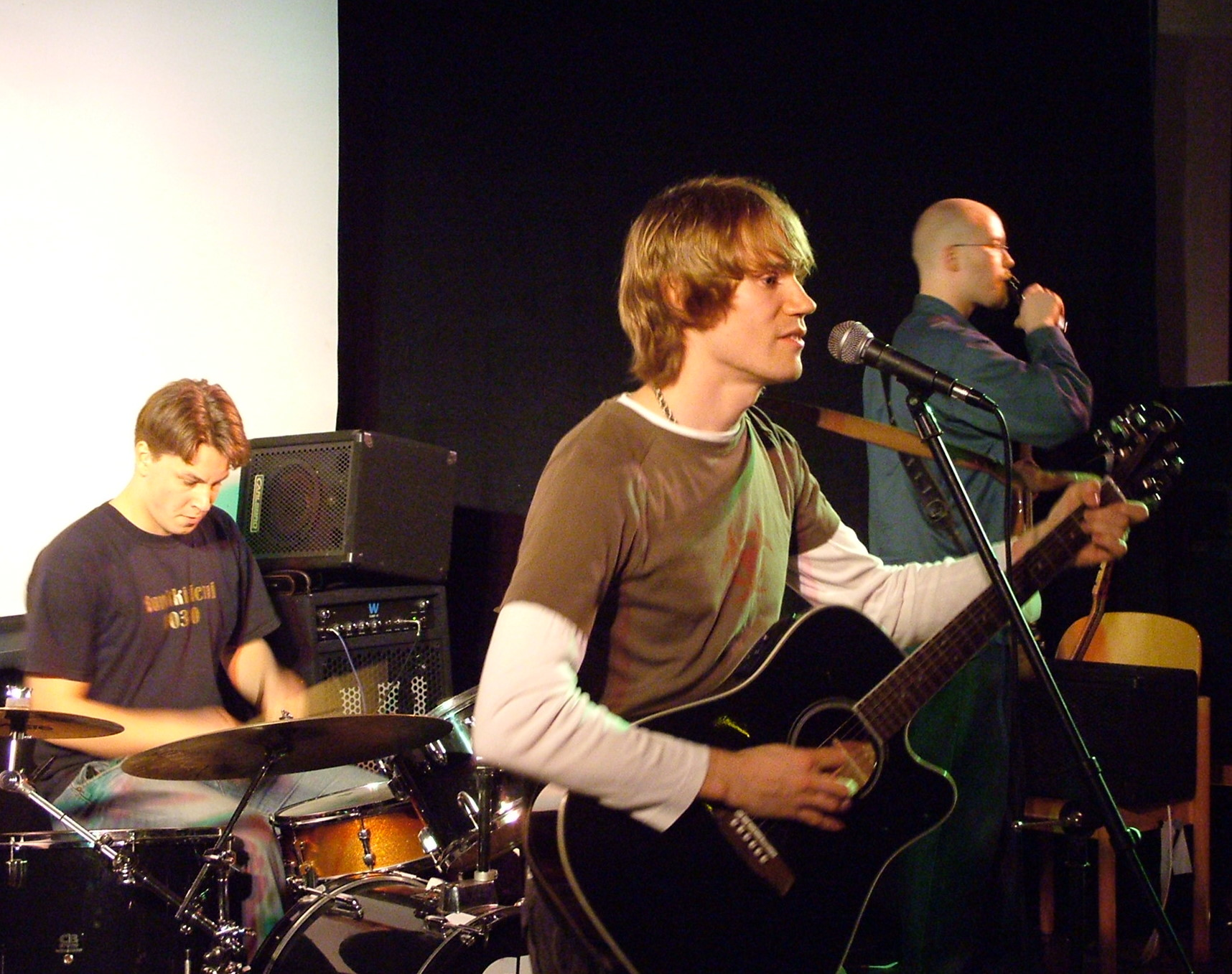
- Dolchamar in 2006

Background information
- Origin: London, England
- Genres: Electropop, indie pop
- Years active: 1999–present
- Label: Vinilkosmo
- Members: Patrik Austin; Hannu Linkola; Sebastian Dumitrescu; Andrei Dumitrescu
- Past members: Leena Peisa

Dolchamar is a rock band formed in London and currently based in Finland that performs in the language Esperanto. The band was formed in 1999 by Patrik Austin after his departure from Punaiset Messiaat, and was instantly signed on for the French Vinilkosmo record company, and as of 2014 the band resides in Finland. In 2003, they changed their name from Dolcxamar to Dolchamar, a change between the two conventions for representing the Esperanto word dolĉamar', pronounced [doltʃaˈmar] — poetic for dolĉamaro (literally "sweet bitterness"). As a form of wordplay, dolĉamaro is also Esperanto for Solanum dulcamara.

== Members ==
=== Members as of 2014 ===
- Patrik Austin – vocals, guitar
- Hannu Linkola – drums, percussion
- Sebastian Dumitrescu – bass
- Andrei Dumitrescu – synthesizer

=== Former members ===
- Leena Peisa (2003–2005) – synthesizer, vocals

== Ĉu vi pretas? ==
Ĉu vi pretas? is a hip hop song by the Esperanto band Dolchamar, on the album Lingvo Intermonda. The title comes from the chorus challenging, Ĉu vi pretas por la veno de Dolchamar? ("Are you ready for the coming of Dolchamar?"). The punchline Ĉu vi pretas? is an idiomatic way of asking one whether they are ready. It originally appeared briefly in a song by La Mondanoj, an 80's Esperanto hard rock band, and has now become a common catch phrase among Esperanto users.

== Albums ==
- Trejn Tu Noŭer (2009)
  1. Trejn Tu Noŭer
  2. 2Gether 4Awhile
  3. M.T.R.
  4. River
  5. Clavis
  6. Ni Festis Unu Nokton
  7. Experimento música
  8. La Pordisto
  9. Ho Abio
  10. -if-
  11. Des Pli
  12. La Fariseo
- Rebela Sono (2005)
  1. Junaj idealistoj
  2. Himno de Esperhe
  3. Akcidentoj
  4. Ni chiuj ni
  5. ...Kaj chi tio povas ighi nenio
  6. Kontra krusadanto
  7. Solaj paroj
  8. Subamighi
  9. Simia kaptilo
  10. Kr3yza festema injo
  11. Chinokta sento
  12. En Grekia
- Elektronika kompilo (2003) – Dolchamar contributed two titles
- Lingvo Intermonda (2000) (part of Kolekto 2000)
  1. Malbonulo
  2. Ĉu vi pretas
  3. Urbega nimfo
  4. Pacman
  5. Mi volas pli
  6. ...kaj pli
  7. Tunel' tra la ter'
  8. Lingvo intermonda
  9. F--iĝu!
- Kun ikso (demo) (1999)
  1. Malbonulo
  2. Pacman
  3. Mi volas pli
