= They Only Come Out at Night (Lordi song) =

Single by Lordi featuring Udo Dirkschneider

from the album The Arockalypse
- Released: 2 May 2007
- Recorded: 2006
- Genre: Hard rock
- Length: 7:01
- Label: Sony BMG
- Producer: Jyrki Tuovinen

Lordi featuring Udo Dirkschneider singles chronology
| "It Snows in Hell" (2006) | "They Only Come Out at Night" (2007) | "Beast Loose in Paradise" (2008) |

"They Only Come Out at Night" is the fourth single from the Finnish rock band Lordi's third album, The Arockalypse, and is one of the band's five singles that has not been made into a music video (along with "My Heaven Is Your Hell", "Beast Loose in Paradise", "Deadache", and "Rock Police").

== Overview ==
Udo Dirkschneider guest stars in the song. Although a promo version was released by Lordi's German record label, Drakkar Entertainment, it hasn't appeared in stores. Instead, the promo single was handed out at some events in Germany in February 2006. The B-side of the Finnish version is a cover of the Accept song, "Midnight Mover", which was recorded in 2003 in a radio studio during a live broadcast. The song charted at number six in Finland.

== Track lists ==
Finnish edition

1. "They Only Come Out at Night" (featuring Udo Dirkschneider) – 3:37
2. "Midnight Mover (live)" – 3:26

German promo version

1. "They Only Come Out at Night"
2. "Supermonstars"
