= FESTO (Esperanto meeting) =

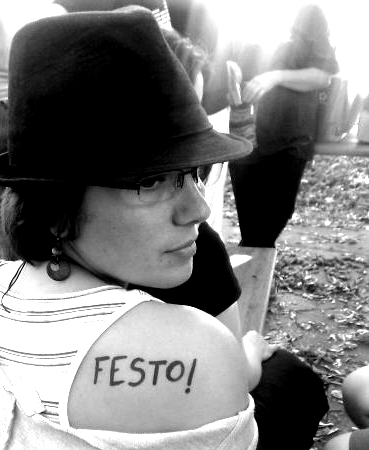
Photo of an attendee at FESTO 2009

FESTO is an annual week-long Esperanto youth meeting organized by Espéranto-Jeunes, the French branch of the Universal Esperanto Association's youth wing TEJO. It is held in a different city every summer and serves as a venue for cultural exchange, offering an occasion for Esperantists from many lands to improve their facility in the Esperanto language. Except in 2009 and 2013, meetings have been held in France.

With as few as 36 or as many as 145 attendees from 25 countries, the youth meet is renowned both for its rich musical program organized in partnership with the EUROKKA rock music collective and for its deliberately anarchic spirit: FESTO is an acronym for Franca Esperanto-Semajno Terure Organizita, ("French Esperanto Week, Terribly Organized").

Many international artists have found an appreciative audience after their first performance at FESTO. During the 2009 event, every night one or two concerts were held, featuring groups like Gijom (France), Initials DC (Germany), Kapriol (Netherlands), La Pafklik (France), Stefo (Germany), Supernova (Brazil), Tone (Brazil). Some non-Esperantist groups played as well, such as Alles Francizka.

== History ==
FESTO first occurred in Lyon in 1996, then was held every summer except in 2001 — when the International Youth Congress of Esperanto, a worldwide meeting of young Esperantists, took place in France — and in 2008, when the Espéranto-Jeunes group experienced a decline in membership numbers.

FESTO returned in 2009, thanks to greater motivation and a reinvigoration from new members. That year's festival was held in Zwingenberg, Germany, after the German youth association, German Esperanto Youth (GEJ), provided a subsidy.

In 2010, the association had organized the meeting in Toulouse, but a month before the festival was to begin, Paul Sabatier University, a branch campus of the University of Toulouse where the meeting was to have been held, announced its refusal to allow the use of its premises. The university did not disclose the reason for cancelling the reservation, but with the help of EUROKKA and the independent Vinilkosmo record label, the meeting was hastily relocated to Donneville, 15 km from Toulouse.

The City of Toulouse and the Sicoval regional district to the southeast of Toulouse furnished large tents to provide sheltered dining halls and dormitories. Despite the confusion over the venue, the event was attended by 145 participants, and ten bands from Netherlands, Denmark, Sweden, Catalonia and France performed. The event also featured a cybercafé, a small theatre projecting five different films and a discotheque with several international disk jockeys. Some participants also availed themselves of the chance to tour Toulouse museums and to take a mini-course in Occitan, the local dialect.

== Venues ==
- 1996: Lyon.
- 1997: Saint-Raphaël.
- 1998: during the World Congress of Esperanto in Montpellier.
- 2000: Saint-Chamond Festo was replaced by Journées Solidaires, organized by JEFO and other associations.
- 2002: Senĉesa festo ("Endless festival") in Château de Grésillon.
- 2003: Paimpol/Plouézec.
- 2004: La plej stulta renkontiĝo ("The most stupid meeting") in Orléans.
- 2005: Amo ĉiam ("Love always") in Saint-Amans-Valtoret.
- 2006: Kastela viv’ ("Castle life") in Château de Grésillon.
- 2007: Muzikume ("Musically") in Montoire-sur-le-Loir.
- 2009: Festo, festo, festo! in Zwingenberg, Germany.
- 2010: Esperanto Muzikfestival in Donneville.
- 2011: Château de Grésillon.
- 2012: Métabief.
- 2013: Reveno al Amikejo ("Return to Friendship Place") in La Calamine/Kelmis, capital city of what was Neutral Moresnet, Belgium.
- 2014: Pont-de-Barret.
- 2017: FESTetO ("Small festival") in Château de Grésillon.
- 2024: Vindry-sur-Turdine.
