= Neljänsuora =

Finnish pop band

Neljänsuora is a Finnish pop band originally from Lohja.

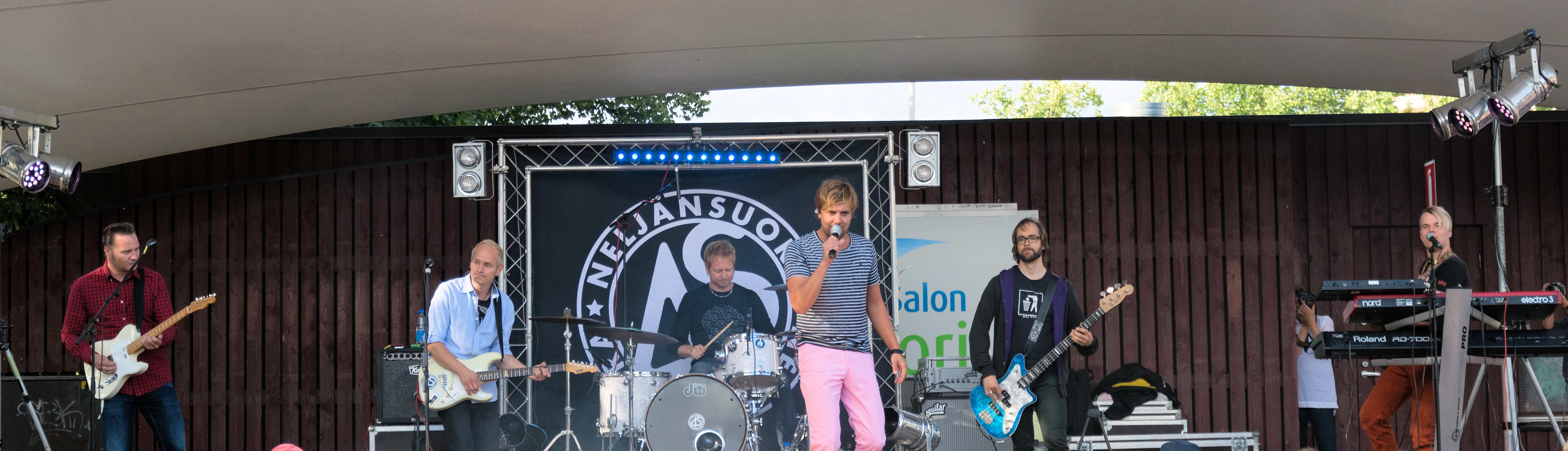
Neljän suora in 2013 during a concert

Formed in 1998, it showcased the vocals of Antti Ketonen, earlier of the band Alvarn. Neljänsuora original band (made up of Antti Ketonen, Juha Mäki, Esko Mäki, Mikko Hägerström and Urho Sevón) was greatly affected by metal music.

In later years, band line-up changed with Urho Sevón leaving in 2005 and Esko Mäki more recently in 2011.

New members were admitted like Jarkko Pietilä and Jussi Välimaa (2005-2006) and they turned into a pop band. After long-standing member Esko Mäki left as drummer in 2011, he was replaced by Johan Murtojärvi.

The band is signed to WEA / Warner Music label.

== Members ==
Present members

- Antti Ketonen (vocals) (1998–present)
- Juha Mäki (guitar, violin, backing vocals) 1998–present
- Jarkko Pietilä (keyboards, backing vocals) 2005–present
- Jussi Välimaa (bass, trumpet) 2006–present
- Johan Murtojärvi (drums) 2011–present

Former members

- Mikko Hägerström (keyboards, backing vocals)
- Urho Sevón (bass, backing vocals) 1998-2005
- Esko Mäki (drums) 1998-2011

== Discography ==
=== Albums ===
Year	Album	Peak positions
Year	Album	FIN
2003	Sun kanssa	
2005	Sua vain hän kaipaa	
2006	X	
2007	Hankotien laitaan	
2009	Teetä ja paahtoleipää	23
2011	Valtava maailma	6
2013	Riisiä hiuksissa	8
2016	Suurimmat Hitit 2003–2016	14

=== Singles ===
(selective)

Year	Album	Peak positions	Certification
Year	Album	FIN	Certification
2009	"Siipirikko"	20	
