= Donneville =

- Commune
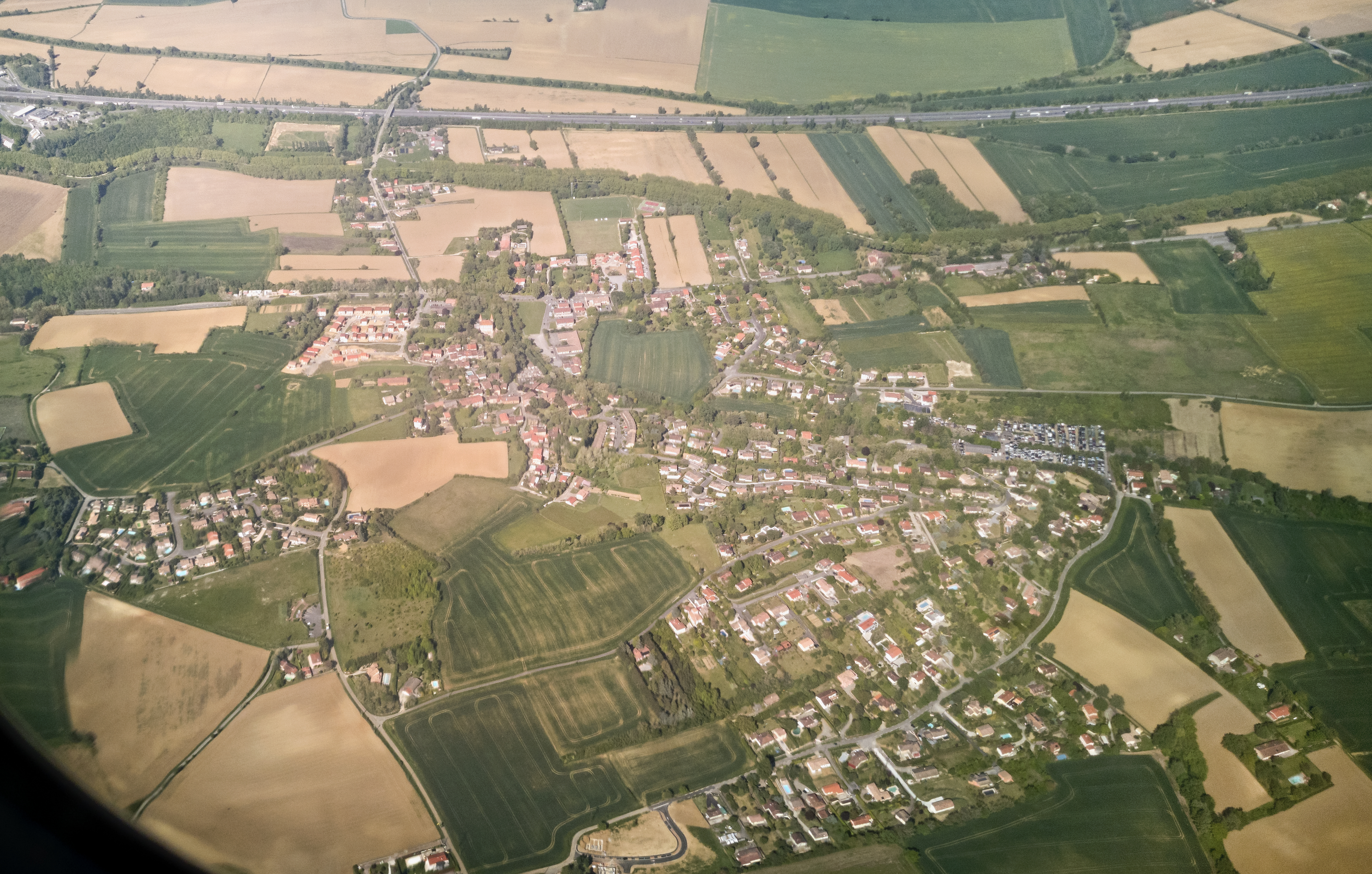
- Donneville

- Coat of arms
- Location of Donneville
- Location within France Location within Occitanie
- Coordinates: 43°28′25″N 1°32′59″E
- Country: France
- Region: Occitania
- Department: Haute-Garonne
- Arrondissement: Toulouse
- Canton: Escalquens
- Intercommunality: CA Sicoval

Government
  - Mayor (2020–2026): Émilienne Poumirol
- Area^{1}: 2.67 km^{2} (1.03 sq mi)
- Elevation: 155 m (509 ft)
- Highest elevation: 236 m (774 ft)
- Lowest elevation: 153 m (502 ft)
- Population (2023): 1,139
  - Density: 427/km^{2} (1,100/sq mi)
- Time zone: UTC+01:00 (CET)
  - Summer (DST): UTC+02:00 (CEST)
- INSEE/Postal code: 31162 /31450
- ^{1} French Land Register data, which excludes lakes, ponds, glaciers > 1 km^{2} (0.386 sq mi or 247 acres) and river estuaries.

Donneville (French pronunciation: [dɔnvil]; Occitan: Dònevila) is a commune in the Haute-Garonne department in southwestern France.

== Population ==
Historical population
Year	Pop.	±% p.a.
1968	305	—
1975	378	+3.11%
1982	615	+7.20%
1990	682	+1.30%
1999	781	+1.52%
2007	1,026	+3.47%
2012	1,044	+0.35%
2017	1,009	−0.68%
2023	1,139	+2.04%
Source: INSEE

The inhabitants of the commune are known as Donnevillois in French.

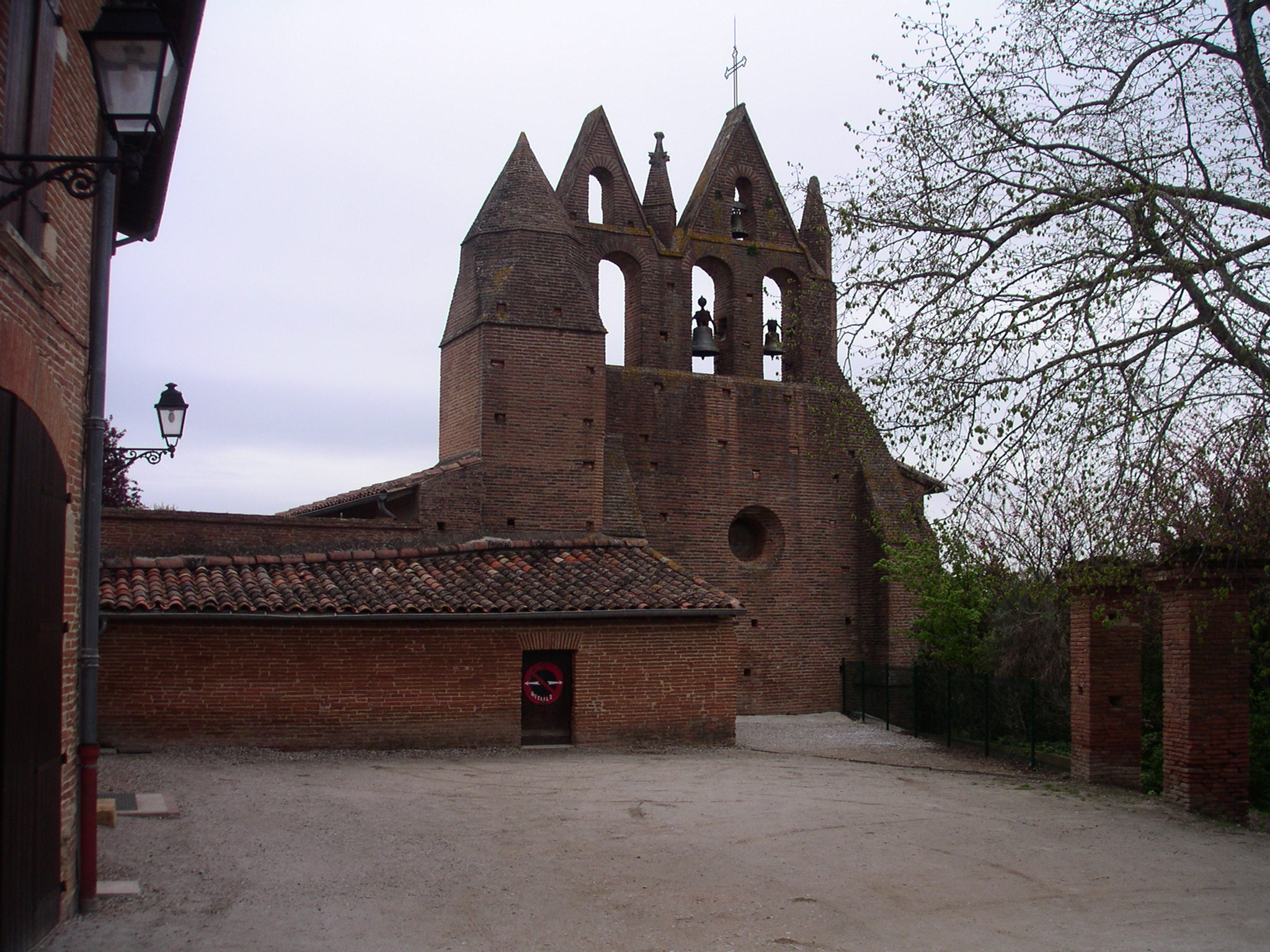
The church in Donneville

== See also ==
- Communes of the Haute-Garonne department
