= Jean-Marc Leclercq =

French musician and Esperantist

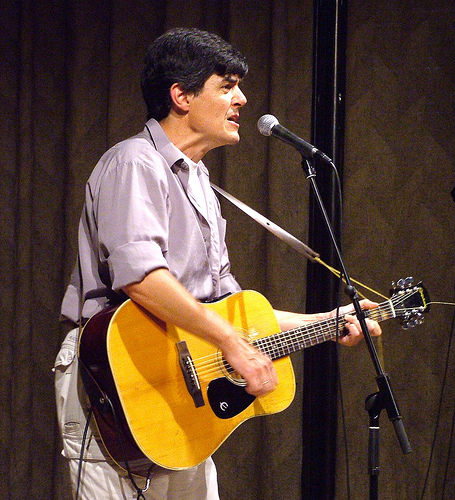
- JoMo during a concert in Antwerp (Belgium) 2007
- Born: Jean-Marc Leclercq; 10 October 1961 (age 64); Toulouse, France
- Other names: JoMo jOmO
- Occupation: Musician
- Years active: 1977–present

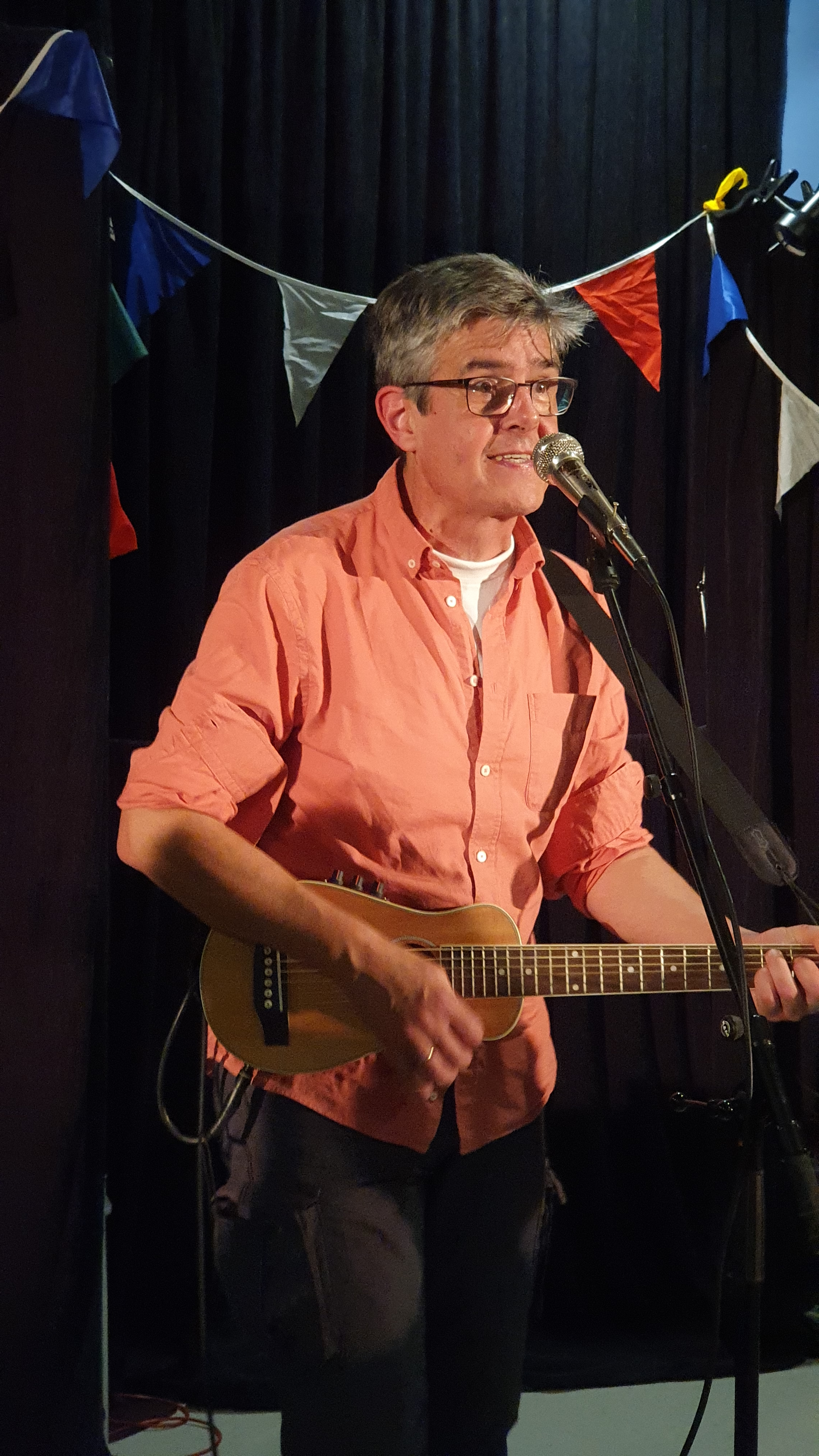
JoMo during a concert in Wiesbaden (Germany), 2022

Jean-Marc Leclercq (also known as JoMo) is a French singer and Esperantist from Toulouse. The former singer of the group Les Rosemary’s Babies (or La Rozmariaj Beboj) who published two CDs with the French record production company Boucherie et Willins Production, he holds the Guinness Record for singing rock and traditional songs in over 22 languages.

He also plays with two groups, as Jomo and the Libertarians (JoMo kaj Liberecanoj), and occasionally with Jomo and the Mammoths (JoMo kaj la mamutoj).

== Discs ==
- Jomo slavumas (2006)
- Hotel Desperado, de Esperanto Desperado (2004) – JoMo sings lead in the song "Ne permesas".
- JoMo Friponas! (2001)
  1. Ĉu vi volas danci?
  2. La Bambo!
  3. Lernu nun
  4. La simiulo
  5. Esperanto
  6. Sur la mar'
  7. Ĵambalajo
  8. Kisu min
  9. Al Durruti
  10. En la IJoKo
  11. Hej la nizoj!
  12. La virbovo kaj la luno
  13. Sub potenco de la leĝo
  14. Suno sunu!
- JoMo kaj Liberecanoj (1998) – part of Kolekto 2000
  1. Al la barikadoj
  2. Maĥnovŝĉino
  3. La eskapinto
  4. Kajuna knabo
  5. La blondulineto
  6. Alumetujo
  7. Ĉeboksaro
  8. Kun ci
- Vinilkosmo-kompil' 2 (1996) – He sings only in one song: Ali Bensali.
- Vinilkosmo-kompil' 1 (1995) – La Rozmariaj Beboj sing one song: Ĉe vi min forprenu.

== Books ==
- Jean-Marc Leclercq, Sèrgi Javaloyès: Le gascon de poche. Assimil, Chennevières sur Marne 2004, ISBN 2-7005-0345-7.
- Jean-Marc Leclercq: Ucraïna. Institut d’Estudis Occitans, Puylaurens 2006, ISBN 2-85910-385-6.
- Jean-Marc Leclercq: Diccionari de rimas. Per Noste, Orthez 2012, ISBN 978-2-86866-097-8.
