= Erna Siikavirta =

Finnish keyboardist

- Birth name: Erna Inari Kaarina Siikavirta
- Also known as: Ms. Erna, Enary, Magistra Nocte
- Born: 8 October 1977 (age 47)
- Origin: Espoo, Finland
- Genres: Hard rock, heavy metal, black metal
- Occupation: Keyboardist
- Years active: 1997–2010, 2018–present

Erna Inari Kaarina Siikavirta (born 8 October 1977) is a Finnish keyboard player. She is best known as a member of the rock band Lordi, which she joined in 1997 under the stage name Enary. She left the band in 2005, at the request of the other members.

In 1998, Erna joined Children of Bodom on their first European tour, temporarily replacing keyboardist Janne Wirman. In the same year, Erna sang soprano on the album Fallen Angel's Symphony for the German band Ancient Ceremony. In 1999, she played keyboard for Sinergy during their live gigs. Erna was also keyboardist for the Finnish group Grain, until their split in 2001. In 2001 and 2002, she played synthesizer in Markku Klami's Meditation (op. 10/1) and Hymn for Christmas.

In 2006, Erna joined the Finnish "gravedigger metal" band Deathlike Silence, replacing former keyboardist Mr. Rigor Mortis. In 2008 she had to leave because of her pregnancy, eventually moving to the band Arthemesia, which was disbanded in 2010.

== Discography ==
- Ancient Ceremony: Fallen Angel's Symphony (1998)
- Lordi: Get Heavy (2002)
- Lordi: The Monsterican Dream (2004)
- Deathlike Silence: Vigor Mortis (2007)
- Deathlike Silence: Saturday Night Evil (2009)
