= Leena Peisa =

Finnish keyboardist

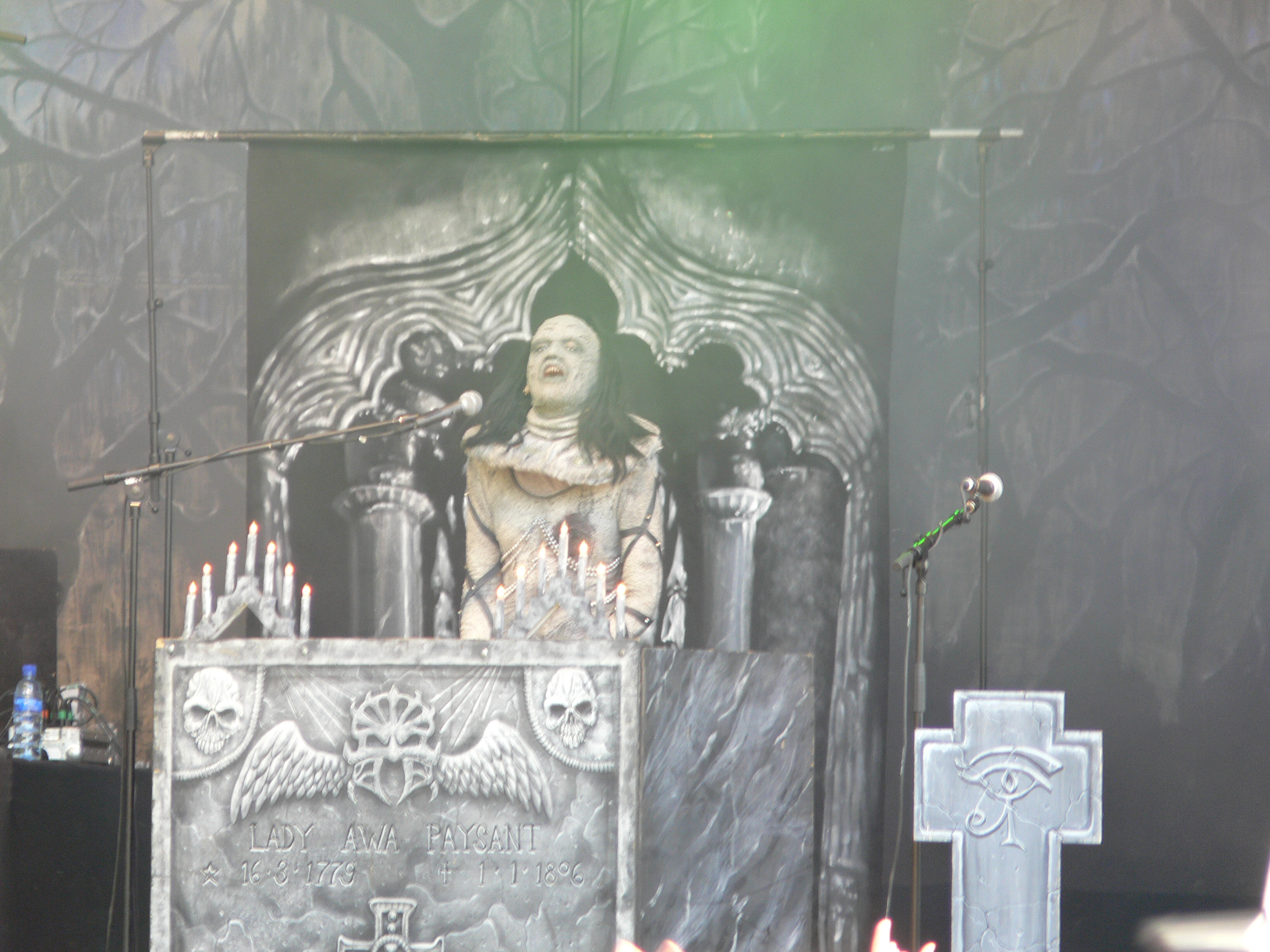
- Awa on stage in 2006

Background information
- Birth name: Leena Maria Peisa
- Also known as: Lady Awa, Lady Awa De Paysant, Lende Mielihyva
- Born: 16 March 1979 (age 46); Vantaa, Finland
- Genres: Hard rock; heavy metal
- Occupation: Musician
- Instrument(s): Keyboards, synthesizer, vocals
- Years active: 1994–2012, 2018–present
- Member of: Dingo
- Formerly of: Punaiset Messiaat; Dolchamar; Lordi

Leena Maria "Awa" Peisa (born 16 March 1979) is a Finnish keyboard player. Her former bands include Lordi, Punaiset Messiaat and Dolchamar. Currently, she plays in Lordi's ex-drummer's Kita's band "Sampsa Astala & Qma".

== Biography ==
Leena Maria Peisa was born in Vantaa although she spent her teenage years in Porvoo. She has been playing the piano since she was six years old. She took to playing the synthesizer in her teens. Her first band was Punaiset Messiaat which she joined in autumn 1994. While in Punaiset Messiaat she used the stage name "Lende Mielihyvä". Mielihyvä is the Finnish word for pleasure. After Punaiset Messiaat disbanded in 1998, Peisa concentrated on her education and studied Social Studies at the University of Helsinki.

In 2003, she joined the Esperanto band Dolchamar, and in 2005 was invited to join Lordi by drummer Kita to replace the keyboardist Enary. In Lordi, she takes on the persona of an unearthly vampire countess. The name Awa comes from Be Aware. On the band's website she is said to have many other names. Some Greek television channels claim to have videos and photos of the band without stage make-up. On 25 July it was announced through the band's website that she is leaving the band after their concert on 11 August 2012.

In February 2018, Leena joined the Finnish rock band Dingo, replacing former keyboardist Pete Nuotio.

== Discography ==
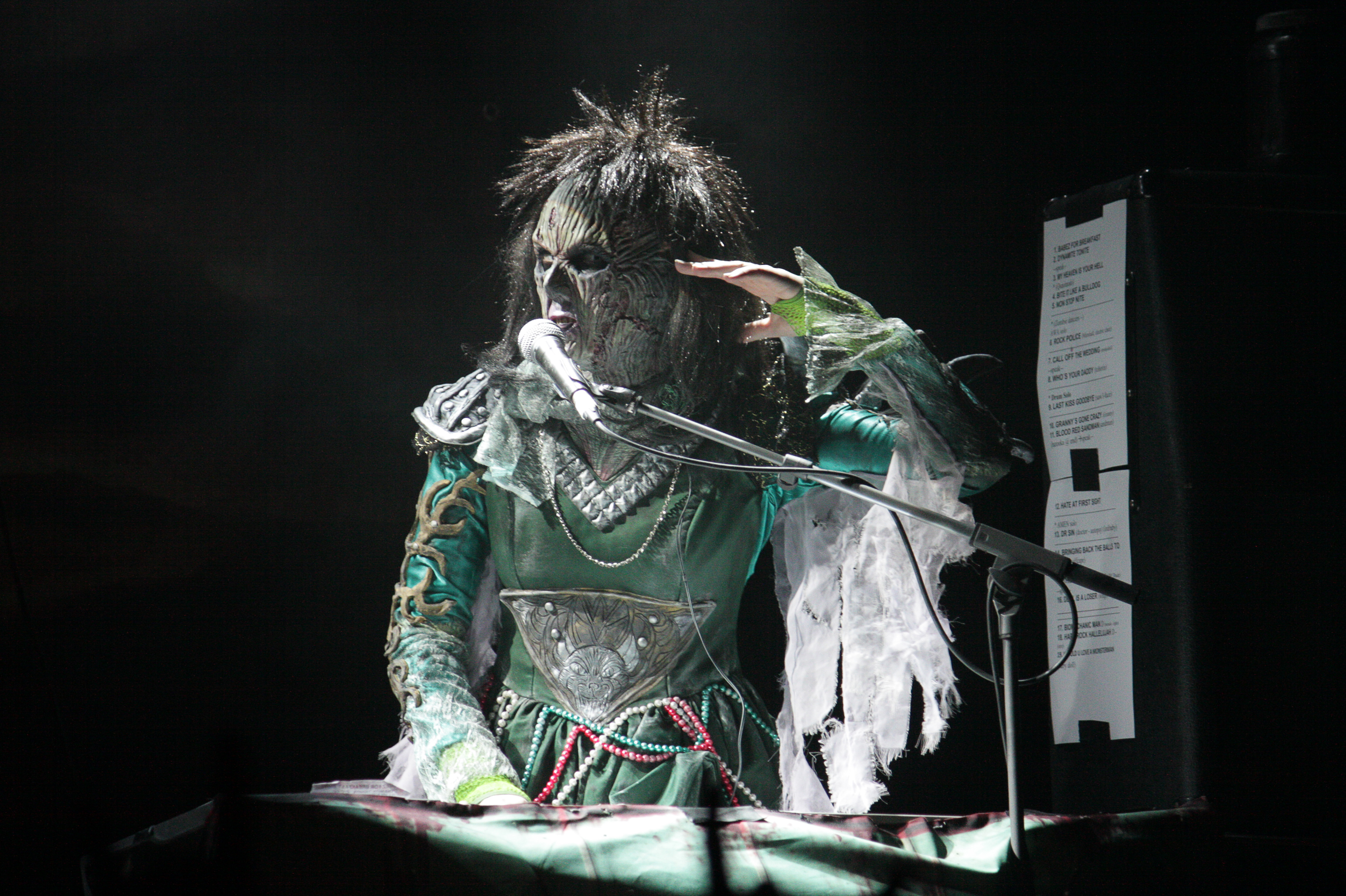
Peisa performing in 2010

=== Punaiset Messiaat ===
Studio albums

- Back in Bu$ine$$ (1995)
- Lemmentykki ('Cannon of Love') (1996)
- Älä osta; varasta ('Don't buy; steal') (1997)

EPs

- Punainen Iktivisto (1992)
- Punk on pop ('Punk Is Hip') (1996)
- Tuu mun luo ('Come to Me') (1996)
- Hornan hovin häät ('A Wedding at the Abode of Evil Spirits') (1997)

=== Dolchamar ===
Studio albums

- Rebela Sono (The Rebel Sound) (2005)

=== Lordi ===
Studio albums

- The Arockalypse (2006)
- Deadache (2008)
- Babez for Breakfast (2010)

Awards and achievements
Preceded by (Greece) Elena Paparizou with "My Number One"	Winner of the Eurovision Song Contest; 2006 (as part of Lordi)	Succeeded by (Serbia) Marija Šerifović with "Molitva"
Preceded by Geir Rönning with "Why?"	Finland in the Eurovision Song Contest; 2006 (as part of Lordi)	Succeeded by Hanna Pakarinen with "Leave Me Alone"
