= Mr Lordi =

Finnish rock musician (born 1974)

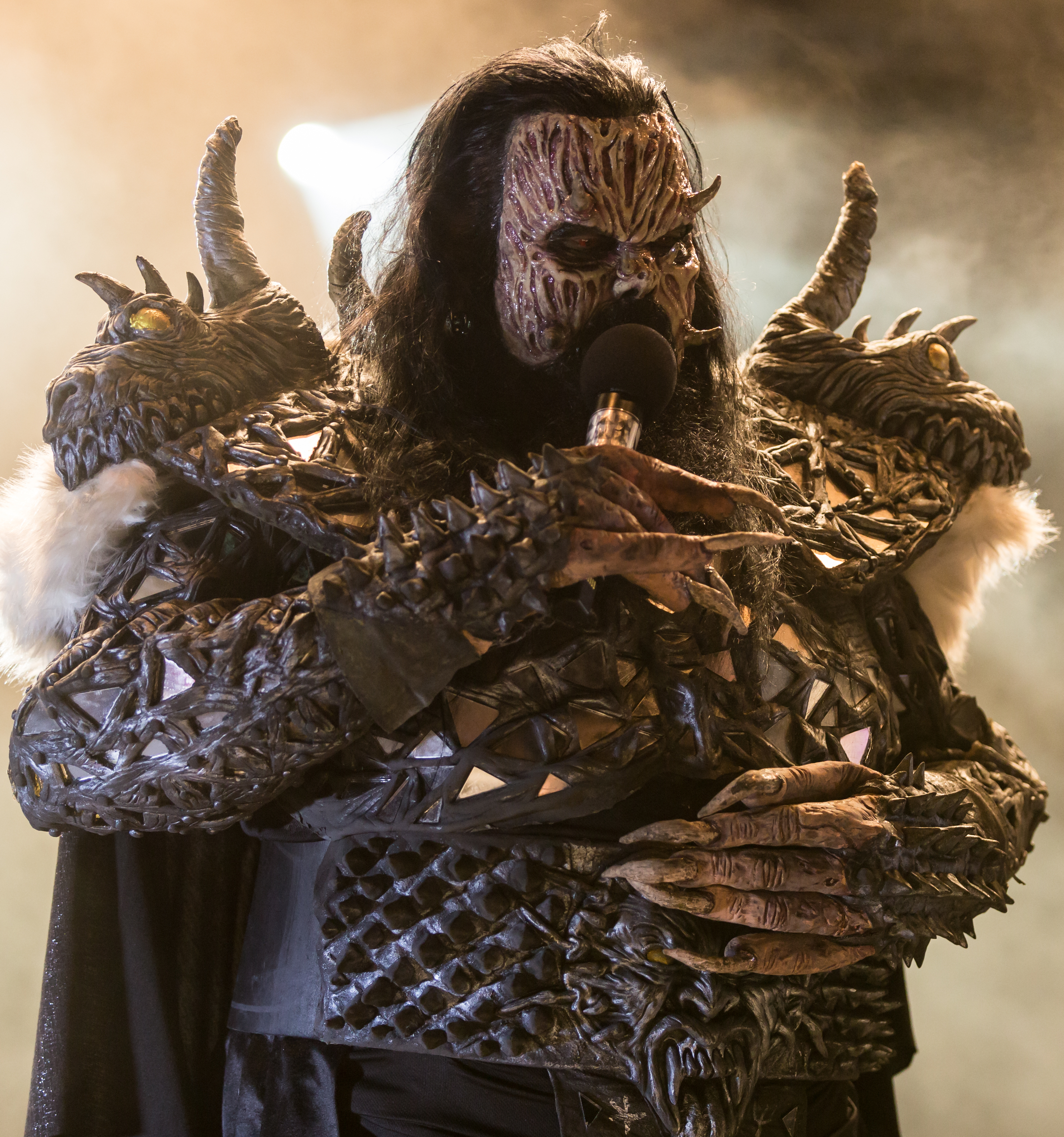
- Mr Lordi on stage during a Lordi concert in 2025

Background information
- Also known as: Mr Lordi; Hulk from Hell; Biomechanic Man; Mr L
- Born: Tomi Petteri Putaansuu; 15 February 1974 (age 52); Rovaniemi, Lapland, Finland
- Occupations: Musician, songwriter, painter, special effects make-up artist, comics artist, graphic designer
- Instruments: Vocals, guitar, drums
- Years active: 1987–present
- Member of: Lordi

Tomi Petteri Putaansuu (born 15 February 1974), known professionally as Mr Lordi, is a Finnish musician, businessman, special effect make-up artist, songwriter, painter, comics artist and graphic designer. He is best known as the lead vocalist of the rock band Lordi. In the band he is responsible for songwriting and creating all the masks, costumes, graphics and stage props.

Mr Lordi has written songs and provided album artwork for bands such as Rotten Sound, Jope Ruonansuu, Domination Black, Grandevils and Agnes Pihlava. He has also had a few art exhibitions in Finland.

All publicity photographs of Mr Lordi have his face concealed with his mask and stage makeup.

== Career ==
=== Music ===
Before Lordi, Mr Lordi had played in many rock bands from Rovaniemi and was best known as the lead singer for his former band Wanda Whips Wall Street. He founded Lordi as his solo project in 1992, when he was 18 years old. He produced the first demo, Napalm Market, in 1993. Mr Lordi described Lordi's desired sound as "a song made by Kiss back in 1983, covered by Pantera in 1992 and remixed by Puff Daddy". Lordi became a band four years later when Mr Lordi met Lordi's original line-up during a Finnish Kiss cruise, organised by himself as a president of Kiss Army Finland.

While working as storyboard artist, Mr Lordi spent his freetime producing the first Lordi album Bend Over and Pray the Lord in 1997. He could, however, not find a publisher for the album and it was left unreleased. Since then, he has also illustrated a comic book featuring Lordi. After 2002, when the first single "Would You Love a Monsterman?" and the album Get Heavy were finally released by BMG Finland, Mr Lordi is still responsible for all the album artwork, merchandise design and masks and outfits of the band members. The songs he writes along with the other band members.

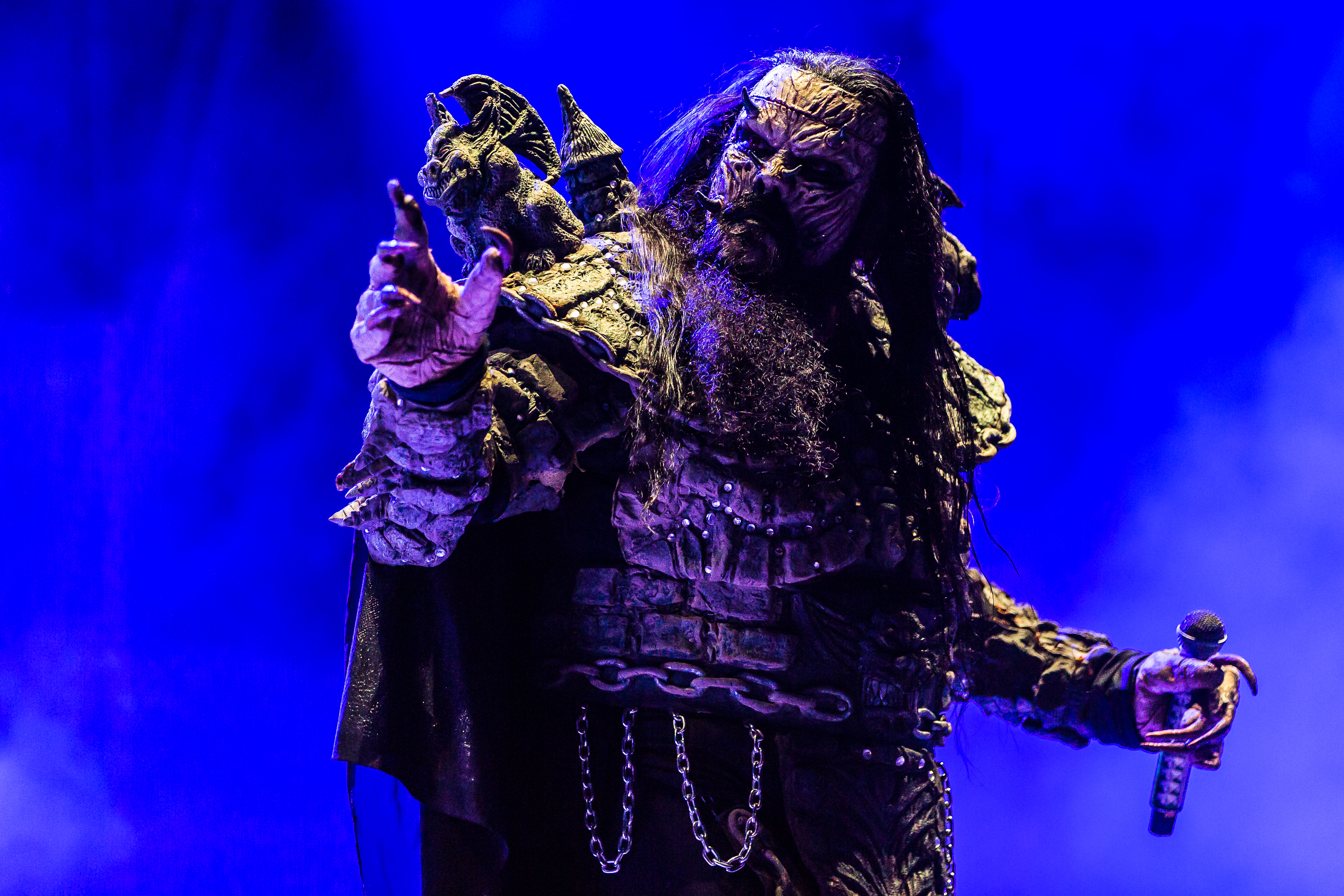
Mr Lordi performing at Rockharz Open Air 2024

Mr Lordi has written songs and made album covers for many Finnish bands and artists like Rotten Sound, Agnes Pihlava and Neljänsuora. Outside Finland, Mr Lordi has been featured as a live guest on U.D.O.'s and Doro Pesch's concerts.

In 2011, Mr Lordi created his own choir from Rovaniemi for the Finnish version of the Clash of the Choirs miniseries. He named his choir "Rock'n'Rollo" and invited the choir to perform in Lordi's anniversary concert in 2012.

=== Filmmaking ===
In the late 1980s, Mr Lordi started to make horror movies with friends. As a movie director and effects designer, he, along with the young movie makers Pete Riski (Lordi's future music video director), Petri Kangas, Kimmo Valtanen (to-be Sony BMG Finland CEO) and Tomi Yli-Suvanto, received many awards and represented Finland at international film festivals. Mr Lordi has also worked as a storyboard artist for Finnish movie producers and directed many Finnish music videos.

== Personal life ==
Born and raised in Rovaniemi, Mr Lordi became interested in monsters and special effects in his early youth, in major part through horror movies. He was also a fan of The Muppet Show and E.T. and was introduced to heavy metal through his friend Risto Niemi, when he was eight years old.

Always interested in masks and visual performances, he took special interest in Alice Cooper, W.A.S.P., Mötley Crüe, Kiss and Twisted Sister. He started bands with his friends and designed logos and album covers for all of them.

Mr Lordi did not do well at school – except for music and drawing. After years, he graduated as a media designer, specialising himself in video editing. He made Lordi's first music video, "Inferno", a seven-minute combination of horror fantasy and heavy metal music video, in 1995. The video featured Mr Lordi's friends in heavy makeup and masks and horror decorations made by Mr Lordi – and Mr Lordi himself singing without any makeup. Shortly thereafter, he met his future band members on a Kiss Army trip to Sweden and Lordi turned into a real band with four members – Mr Lordi, G-Stealer, Enary and Amen.

He married his long-time girlfriend Johanna Askola in early August 2006 in his home town Rovaniemi. The couple divorced in 2015.

== Character background ==
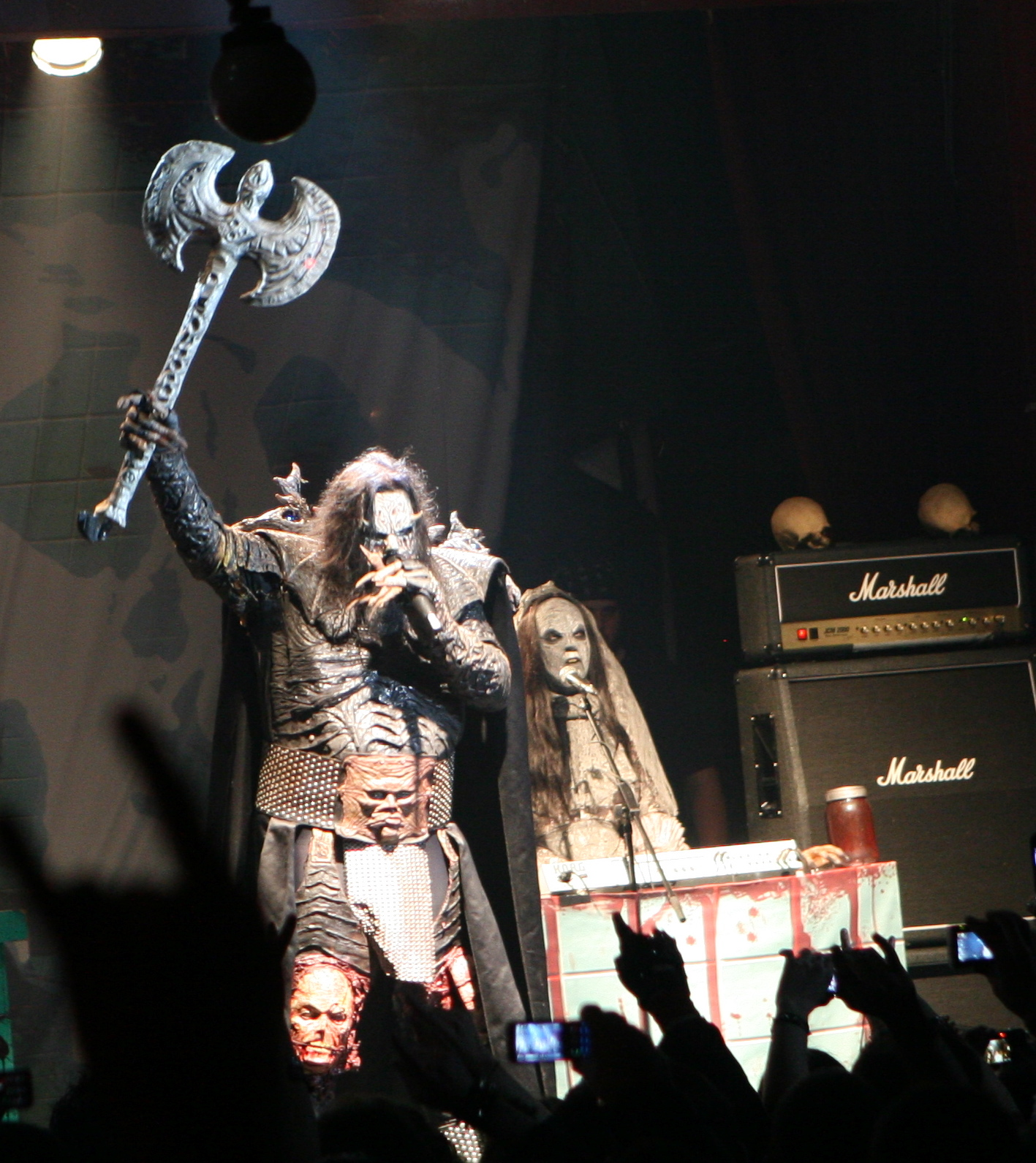
Mr Lordi holding up his axe, 2009

Like the other members in the band Lordi, Mr Lordi too has a fictional background story and appears as fictional monster in comic books and music videos of Lordi. His character has been described as the names "The Hulk from Hell", "The Most Fearsome Khan of All", "The Biomechanical Man" and "The Unholy Overlord of All Tremors". His best-known weapons are his biomechanic armour and an axe.

The fictional history of Mr Lordi tells that his father was a Demon of the South named the Duke of the Demons and his mother a Troll of the North named Angel. The Demons invaded Lapland and raped the Trolls. As a bastard son of both, Mr Lordi received the supernatural powers of them and during centuries appeared as several historical figures, such as Genghis Khan, Attila the Hun, Vlad the Impaler and Ivan the Terrible. After defeating the Demons and Trolls, as the Lord of Lapland, he rode in a sleigh, given to him by Santa Claus (Puuhkalakki), pulled by flying zombie reindeer.

According to one theory, Mr Lordi has spent centuries searching for his "One True Love", but has not found her. Kalmaged the Time-traveller tells that Mr Lordi has integrated himself to the magnetic field of the Earth and thus controls the whole planet and can now travel between different dimensions effortlessly. Mr Lordi has personally gathered the other band members as allies in the trans-dimensional war against their enemies.

== Discography ==
=== Other ===
- Various artists: Rovaniemi Rokkaa (1992) – includes Wanda Whips Wall Street's song "You're Dead Wrong"
- Various artists: Rockmurskaa (1995) – includes Lordi's song "Inferno" and Wanda Whips Wall Street's song "Caught the Black Fire"
- Agnes Pihlava: When the Night Falls (2006) – includes Mr Lordi's written song "Danger in Love"
- 1827 Infernal Musical: 1827 Infernal Musical (CD, 2010) – includes Mr Lordi's written song "Devil's crashing the party"
- Neljänsuora: Valtava Maailma (2011) – includes Mr Lordi's written song "Testamentti"
- Martti Servo: RoPS- Sinisellä Sydämellä (song, 2013) – song written by Mr Lordi

== Filmography ==
- Häjyt (1999) – storyboard
- Historiaa tehdään öisin (1999) – storyboard
- Kuilu (2001) – special effects make-up
- Rölli ja metsänhenki (2001) – storyboard
- Pahat pojat (2003) – storyboard
- The Kin (2004) – script/acting/storyboard/special effects make-up/music
- Dark Floors (2008) – script/acting/theme song
- Monsterman (2014) – documentary film about Mr Lordi and Lordi

== Other releases ==
=== Cover artwork by Mr Lordi ===
- Rotten Sound: Psychotic Veterinarian (1995)
- Domination Black: Fearbringer (2005)
- Martti Servo & Napander: Kestävällä pohjalla (2010)
- Rockamania: Rockamania (2010)
- Jope Ruonansuu: Jopetusministeri (2011)
- Jope Ruonansuu: Veljekset kuin kyljykset (2012)

=== Mr Lordi's art exhibitions in Finland ===
- Kulmagalleria: Mr Lordi's art exhibition (8–30 August 2009)
- Kulmagalleria: Ihmeellistä Mautonta Menoa (7–30 October 2011)
- Kauppakeskus Revontuli: Vistoja Kuvia (13 July – 11 August 2012)

Awards and achievements
Preceded by Christos Dantis	Eurovision Song Contest winning composers 2006	Succeeded by Vladimir Graić
Preceded by (Greece) Elena Paparizou with "My Number One"	Winner of the Eurovision Song Contest; 2006 (as part of Lordi)	Succeeded by (Serbia) Marija Šerifović with "Molitva"
Preceded by Geir Rönning with "Why?"	Finland in the Eurovision Song Contest; 2006 (as part of Lordi)	Succeeded by Hanna Pakarinen with "Leave Me Alone"
