= Amen (musician) =

Finnish guitarist (born 1972)

Jussi Sydänmaa
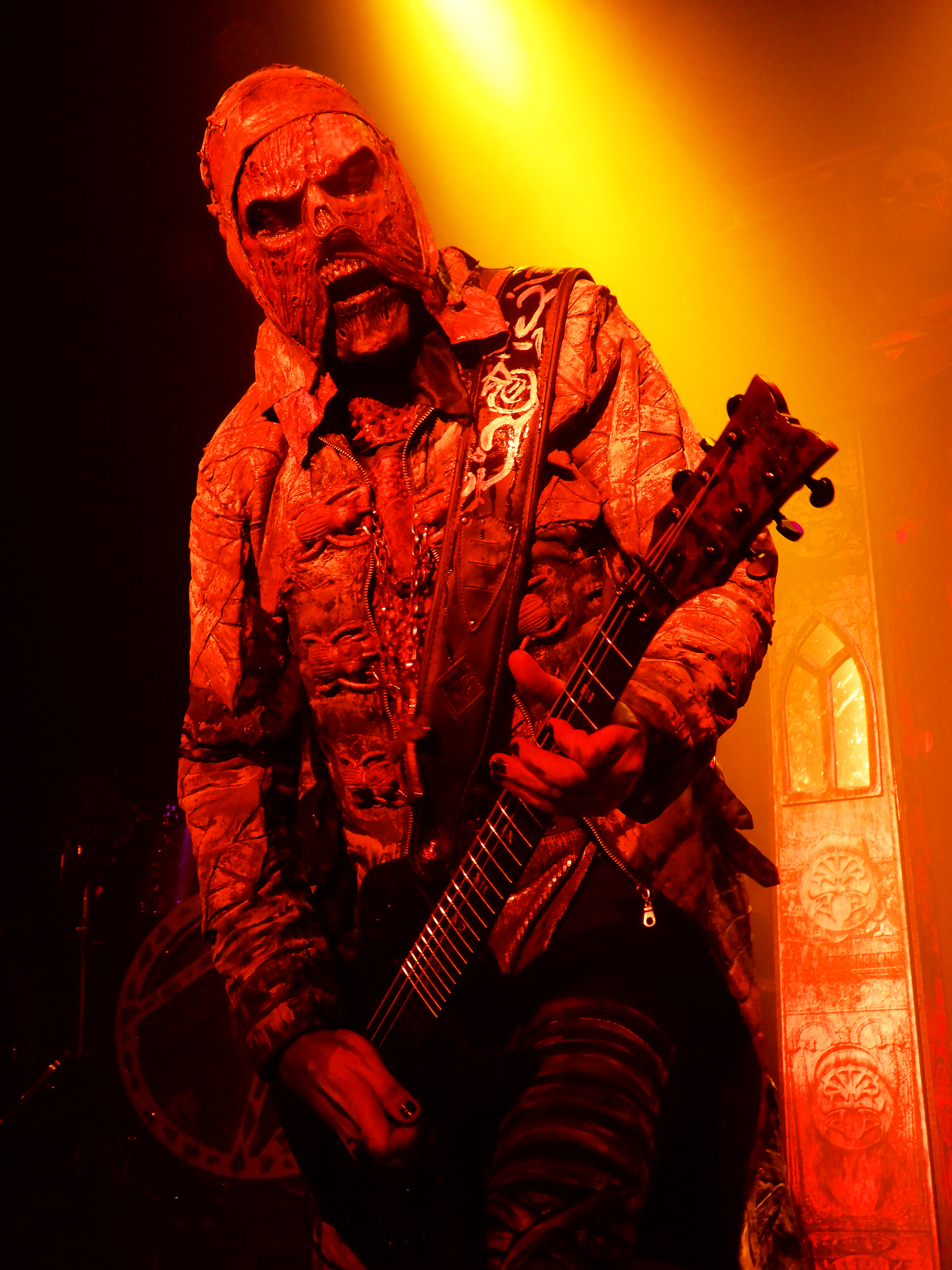
- Jussi Sydänmaa performing as Amen on stage in 2020

Background information
- Also known as: Amen
- Born: 26 June 1972 (age 53); Espoo, Finland
- Origin: Mäntsälä, Finland
- Occupation: Musician
- Instrument: Guitar
- Years active: 1997–2022
- Labels: Sony BMG
- Formerly of: Lordi
- Website: lordi.fi

Jussi Sydänmaa (born 26 June 1972) is a Finnish guitarist and a former founding member of the rock band Lordi, performing by the stage name of Amen until his departure in May 2022.

He graduated as an Information Technology engineer in 2001 and worked on Lordi's website. Sydänmaa plays Schechter guitars (specifically the Solo II Custom and the Hellraiser Solo II). The municipality of Mäntsälä granted Sydänmaa with a statue named "Hard Rock Stone" on 26 June 2006.

Sydänmaa has been featured as a special guest on Markus Striegls concert in 2011 and Doro Pesch's concert in 2014. He has also recorded guitar riffs which were used by Ari Pulkkinen to create the soundtrack for the video game Shadowgrounds. His acoustic guitar solos "Amen's Lament to Ra" and "Amen's Lament to Ra ll" were included on Lordi's albums Babez for Breakfast and Scare Force One.

== Biography ==
Jussi Sydänmaa was born on 26 June 1972 in Espoo, Finland, but spent his childhood and youth in Mäntsälä. He was interested in the guitar even before he began school. Sydänmaa's first contact with the band Kiss was in 1983 with the Lick It Up album. He was a passionate fan of Kiss, and he was bullied at school because of this.

At the age of 5, Sydänmaa got his first acoustic guitar and started guitar lessons. He enjoyed learning the instrument and how to play songs he liked, but he was too embarrassed to participate in his guitar play test. This experience shook young Sydänmaa, who gave up playing the guitar. Sydänmaa picked the guitar back up ten years later, when he began taking an interest in hard rock music.

As a young man, Sydänmaa played in various bands. The most promising was the Rag Flag, but they did not attain success. At the age of 25, Sydänmaa had come to the conclusion that the various rock-projects he participated in contributed to his failure. He went on to study newspaper and work in radio and later, commercial media communications. Sydänmaa completed a degree in 2001 in media technology engineering. After graduation, Sydänmaa did not go on to work in that field, as he had joined Lordi in the late 1990s under the stage name "Amen", and they had made their breakthrough in 2002. Because of Lordi's success, Sydänmaa decided to leave the IT engineering work to focus his career with Lordi.

In May 2022, he was asked to leave Lordi due to growing tensions between members in the band.

== Discography ==
=== Lordi ===
Studio albums

- Get Heavy (2002)
- The Monsterican Dream (2004)
- The Arockalypse (2006)
- Deadache (2008)
- Babez for Breakfast (2010)
- To Beast or Not to Beast (2013)
- Scare Force One (2014)
- Monstereophonic (Theaterror vs. Demonarchy) (2016)
- Sexorcism (2018)
- Killection (2020)
- Lordiversity (2021)

Live albums

- Market Square Massacre (2006)
- Bringing Back the Balls to Stockholm (2007)
- Recordead Live – Sextourcism in Z7 (2019)

Awards and achievements
Preceded by (Greece) Elena Paparizou with "My Number One"	Winner of the Eurovision Song Contest; 2006 (as part of Lordi)	Succeeded by (Serbia) Marija Šerifović with "Molitva"
Preceded by Geir Rönning with "Why?"	Finland in the Eurovision Song Contest; 2006 (as part of Lordi)	Succeeded by Hanna Pakarinen with "Leave Me Alone"
