= Sampsa Astala =

Finnish musician (born 1974)

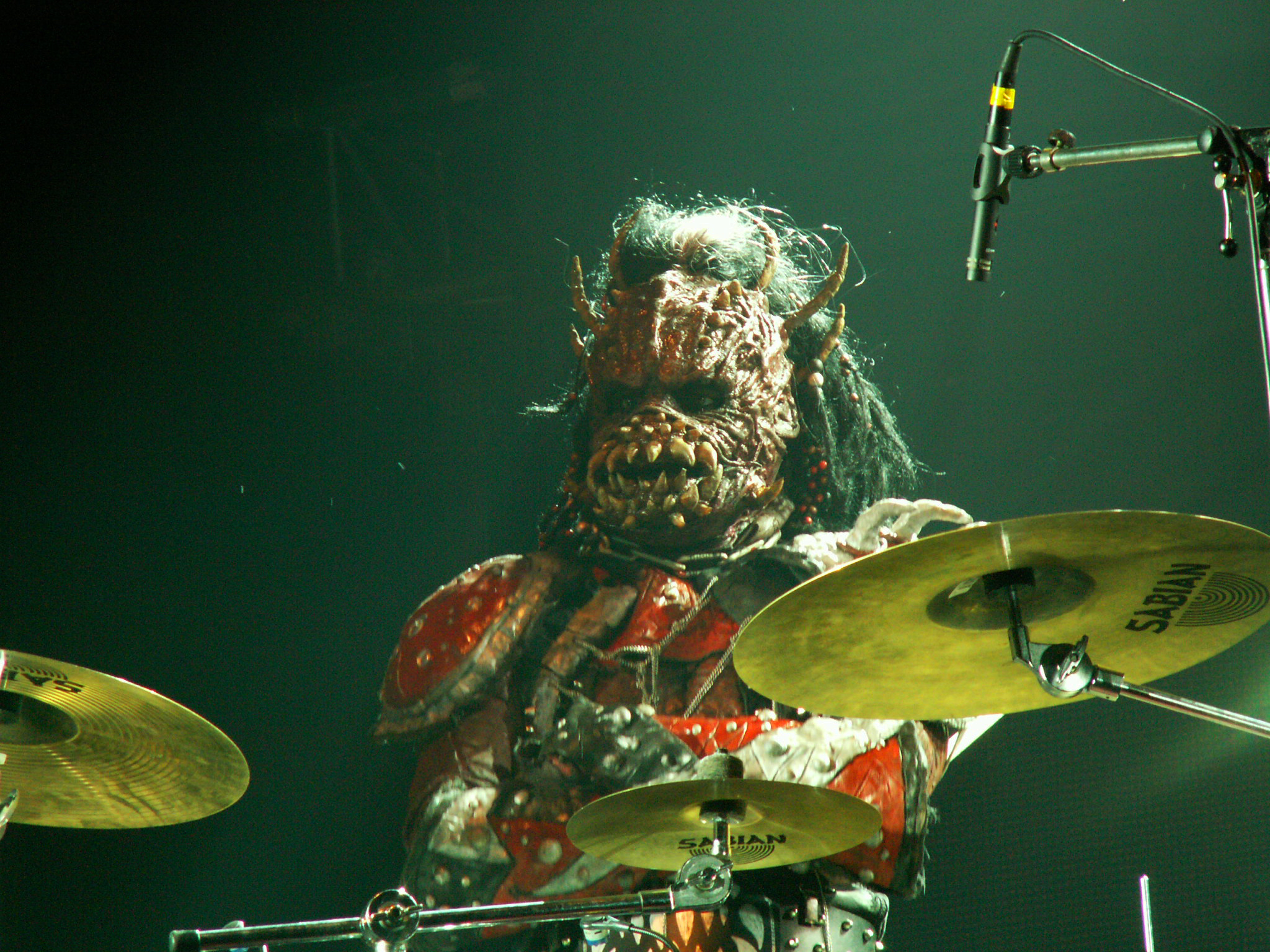
- Astala performing as 'Kita' with Lordi in 2006

Background information
- Also known as: Stala, Kita
- Born: 23 January 1974 (age 52); Vantaa, Finland
- Genres: Hard rock, heavy metal, glam rock
- Occupations: Musician, songwriter, producer
- Instruments: Drums, vocals
- Years active: 1997–present
- Labels: Sony BMG, So Music Finland Inc.
- Member of: Stala & SO.
- Formerly of: Lordi
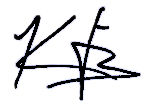
- Website: stalaso.com

Sampsa Astala (born 23 January 1974), known by stage names Stala and Kita, is the lead singer of the Finnish glam rock band Stala & SO. and the former and original drummer for the rock band Lordi.

His current stage name, Stala, comes from his own surname, Astala. His other stage name, which he used during his time in Lordi and whenever appearing as drummer, Kita, comes from the Finnish word meaning "jaws", "gap", or "maw".

== Career ==
Sampsa Astala created Stala & SO. as SO, back in 1997. The band recorded a few albums and toured in Finland but Astala didn't have much time for Stala & SO anymore since he joined Lordi in 2000 as drummer. He arranged and performed all backing vocals on the Lordi albums, but could not sing live due to his massive mask. With the band Lordi he went on to win the 2006 Eurovision Song Contest. In recognition, the city of Karkkila, where he spent his teenage years, named its youth facilities after him. Despite many critics wrongly accusing Lordi of being a satanic band, on the "Thank you to..." list on the Lordi albums, Kita thanks "Almighty God".

On 4 October 2010 there was an announcement from Lordi, saying that Kita no longer was a member. Further explanation told that his leaving was a joint decision between him and his bandmates, as Kita's increasing exposure as himself with Stala & So., rather than in costume as Kita, was "breaking the rules" of Lordi.

In end of 2010 it was announced that Stala & SO. would participate in the Finnish national selection, Euroviisut 2011, competing for the opportunity to go to Eurovision Song Contest 2011. On 23 November, the first promo single of the new album was released, "Everything For Money". On 29 November, "Pamela", the song with which he would play in Eurovision stage was revealed through the YLE channel. On 28 January, they passed the semi-final and they got "the card" for the final on 12 February. On 16 February their debut album, "It Is So.", was released.

== Discography ==
Studio albums:

- Se ihan kiva jäbä (2022)

=== Stala & SO. ===
- It Is So. (2011)
- Gimme Five (2012)
- Play Another Round (2013)
- Stala & So. (2015)

=== Lordi ===
- Get Heavy (2002)
- The Monsterican Dream (2004)
- The Arockalypse (2006)
- Deadache (2008)
- Babez for Breakfast (2010)

=== Other releases ===
- Apulanta: Hiekka (2002) (backing vocals)
- Järjestyshäiriö: Levoton (EP) (2004) (producer, recorder, backing vocals)
- Hanna Pakarinen: Lovers (2007) (backing vocals)
- Pete Parkkonen : First Album (2009) (song writing)
- Naked Idol: Boys of Summer (2013) (drums)
- Naked Idol: Shattered (2013) (drums)
- Naked Idol: Filthy Fairies EP (2013) (drums on "Shattered" and "Filthy Fairies")

Awards and achievements
| Preceded by (Greece) Helena Paparizou with "My Number One" | Winner of the Eurovision Song Contest; 2006 (as part of Lordi) | Succeeded by (Serbia) Marija Šerifović with "Molitva" |
| Preceded by Geir Rönning with "Why?" | Finland in the Eurovision Song Contest; 2006 (as part of Lordi) | Succeeded by Hanna Pakarinen with "Leave Me Alone" |
