= Polar Research and Policy Initiative =

Foreign policy think tank based in London

- Abbreviation: PRPI
- Formation: 2016
- Legal status: Independent, international think-tank incorporated in England and Wales
- Purpose: Promote UK and international engagement with the Arctic and the Antarctic
- Location: London, England
- Region served: United Kingdom Commonwealth of Nations United States European Union Greenland Faroe Islands Denmark Iceland Norway Sweden Finland Russia Antarctica
- Director: Dr Dwayne Ryan Menezes
- Staff: 35
- Website: www.polarconnection.org

The Polar Research and Policy Initiative (PRPI), also known as The Polar Connection, is a foreign policy think tank based in London, England. Specializing in the Arctic, Nordic, Baltic, and Antarctic regions, as well as energy and environmental issues, PRPI aims to promote sustainable regional development.

== History ==
=== Founding ===
Polar Research and Policy Initiative was founded by Dwayne Ryan Menezes and Christophe Milhères in 2015-2016 as the UK's first policy think-tank dedicated primarily to the Arctic and Antarctic. It was incorporated in England and Wales in September 2015, six months after the founders returned from Greenland, and launched in February 2016, at a private reception held at the Travellers Club in London. The event heard from Aleqa Hammond, the former Prime Minister of Greenland and Andrew Rosindell, Member of Parliament (MP) for Romford and Founder and former Chair of the All-Party Parliamentary Group on Polar Regions, as speakers, and attendees included Kamalesh Sharma, Commonwealth Secretary-General; Captain Ashok Mahapatra, Director of the Maritime Safety Division of the International Maritime Organization; Stefan Asmundssen, President of the North East Atlantic Fisheries Commission; Donald Lamont, Chairman of the UK Antarctic Heritage Trust, former Governor of the Falkland Islands and Commissioner of South Georgia and the South Sandwich Islands; and Jock Wishart, polar explorer. Its web portal, Polar Connection, was launched thereafter in July 2016.

=== Current status ===
The mission of PRPI, as stated on its website, is to:

- Raise the profile and understanding of the Polar Regions in the UK and across the Commonwealth;
- Support polar researchers and polar research institutions in maximising the visibility, impact, and reach of their research;
- Increase and sustain the scholarly, cultural, political, and commercial engagement of the UK and relevant Commonwealth member states with the Polar Regions (especially the Arctic Council member states);
- Help address the political, social, economic, and environmental challenges facing polar people and places;
- Facilitate greater bilateral trade and investment between Arctic states and Commonwealth member states.

PRPI's focus has gradually expanded from an early emphasis on UK and Commonwealth of Nations. This expansion includes the United States and, after the 2016 United Kingdom European Union membership referendum (popularly known as Brexit), the rest of Europe. As a UK-based international think-tank that operates principally in the international arena, at the time of its inception, PRPI engaged with different geographic constituencies through four engagement forums. These engagement forums include Asia Pacific, European Union, Small Island Developing States and World Ocean. Following the 2016 Arctic Circle Assembly, PRPI also introduced a new BRICS engagement forum.

== Activities ==
Since its inception, PRPI's most prominent features have been the provision of research, analysis and commentary; high engagement with policymakers, industry leaders, academics and Indigenous representatives; ongoing dialogue with national governments and multilateral fora; and active participation at national and international conferences. It has also aligned its principal activities with the key priorities of the incumbent Chairs of the Arctic Council: the United States, 2015–2017, on "improving economic and living conditions in Arctic communities"; and Finland, 2017–2019, in "the Agenda 2030 framework [2030 Agenda for Sustainable Development] can be used in Arctic cooperation for the benefit of humans and nature".

=== Research, analysis and commentary ===
PRPI publishes its research and provides analysis and commentary both, via its digital platform, Polar Connection and through partner platforms. PRPI Fellows also publish their research. Its research interests are reflected in its organizational structure, which features three divisions: theme-specific units; industry-specific units; and stakeholder engagement forums.

==== Theme-specific units ====
PRPI has six theme-specific units:

- Natural Environment
- Marine Environment
- Built Environment
- Indigenous Peoples
- Arts, Culture and Heritage
- Geopolitics and Security

==== Industry-specific units ====
PRPI has six industry-specific units:

- Energy
- Mining
- Shipping
- Fisheries
- Tourism
- Information and communications technology

==== Engagement forums ====
PRPI engages with different geopolitical constituencies through five engagement forums:

- Asia Pacific
- European Union
- Small Island Developing States
- World Ocean
- BRICS

=== Stakeholder engagement ===
PRPI positions itself as the nexus between stakeholders in policy, industry, academia, civil society and the media, and it provides a platform for dialogue and cooperation among different stakeholders. It does so in a variety of ways:

==== Parliamentary Evidence, Policy Briefs and Industry Briefs ====
PRPI has regularly provided written and oral evidence to relevant UK Parliamentary inquiries, such as:

- UK House of Commons Business, Energy and Industrial Strategy Committee, 'Leaving the EU: Negotiating Priorities for Energy and Climate Change Policy Inquiry';
- UK House of Commons Scottish Affairs Committee, 'Scotland and the High North Inquiry';
- UK House of Commons Science and Technology Committee, 'Closing the STEM Skills Gap Inquiry';
- UK House of Commons International Trade Committee, 'UK Trade Options Beyond 2019 Inquiry'.

PRPI also provides policy briefs and industry briefs, when requested, to policymakers and industry leaders.

==== Missions and delegations ====
PRPI also briefs national governments and intergovernmental bodies about various Arctic, Nordic, and Antarctic issues. In September 2016, its founder, Dwayne Menezes, represented PRPI at the United Nations General Assembly and was invited to attend the UN Paris Climate Change Agreement Ratification Ceremony in New York City as a Civil Society Observer. In its early years, PRPI delegations were also received by the Executive Secretary of the Antarctic Treaty Secretariat in Buenos Aires; the Executive Office of the Secretary-General of the United Nations at the Headquarters of the United Nations in New York; the Office of Science and Technology Policy at the White House, the United States Department of State, the International Monetary Fund and the National Science Foundation in Washington, D.C.; the Foreign and Commonwealth Office in London; the Department of Foreign Affairs and Trade (Australia) in Canberra; Global Affairs Canada, Senate of Canada and Government of Newfoundland and Labrador; the Prime Minister's Office (Finland) and Ministry for Foreign Affairs (Finland) in Helsinki; the Ministry of Foreign Affairs (Denmark) in Copenhagen; the Ministry of Foreign Affairs (Iceland) in Reykjavík; among others.

==== Conferences ====
PRPI has sent delegations to, or convened policy dialogues at the Arctic Circle Assemblies organized by Arctic Circle (organization) in Reykjavík in October 2015, October 2016 and October 2017; the Arctic Circle Forums hosted by the same organization in Edinburgh in November 2017 and Tórshavn in May 2018; the Arctic Encounter Symposia held in the margins of the 2015 United Nations Climate Change Conference in Paris in December 2015 and in Seattle in April 2018; the Arctic Spirit Conference hosted in Rovaniemi in November 2017; the Ramboll Arctic Roundtable in Portland, Maine in December 2016; the NERC Arctic Science Conference convened in Sheffield in September 2015 and Antarctic Science Conference in Norfolk in July 2016; the Antarctica 100 Annual Meeting at the Royal Geographical Society in London in November 2015; the Arctic Future Symposium hosted by the International Polar Foundation in Brussels in November 2015; and the Arctic Science Summit Week and Arctic Observing Summit held in Fairbanks in April 2016 and Davos in June 2018.

==== High-level dialogues on SDGs in the Arctic ====
PRPI has been widely credited for ensuring the Sustainable Development Goals remain high on the policy agenda of Arctic Council member and observer governments, and for bringing about a re-articulation of the global Arctic discourse along the lines of the 17 Global Goals. It is particularly known for its high-level, multi-stakeholder dialogues on SDGs in the Arctic, which have been convened thus far at the Arctic Circle Assembly at Harpa (concert hall) in Reykjavík, Iceland in October 2017; Lapland University of Applied Sciences in Rovaniemi, Finland in November 2017; Trent University in Peterborough, Ontario, Canada, in December 2017; Australian Institute of International Affairs in Canberra, Australia, in January 2018; Palace of Westminster in London, United Kingdom in February 2018; Fletcher School of Law and Diplomacy at Tufts University in Boston, United States in March 2018; Arctic Encounter Symposium in Seattle, United States in April 2018; University of Tromsø in Tromsø, Norway in April 2018; Arctic Circle Forum in Tórshavn, Faroe Islands in May 2018; and Jawaharlal Nehru University in New Delhi, India in June 2018.

==== Dialogues on Arctic Border Governance ====
In June 2017, PRPI co-hosted a workshop on 'Regional Security in the North: Emerging Themes and Challenges' in Whitehorse, Yukon, Canada, in collaboration with Trent University, Yukon College, Royal Military College of Canada, St. Jerome's University, the Consulate General of the United States in Toronto, Borders in Globalization and the Social Sciences and Humanities Research Council of Canada. At the workshop, David Johnny, former chief of the White River First Nation, highlighted the challenges posed by borders to indigenous communities, such as the Upper Tanana peoples, whose villages and dwellings were near the boundary or even straddled the line. Likewise, Dalee Sambo Dorough, professor at University of Alaska Anchorage and former chair of the United Nations Permanent Forum on Indigenous Issues, discussed the difficulties faced by American and Canadian Inuit.

Two months later, in August 2017, PRPI, along with University College London (UCL), Trent University and the Social Sciences and Humanities Research Council of Canada, convened a follow-up interdisciplinary panel discussion on 'Arctic Borders Governance' at UCL in London, with Heather Nicol, Ilan Kelman and Dwayne Menezes as speakers. The discussion focused on the implications of borders on indigenous peoples in Arctic and sub-Arctic regions - particularly the Inuit in United States, Canada, Greenland and Russia; the Aleuts in Russia and the United States; the Gwich'in people in Canada and the United States; and the Sami people in Norway, Sweden, Finland and Russia. These discussions also formed the basis of the paper on 'Canada, Indigenous Peoples and Northern Borders' that Menezes published in The Round Table: The Commonwealth Journal of International Affairs in October 2017.

In December 2017, on behalf of PRPI and Trent University, Menezes and Nicol chaired a panel discussion on Arctic borders at the Erasmus+ - and SSHRC- funded Borders in Globalization 2nd International Conference held at the Lord Elgin Hotel in Ottawa, Canada, with Canadian Senator Charlie Watt, historian P. Whitney Lackenbauer, lawyer Robin Campbell and Suzanne Lalonde, professor at Université de Montréal, as speakers.

==== Dialogues on Arctic Sealing ====
In October 2017, PRPI and the Embassy of Canada in Iceland hosted a screening of the 2016 Canadian feature-length documentary film Angry Inuk at the 2017 Arctic Circle Assembly in Reykjavík, Iceland, followed by a Q&A session with the Inuk filmmaker Alethea Arnaquq-Baril. Canada's Minister of Crown-Indigenous Relations and Northern Affairs Carolyn Bennett, Canadian Ambassador to Iceland Anne-Tamara Lorre and PRPI Director Dwayne Menezes offered addresses, while Penny Goodman of Scott Polar Research Institute moderated the discussion with Arnaquq-Baril. The film presented a defense of the Inuit seal hunt in the face of the EU Ban on Seal Products. The film also set the stage for a panel discussion on 'Arctic Sealing: Threat or Blue Prospect?' convened the next day by the North Atlantic Marine Mammal Commission (NAMMCO), World Wide Fund for Nature (WWF) and Nunavut Tunngavik Incorporated in which Arnaquq-Baril and Menezes both sat on the panel. The panel also included NAMMCO General Secretary Genevieve Desportes, Makivik Corporation Vice-president Adamie Alaku, Aaja Chemnitz and Nordic Council senior adviser Geir Oddsson, among others.

==== Dialogues on British, Canadian and American Arctic engagement ====
In April 2017, PRPI Director Menezes visited Rovaniemi, Finland, where he highlighted the opportunities for trade and investment between the UK and the eight Arctic Council member states at Northern STARS, the annual international seminar of Lapin AMK - Lapland University of Applied Sciences. In October 2017, PRPI hosted a discussion on the same topic at the 2017 Arctic Circle Assembly in Reykjavík, Iceland.

Likewise, early in July 2017, in order to mark the 150th anniversary of Canada, PRPI convened a special 'Canada 150' lecture and reception with Canadian historian Ken Coates of the Johnson Shoyama Graduate School of Public Policy, University of Saskatchewan, at the Institute of Commonwealth Studies, School of Advanced Study, University of London. Later that year, in October 2017, PRPI hosted two keynote lectures by Tony Penikett, former Premier of Yukon, on 'Indigenous Chiefs, Regional Legislators, and Nation States: Who Rules the Arctic?' in the UK, the first with University College London (UCL) in London and the second with the University of Edinburgh in Edinburgh. In November 2017, PRPI and the Department of Political Science at University of Western Ontario (UWO or Western University) convened two keynote lectures by Elizabeth Riddell Dixon in London, Ontario, Canada, the first on 'Ice Camps and Icebreakers: The Challenges of Mapping the Arctic Seabed' at London Public Library and the second on 'Sovereignty and Canada's Arctic Extended Continental Shelf' at UWO.

In January 2018, PRPI hosted a keynote lecture by American publisher and philanthropist Alice Rogoff on 'The US and its Emerging Arctic Interest' at UCL in London, United Kingdom.

==== Other dialogues ====
In 2016, PRPI Geopolitics and Security Fellow Barbora Padrtova was part of a research team that supported the preparation of an Arctic Analysis Research Report at the behest of the Ministry of Foreign Affairs (Czech Republic). She discussed her work in this regard at the 2016 General Conference of the European Consortium for Political Research held at Charles University in Prague in July 2016, the Annual Meeting of the Austrian Polar Research Institute in Vienna in November 2016 and an Expert Seminar on 'The Arctic: Emerging Importance of the Region for the Czech Republic' held at the Institute of International Relations Prague in Prague in January 2017.

In July 2017, PRPI convened a keynote lecture by PRPI Fisheries Fellow Brooks Kaiser on 'A Case for the Commons: The Snow Crab in the Barents' at Korea Polar Research Institute KOPRI in Incheon, South Korea. In September 2017, PRPI Fellow Nic Craig presented on the 'Implications of Brexit on UK - Arctic Interconnection and the Continued Need for Cooperation' at the 2017 Arctic Energy Summit in Helsinki, Finland.

In October 2017, PRPI joined University College London in hosting a keynote lecture by Timo Koivurova of Arctic Centre, University of Lapland on 'How Finland, as Chair of the Arctic Council, aims to improve Arctic Governance' at UCL in London, UK.
