= Weinblatt =

Weinblatt is a surname. Notable people with the surname include:

- Lee Weinblatt, American inventor
- Stuart Weinblatt, American rabbi
