= David Rubenstein =

American lawyer and businessman (born 1949)

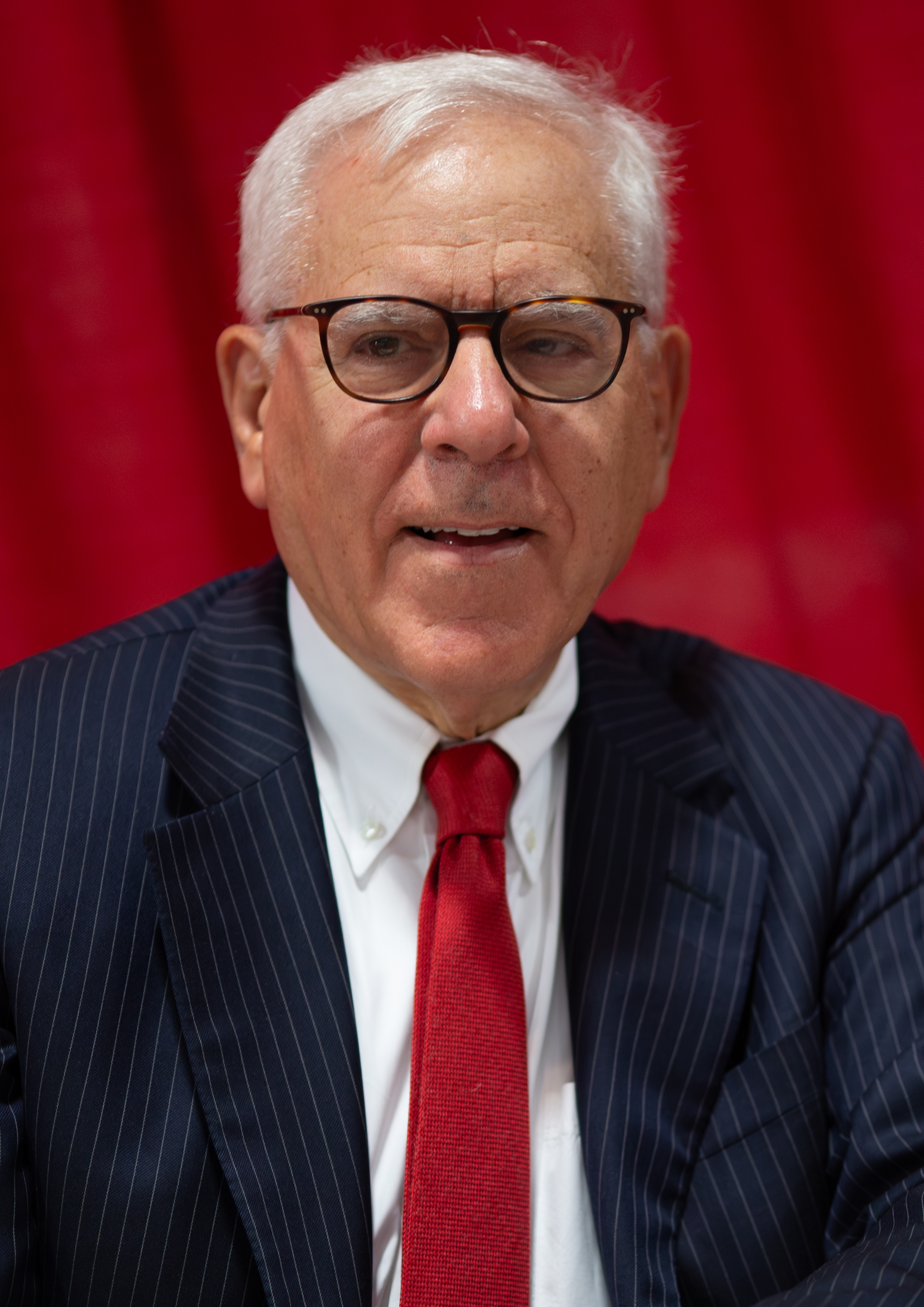
- Rubenstein in 2024
- Born: August 11, 1949 (age 77); Baltimore, Maryland, U.S.
- Education: Duke University (BA); University of Chicago (JD)
- Occupations: Lawyer; businessman
- Title: Co-founder and chairman, the Carlyle Group; President, Alfalfa Club; Owner, Baltimore Orioles
- Board member of: Smithsonian Institution; Council on Foreign Relations; Harvard Corporation; National Gallery of Art; University of Chicago; Memorial Sloan Kettering Cancer Center; Johns Hopkins Medicine; Lincoln Center for the Performing Arts; Institute for Advanced Study; Duke University; American Academy of Arts and Sciences
- Spouses: Alice Rogoff (m. 1983; div. 2017); Caryn Nathanson Zucker (m. 2026)
- Children: 3
- Awards: Presidential Medal of Freedom (2025)

Chairman of the Council on Foreign Relations
- Incumbent
- Assumed office July 1, 2017
- Preceded by: Carla Hills; Robert Rubin
- Website: www.davidrubenstein.com

David Mark Rubenstein (/ˈruːbɛnstaɪn/ ROO-ben-styne; born August 11, 1949) is an American billionaire businessman, philanthropist, and former government official. He is a co-founder and co-chairman of the Carlyle Group, a private equity firm based in Washington, D.C. Rubenstein is also the principal owner of Major League Baseball (MLB) team the Baltimore Orioles.

Rubenstein is the chairman of the National Gallery of Art, the Council on Foreign Relations, and the Economic Club of Washington, D.C. He is a former board of trustees chairman at Duke University and the Smithsonian Institution. He was co-chair of the board at the Brookings Institution. In 2022, he became chair of the University of Chicago's board of trustees. According to Forbes, Rubenstein had an estimated net worth of approximately $4.1 billion as of May 2026.

Rubenstein was the chairman of the Kennedy Center for the Performing Arts from 2010 until 2025, when he was replaced by president Donald Trump.

== Early life and education ==
Rubenstein grew up as an only child in a Jewish family in Baltimore. His father was a United States Postal Service file clerk, and his mother was a homemaker and then began working in a dress shop when he was six years old. He later recalled: "When I was young, Baltimore was a religiously segregated city. The Jews were in the northwest part of town, and it was very much a ghetto situation. I was 13 before I realized everyone in the world was not Jewish. Up to that point, everyone I knew was Jewish."

Rubenstein graduated from the college preparatory high school Baltimore City College in 1966, an all-male school at the time. He then attended Duke University, where he was elected to Phi Beta Kappa and graduated magna cum laude with a Bachelor of Arts in political science in 1970. He earned his J.D. from the University of Chicago Law School in 1973, where he was an editor of the University of Chicago Law Review along with future U.S. federal judges Douglas H. Ginsburg and Frank Easterbrook.

== Career ==
=== Early law career ===
From 1973 to 1975, Rubenstein practiced law in New York at Paul, Weiss, Rifkind, Wharton & Garrison. From 1975 to 1976, he served as chief counsel to the U.S. Senate Judiciary Committee's Subcommittee on Constitutional Amendments. Rubenstein also served as a deputy domestic policy advisor to President Jimmy Carter and worked in private practice with Shaw, Pittman, Potts & Trowbridge in Washington, D.C.

=== The Carlyle Group ===
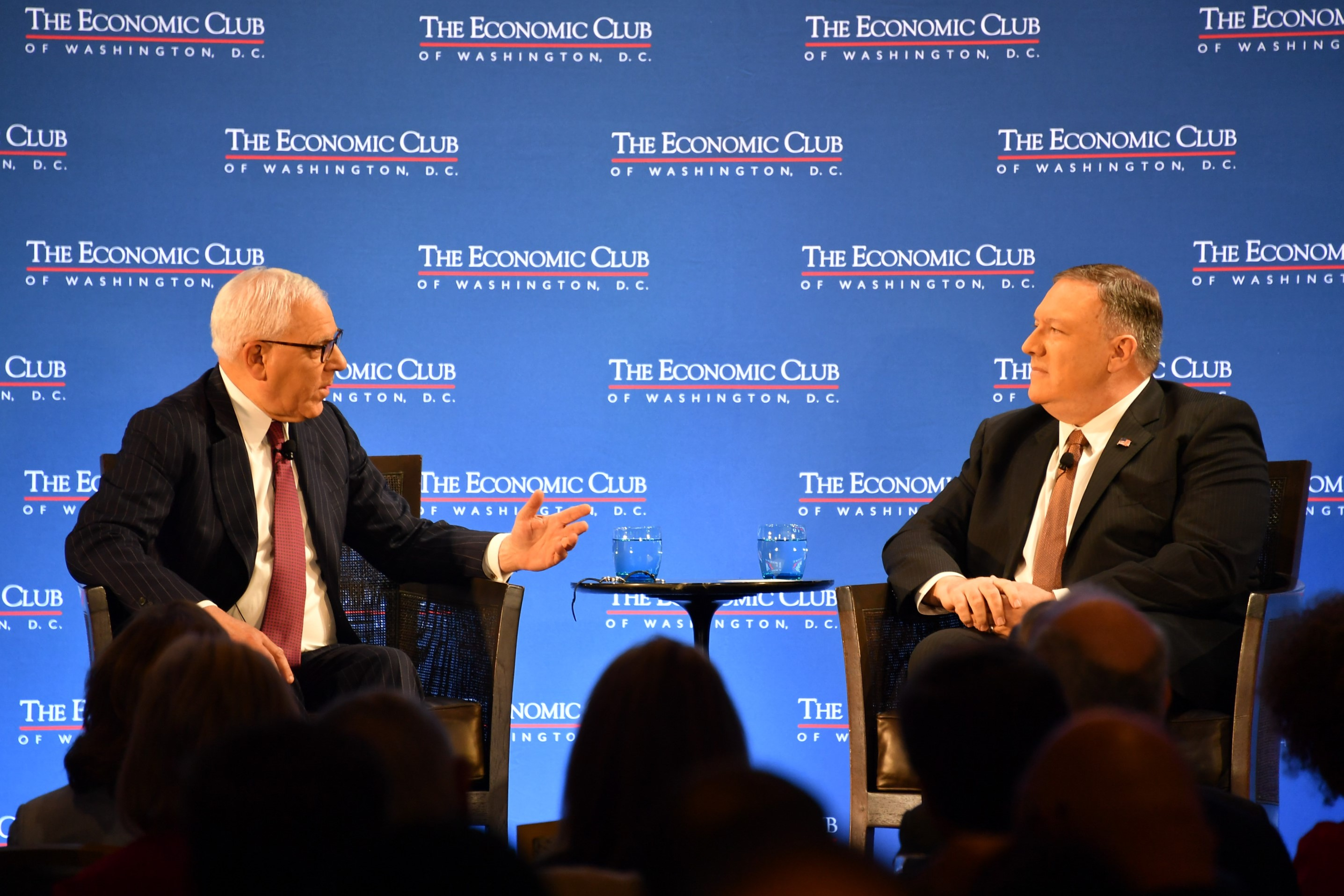
Rubenstein (left) speaks with US Secretary of State Mike Pompeo in 2019.

In 1987, Rubenstein founded the Carlyle Group with William E. Conway Jr. and Daniel A. D'Aniello. The firm has grown into a global investment firm with $477 billion in assets under management (AUM) as of December 31, 2025, and more than 1,800 employees in 31 offices on six continents.

Rubenstein was co-CEO of Carlyle until 2011, when he transitioned to the role of co-executive chairman, with Glenn Youngkin and Michael Cavanagh assuming co-CEO responsibilities.

In 2006, Rubenstein expressed fear that the private equity boom would end, saying, "This has been a golden age for our industry, but nothing continues to be golden forever." One month later, he said, "Right now we're operating as if the music's not going to stop playing and the music is going to stop. I am more concerned about this than any other issue". According to Phiwa Nkambule, "These concerns proved to be right, as at the end of 2007, the buyout market collapsed... As leveraged loan activity came to an abrupt stop, private equity firms were unable to secure financing for their transactions." However, Rubenstein's outlook quickly rebounded, and in 2008, he said, "But once this period is over, once the debt on the books of the banks is sold and new lending starts, I think you'll see the private equity industry coming back in what I call the Platinum Age – better than it's ever been before. I do think that the private equity industry has a great future and that the greatest period for private equity is probably ahead of us." Reflecting on this period in 2018, Rubenstein argued that "actually most of the deals done in the heyday of the Great Recession pretty much worked out," and that the private equity industry had been "strengthened so much that now it’s the greatest time we’ve ever had to raise money."

In May 2012, Carlyle completed its initial public offering on the Nasdaq, raising approximately $671 million and valuing the firm at $6.7 billion – one of the most anticipated private equity IPOs in years.

Rubenstein has said that he was once offered the opportunity to meet Mark Zuckerberg and invest in Facebook before Zuckerberg dropped out of Harvard University but decided against it, and that this is his single greatest investment regret. Rubenstein also said that he turned down a 20% stake in Amazon during the very early years of the company. He told Amazon founder Jeff Bezos that if he got lucky and everything worked out he would at most be worth $300 million.

In 2017, he formed Declaration Capital, a family office focused on venture, growth, real estate, and family-owned businesses. The family office subsequently seeded Declaration Partners, an external investment firm that manages approximately $2.2 billion in assets across private equity, real estate, and opportunistic strategies on behalf of global family offices and institutional investors.

In 2017, Rubenstein became chairman of the Council on Foreign Relations, one of the most prominent foreign policy organizations in the United States, succeeding Carla Hills and Robert Rubin who had been co-chairs.

=== Books ===
In October 2019, Rubenstein's first book was published. Called The American Story: Interviews with Master Historians (Simon & Schuster), the book features interviews with historians talking about their areas of historical expertise. Among others, Rubenstein interviews David McCullough on John Adams, Jon Meacham on Thomas Jefferson, Ron Chernow on Alexander Hamilton, and Walter Isaacson on Benjamin Franklin.

His second book, How to Lead, was published by Simon & Schuster in September 2020. This book contains Rubenstein's reflections on leadership as well as 30 interviews with business, government, military, sports and cultural leaders. In September 2021, Simon & Schuster published Rubenstein's third book, The American Experiment, which describes how America's government and democratic ideals have evolved over the centuries as told through the lives of Americans who have embodied the American dream.

In September 2022, he published his fourth book under Simon & Schuster, How to Invest, where he shares insights from interviews with investors.

In September 2024, he published his fifth book, The Highest Calling: Conversations on the Presidency (Simon & Schuster). The book features interviews with historians talking about US Presidents. Among others, Rubenstein interviews Douglas Bradburn on George Washington, Ron Chernow on Ulysses S. Grant, Candice Millard on James Garfield, Susan Eisenhower on Dwight D. Eisenhower and Kai Bird on Jimmy Carter.

=== Television show and podcast host ===
Rubenstein hosts two shows on Bloomberg Television: The David Rubenstein Show: Peer to Peer Conversations and Bloomberg Wealth with David Rubenstein. Peer to Peer, which began airing in October 2016, also airs on many PBS stations and is available on Curiosity Stream.

He also hosts History with David Rubenstein on PBS, a TV show produced by the New-York Historical Society. Rubenstein also hosts the audio podcast "For the Ages", also produced by the New-York Historical Society.

=== Baltimore Orioles ===
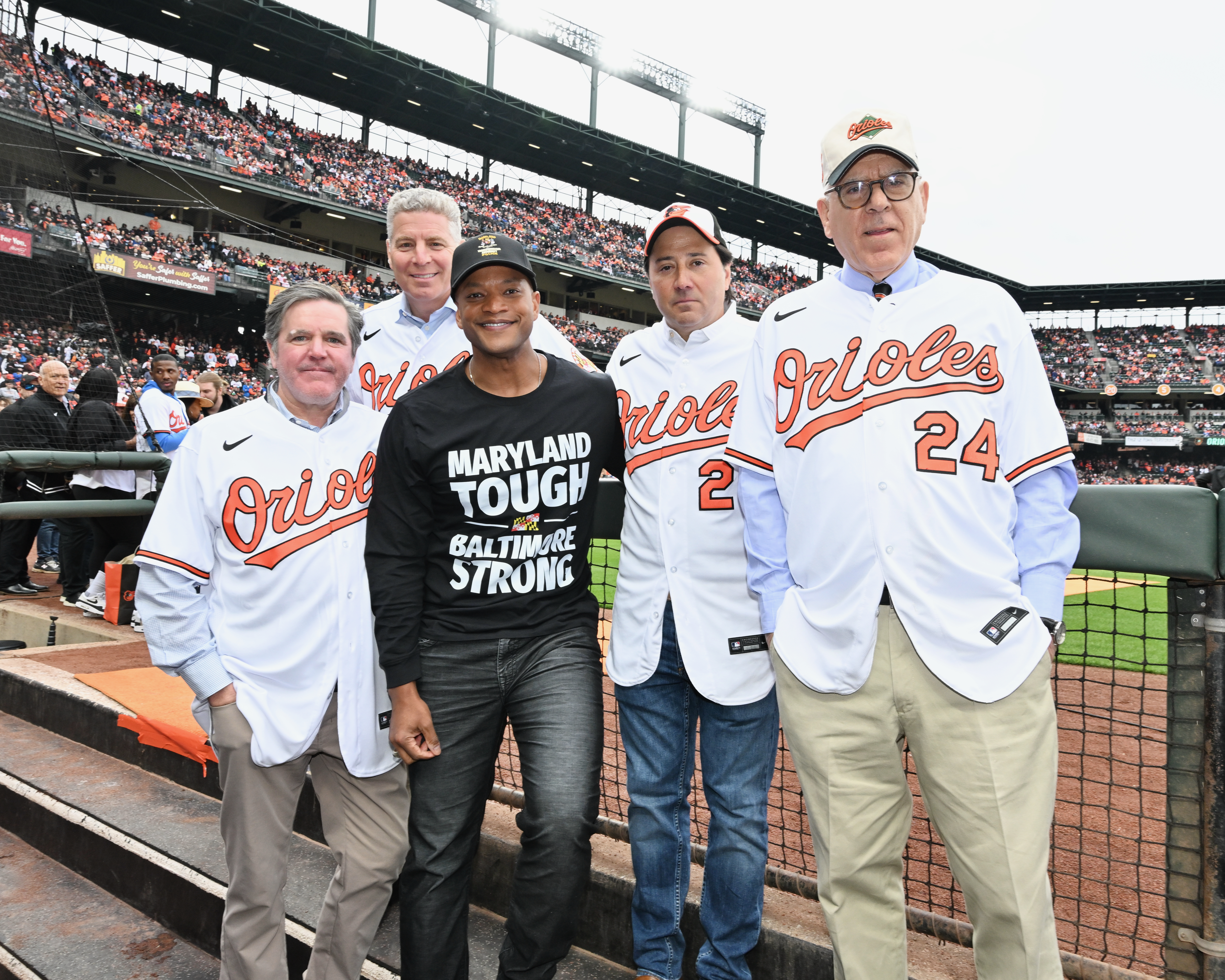
Rubenstein (right) and other members of the Orioles ownership group with Maryland governor Wes Moore, 2024

In March 2024, Rubenstein completed the purchase of the Baltimore Orioles from Peter Angelos and the Angelos family for $1.725 billion, becoming the team's chairman, CEO, and principal owner. A Baltimore native, Rubenstein had been a lifelong Orioles fan.

The ownership group included Ares Management co-founder Mike Arougheti, former Baltimore mayor Kurt Schmoke, former New York mayor Michael Bloomberg, and Hall of Fame athletes Cal Ripken Jr. and Grant Hill. Rubenstein stated his goal was to bring a World Series championship back to Baltimore, and in his first offseason as owner increased the team's payroll by $50 million.

As of mid-2026, CNBC estimated the franchise's value at $2 billion.

== Personal life ==
Rubenstein lives in Bethesda, Maryland, and was married to Alice Rogoff, founder of the Alaska House New York and the Alaska Native Arts Foundation and former owner of Alaska Dispatch News. They met while both were working for the Carter administration and married on May 21, 1983. The couple divorced on December 8, 2017.

Rubenstein and Rogoff had three children together, two daughters and a son. Gabrielle "Ellie" Rubenstein co-founded Manna Tree, a private equity firm that invests in health and nutrition companies; she was also one of two dozen honorary co-chairs of the Alaskan chapter of Donald Trump's 2016 presidential campaign.

U.S. Chief Justice John Roberts officiated at Rubenstein's marriage to Caryn Zucker in June 2026. Stuart Weinblatt, rabbi emeritus at B'nai Tzedek in Potomac, Maryland, officiated at the religious ceremony.

== Philanthropy ==
Rubenstein was among the initial 40 individuals who have pledged to donate more than half of their wealth to philanthropic causes or charities as part of The Giving Pledge. Rubenstein is well known for his "patriotic philanthropy" focused on preservation of American history and historic sites.

=== Historic document preservation ===
In December 2007, Rubenstein purchased the last privately owned copy of Magna Carta at Sotheby's auction house in New York for $21.3 million. He has lent it to the National Archives in Washington, D.C. In 2011, he gave $13.5 million to the National Archives for a new gallery and visitor center.

In 2013, Rubenstein purchased the July 6, 1776 edition of The Pennsylvania Evening Post, which was the first newspaper to print the U.S. Declaration of Independence, for $632,500, so it could be placed on public display. He loaned the copy, one of 19 known to exist, to the Newseum in 2016.

In 2012, Rubinstein purchased a copy of the Emancipation Proclamation, signed by Abraham Lincoln, for $2 million. It was one of 48 copies of the Proclamation to be signed by Lincoln, of which about half survive. Rubenstein donated $10 million to the National Museum of African American History and Culture and loaned the museum his copy of the Emancipation Proclamation as well as a rare copy of the Thirteenth Amendment, which was also signed by Lincoln. Rubenstein acquired the 1784 Abel Buell map at Christie's in 2011 and loaned it to the Library of Congress for display.

In November 2013, he bought a copy of the Bay Psalm Book, the first book printed in British North America, for $14.1 million. This was the highest price ever paid for a printed book. Rubenstein loaned the book to Duke University, where it was publicly displayed.

=== Performing arts ===
Rubenstein was vice chairman of the board of the Lincoln Center for the Performing Arts in New York, and chairman of its fundraising drive. A new atrium was named for him.

Rubenstein contributed $111 million to the John F. Kennedy Center for the Performing Arts, making him the largest individual contributor in the Kennedy Center's history. This includes a $50 million donation in 2013 to fund half of a 65,000 square-foot addition to the center. Rubenstein spent 14 years on the Kennedy Center board, to which he was appointed by President George W. Bush. He was appointed chairman of the board in 2010 and was subsequently reelected. He announced his intention to leave the board in January 2025, but agreed to remain chair until September 2026 pending a nationwide search for a successor. The Kennedy Center was overseen by President Donald Trump, who fired all 18 members of the board of trustees appointed by President Joe Biden. Trump also removed Rubenstein as chair of board and installed himself as chairman of the Kennedy Center. Rubenstein declined to comment publicly but subsequently thanked the Kennedy Center staff for their work during his tenure.

=== Smithsonian Institution ===
In 2009, Rubenstein began a six-year term as a citizen member of the board of regents of the Smithsonian Institution. He was reappointed in 2015, and in 2021 was named chairman of the board of regents. His term expired in 2021.

Between 2011 and 2024, Rubenstein has donated a total of $22 million to support the National Zoo and Smithsonian Conservation Biology Institute's giant panda conservation program. (Note: This includes gifts made in 2011, 2015, and 2024.) He also donated $2 million in 2013 in support of the Zoo's Asian elephant research program.

He also donated $10 million to the National Gallery of Art (NGA) in support of refurbishment and expansion of the East Building; the project was completed in September 2016. Rubenstein contributed $10 million in 2021 to support the NGA's digital and other operations. In 2021, he was named chairman of the NGA's board of trustees, replacing Sharon Rockefeller, who retired. Rubenstein donated $5 million to the National Air and Space Museum to support an exhibit on the Wright brothers and the early history of aviation.

=== American historic sites and national monuments ===
He donated $10 million to the White House Historical Association in 2011.

In 2013, he donated $10 million to the Mount Vernon Ladies' Association for the construction of a building to house the Fred W. Smith National Library for the Study of George Washington at Mount Vernon, and to endow a fund for rare books and manuscripts.

In 2015, Rubenstein donated $5.37 million to the National Park Foundation to fund the restoration of the Marine Corps War Memorial in Arlington, Virginia.

In 2013 and 2015, he donated a total of $20 million to the Thomas Jefferson Foundation, which was used to rebuild at least two buildings in the enslaved community on Mulberry Row at Monticello, Jefferson's home. The funds were also used to restore Jefferson's original road scheme, restore Monticello's second and third stories, which were mostly empty, and replace infrastructure.

In 2014, Rubenstein donated $10 million to Montpelier, James Madison's plantation house, to support its renovation.

In 2014, Rubenstein donated $12 million towards the refurbishment of Arlington House at Arlington National Cemetery. The work was completed in 2021. He supported legislation to remove Robert E. Lee's name from the building (which is formally known as “Arlington House, The Robert E. Lee Memorial").

In 2012, Rubenstein donated $7.5 million towards the repair of the Washington Monument, which had been damaged in an earthquake the previous year; he later donated another $3 million to refurbish the Monument’s elevator.

On Presidents' Day 2016, Rubenstein presented a gift of $18.5 million to the National Park Foundation to expand educational resources, foster public access, and repair and restore the Lincoln Memorial on the National Mall in Washington, D.C. The Park Service plans to create 15,000 square feet of visitor space in the undercroft of the memorial. This gift, presented during National Park Service's centennial year, was Rubenstein's fourth gift to benefit US national parks.

In 2019, Rubenstein donated $10 million for upgrades to the Thomas Jefferson Memorial in Washington, D.C.; the gift funded a new and expanded museum within the memorial, accessibility improvement, and expanded exhibit space. Work began in December 2021 and is expected to be complete in the spring of 2025.

In 2020, he donated $10 million to the Library of Congress for the refurbishment of its Jefferson Building. He also is the chair of the National Book Festival.

In 2024, Rubenstein contributed $1.5 million to an expansion and modernization of the Jewish Museum of Maryland.

=== Universities and healthcare ===
In November 2015, he donated $20 million for the New Commons Building at the Institute for Advanced Study in Princeton NJ. The building will be named Rubenstein Commons and will feature conference space, meeting rooms, a cafe, and office space.

==== Duke University ====
Rubenstein has donated over $100 million to Duke University and was chair of its board of trustees from 2013 to 2017. Rubenstein's first large gift to Duke was in 2002, when he donated $5 million to Duke's Sanford School of Public Policy in 2002; that gift led to the naming of Rubenstein Hall. In 2009, he donated an additional $5.75 million to support Duke's public policy program. In 2011, he donated $13.6 million to the Duke University Libraries in support of renovating the university's special collections library, which was named the David M. Rubenstein Rare Book & Manuscript Library. In 2012, he donated $15 million to support the university's Innovation and Entrepreneurship Initiative and $10 million to support Duke Athletics. In 2013, Rubenstein donated $10 million to fund graduate fellowships and undergraduate internships at the Sanford School of Public Policy. In 2014, Rubenstein donated $1.9 million to Jewish Life at Duke to expand programming, fund building renovations and enhance the college experience for Jewish students. In 2015, Rubenstein gave $25 million towards the construction of a new 71,000-square foot Arts Center. In 2017, he donated $20 million to endow scholarships for first-generation, low-income students.

==== University of Chicago ====
Rubenstein was elected to the board of trustees of the University of Chicago on May 31, 2007. He became chair of the Board in 2022.

In 2010, Rubenstein established the Rubenstein Scholars Program at the University of Chicago Law School; over time, he has contributed $76 million to it. The program provides full-tuition scholarships and stipends to Rubenstein Scholars, who make up about 10 percent of the university's law students.

In 2014, he provided the lead funding for a forum to be the university's principal conference center.

In March 2026, Rubenstein donated $50 million for the modernization of Ida Noyes Hall, a campus building, renaming it the David M. Rubenstein Commons.

==== Harvard University ====
Rubenstein has donated $60 million to the Harvard Kennedy School to facilitate its fellowship program and to help build its new campus. He chairs the Harvard Global Advisory Council. Rubenstein was a Fellow of the Harvard Corporation, the governing body of Harvard University, from 2017 to 2023.

==== Johns Hopkins University ====
In October 2015, Rubenstein donated $15 million to the Department of Otolaryngology-Head and Neck Surgery at the Johns Hopkins University School of Medicine to create a new hearing center focused on restoring functional hearing loss. In January 2021, he donated an additional $15 million to the same department to support development of therapeutic approaches to preserve and restore hearing. He is also an Emeritus Trustee of the Johns Hopkins University Board of Trustees.

==== Cancer research ====
In 2016, he donated $25 million for a pancreatic cancer center at Memorial Sloan Kettering Cancer Center.

=== PBS ===
Rubenstein has donated $10 million to PBS to help fund Ken Burns documentaries and $5 million to the PBS affiliate in Washington, WETA, to help fund a new headquarters.

=== United States Holocaust Memorial Museum ===
In May 2022, Rubenstein announced a $15 million donation to the United States Holocaust Memorial Museum to support and expand the growth of its collection. The gift aided in the museum exceeding its $1 billion fundraising goal a year early, and as a result, the museum’s collection previously known as the National Institute for Holocaust Documentation was renamed the David M. Rubenstein National Institute for Holocaust Documentation in his honor.

== Honors and recognition ==
- 2006, Golden Plate Award of the American Academy of Achievement presented by Awards Council member Eli Broad during the International Achievement Summit in Los Angeles
- 2011, National Archives Foundation’s Records of Achievement Award, for his loan of the 1297 Magna Carta as well as a rare Stone engraving of the Declaration of Independence to the National Archives for public display
- 2014, elected to the American Academy of Arts and Sciences
- 2015, Carnegie Medal of Philanthropy
- 2017, LBJ Foundation’s Liberty & Justice for All Award
- 2018, Legend in Leadership Award of Yale SOM’s Chief Executive Leadership Institute
- 2018, ABANA Achievement Award
- 2018, honorary degree, Dartmouth College
- 2019, Duke’s University Medal, the school’s highest honor
- 2019, The Harvard Club of Washington, D.C.'s Public Service Award
- 2019, honorary degree, Brown University
- 2019, elected to the American Philosophical Society
- 2025, awarded the Presidential Medal of Freedom by President Joe Biden

== Affiliations ==
- Alfalfa Club, President
- American Academy of Arts & Sciences, board member
- Bloomberg Television – Peer to Peer Conversations — The David Rubenstein Show
- Brookings Institution – former Co-Chairman, Chairman Emeritus
- The Carlyle Group – co-founder and Co-Chairman
- University of Chicago – Trustee, alumnus
- China–United States Exchange Foundation – Steering committee member
- Council on Foreign Relations – Chairman
- Dwight D. Opperman Foundation – Chairman, The Justice Ruth Bader Ginsburg Woman of Leadership Award
- The Economic Club of Washington D.C. – Chairman
- Harvard Corporation – member
- Harvard Global Advisory Council – Chairman
- Harvard University – Harvard President Drew Faust named David Rubenstein a Fellow of Harvard College on May 25, 2016, the evening before their 2016 Commencement. He started his term in July 2017.
- Institute for Advanced Study – Trustee
- Johns Hopkins Medicine – Trustee
- Kennedy Center for the Performing Arts – Chairman
- Library of Congress – Madison Council (Chairman)
- Lincoln Center for the Performing Arts – Director, former Vice Chairman
- Memorial Sloan-Kettering Cancer Center – Trustee
- National Constitution Center – Director
- National Gallery of Art – Chairman
- National Park Foundation – major donor
- Smithsonian Institution – former Chairman
- Tsinghua University – former Chairman of the School of Economics and Management
- World Economic Forum – Board of Trustees member

== Books ==
- The American Story: Conversations with Master Historians. Simon & Schuster. 2019. ISBN 978-1-9821-2025-2.
- How to Lead: Wisdom from the World's Greatest CEOs, Founders, and Game Changers. Simon & Schuster. 2020. ISBN 978-1-9821-3215-6.
- How to Invest: Masters on the Craft. Simon & Schuster. 2022. ISBN 978-1-9821-9030-9.
- The Highest Calling: Conversations on the American Presidency. Simon & Schuster. 2024. ISBN 978-1-6680-6762-8.
- Abraham Lincoln: His Life in Print. The Grolier Club. 2024. ISBN 978-1-6058-3118-3.
- The American Experiment: Dialogues on a Dream. Simon & Schuster. 2026. ISBN 978-1-9821-6582-6.
- Inside the Owner's Box: Conversations on Power and Leadership in Sports. Simon & Schuster. 2026. ISBN 978-1-6680-2249-8.
- Speaking of America: Great Conversations at the Library of Congress. Duke University Press. 2026. ISBN 978-1-4780-3464-3.
