= University of Lapland =

Public university in Rovaniemi, Finland

- Lapin yliopisto
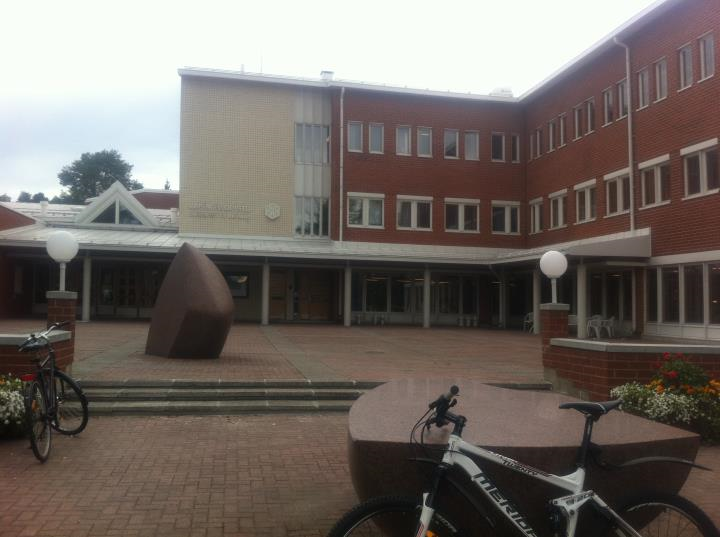
- Motto: For the North – For the World
- Type: Public
- Established: 1979; 47 years ago
- Affiliations: UArctic
- Rector: Antti Syväjärvi
- Administrative staff: 730
- Students: 4650
- Location: Rovaniemi, Finland
- Colors: Turquoise and grey
- Website: www.ulapland.fi
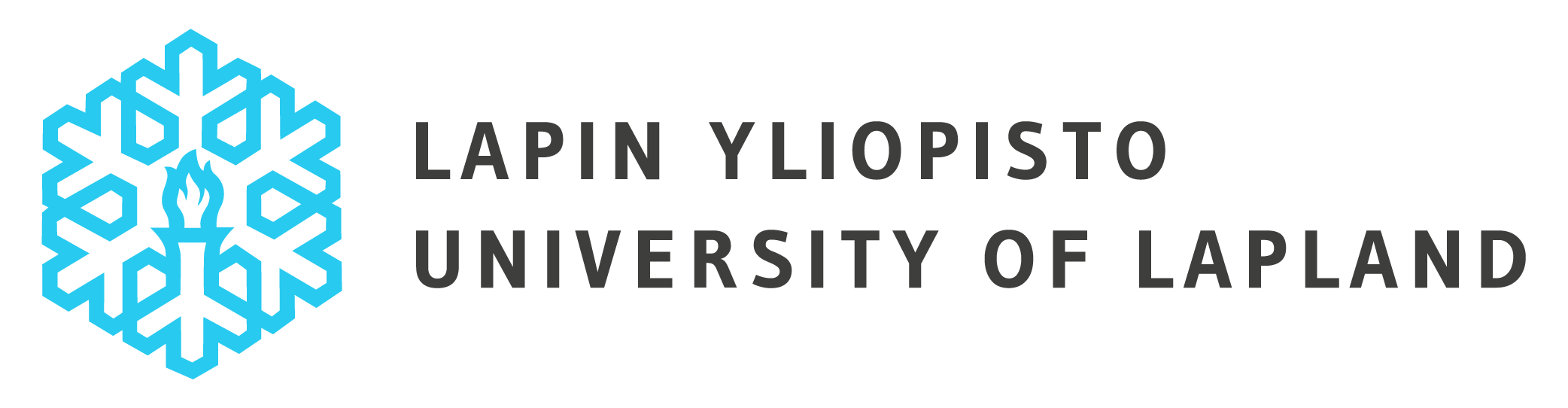

The University of Lapland (Finnish: Lapin yliopisto, Swedish: Lapplands universitet) is a public university in Rovaniemi, Finland. It was established in 1979 and is the northernmost university in the European Union.

Around 4,000 undergraduate students and 500 doctoral students study at the university. Most of the university's students come from southern part of Finland or from abroad. The university is ranked internationally at 2570th place.

The University of Lapland focuses on art and design, law, social sciences, and northern and Arctic issues. The university's strategic focus areas are Arctic global responsibility, sustainable tourism, and management of future services and distances. The university is a member of the international network University of the Arctic and hosts the organisation's international secretariat.

The university collaborates with universities and organisations around the world to promote research, education, and cultural exchange. The number of employees at Lapland University is 642, of which 46 are professors. Lapland University's budget for 2018 was approximately €50 million.

== Studies ==
The university has four faculties:

- Faculty of Art and Design
- Faculty of Education
- Faculty of Law
- Faculty of Social Sciences

Studies can be conducted on a bachelor's, master's, and doctorate level in Finnish, with opportunity for study in English at the master's and doctorate level. There are also study opportunities for Sámi culture and language.

== International collaboration ==
The University of Lapland is an active member of the University of the Arctic, hosting its international secretariat. UArctic is an international cooperative network based in the Circumpolar Arctic region, consisting of more than 200 universities, colleges, and other organizations with an interest in promoting education and research in the Arctic region.

The university also participates in UArctic's mobility program north2north. The aim of that program is to enable students of member institutions to study in different parts of the North.

== Research ==
The University of Lapland focuses its research on changes in the northern climate and other forms of arctic research such as responsible tourism and sustainability.

The university's faculty of law also studies the rights and issues of the Finnish minority group Sámi.

The strategic choices deal with

- global Arctic responsibility
- sustainable tourism
- future services and reachability

In addition to faculties, there is the Arctic Centre that conducts multidisciplinary research in changes in the Arctic region, and communicates Arctic issues via Arktikum Science Centre and science communications.

== Rectors ==
- Esko Riepula 1979–2006
- Mauri Ylä-Kotola 2006–2019
- Antti Syväjärvi 2019–

== Notable people ==
- Pigga Keskitalo (b. 1972), Sámi politician and academic
- Katri Kulmuni (b. 1987), politician, former Centre Party leader and Minister of Finance
- Liisa Rantalaiho (b. 1933), sociologist

== See also ==
- List of universities in Finland
