= Alaska Dispatch =

News organisation

- Type: Online newspaper
- Owner(s): Alice Rogoff; Tony Hopfinger
- Founded: 2008; 18 years ago
- Ceased publication: 2014
- Headquarters: 2301 Merrill Field Drive; Anchorage, Alaska
- Website: adn.com

Alaska Dispatch was a news organization founded in 2008 and based in Anchorage, Alaska. It was originally an online news outlet focusing on statewide coverage of the U.S. state of Alaska, and on circumpolar affairs and policy.

In 2014, the organization purchased the Anchorage Daily News from McClatchy Newspapers, merging the two news operations under the masthead Alaska Dispatch News. In 2017, the combined news organization declared bankruptcy and was sold to Binkley Group; the newspaper reverted to its previous name.

== History ==
Alaska Dispatch began as an Alaska news blog in 2008, started by former Bloomberg and Newsweek correspondent Tony Hopfinger and his then-wife, journalist Amanda Coyne, who wrote articles and blogs for Alaska Dispatch until late 2012. In 2009, Alice Rogoff, former U.S. News & World Report chief financial officer and wife of Carlyle Group co-founder David Rubenstein, bought a majority share in the website, and the organization moved into a hangar located along Anchorage's Merrill Field Airport, where Rogoff, a licensed pilot, also houses her Cessna 206. With Rogoff's investment, the staff grew to include journalists who had previously worked for other Alaska news outlets, including the Fairbanks Daily News-Miner, the Anchorage Press, local NBC affiliate KTUU and the Anchorage Daily News.

In 2009, the site earned positive coverage for its series on a massacre of caribou in the rural Alaska village of Point Hope. In 2010, the Columbia Journalism Review called Alaska Dispatch "a regional reporting powerhouse," while the American Journalism Review did a lengthy profile of the news site's willingness to fly a reporter thousands of miles to cover the Deepwater Horizon oil spill in the Gulf of Mexico. In that same profile, an editor of the Anchorage Daily News newspaper, at the time one of the site's competitors, referred to Alaska Dispatch's coverage as inconsistent, and questioned the sustainability of its business model.

In 2011, Alaska Dispatch won first place in the breaking news category in the "Best of the West" journalism competition for its coverage of the August 2010 plane crash that killed former U.S. Senator Ted Stevens and four others, beating out the larger-market Oregonian and Seattle Times newspapers for the top prize. In 2012, a report detailing the problems surrounding a remote airport project servicing the Aleutian community of Akutan won first place in the Best General Reporting category.

The site covered many statewide topics, with a particular focus on oil and gas policies in Alaska, fisheries and wildlife management, outdoor activities such as sled dog mushing and mountaineering, rural affairs and Alaska Native corporations, Alaska politics, and worldwide Arctic geopolitics and climate change. The organization also featured a "Bush Pilot" section, which covers aviation topics in Alaska and abroad.

In April 2014, it was announced that the Alaska Dispatch would be buying the Anchorage Daily News for $34 million. Now under new ownership, the Anchorage Daily News was renamed the Alaska Dispatch News, reflecting the newspaper's statewide focus while preserving its recognizable "ADN" abbreviation and domain name, three months later. The news outlets merged their websites in July 2014 as well.

In 2017, Alaska Dispatch News declared bankruptcy following issues with its lease and the general downturn in newspaper circulation. The organization was sold for $1 million to the Binkley Group, and paper reverted to its previous name Anchorage Daily News.

== Editorial staff ==
Editorial staff in 2013, prior to ADN merger

- Tony Hopfinger (executive editor)
- Mike Campbell (managing editor)
- Loren Holmes (multimedia editor / photographer)
- Eric Adams (news editor)
- Scott Woodham (news editor)
- Ben Anderson (reporter)
- Laurel Andrews (reporter)
- Jill Burke (reporter)
- Suzanna Caldwell (reporter)
- Alex DeMarban (reporter)
- Pat Forgey (reporter)
- Aaron Jansen (art director)
- Craig Medred (reporter)
- Megan Edge (calendar editor / writer)
- Tara Young (videographer)
- Jerzey Shedlock (reporter)
- Sean Doogan (reporter)
- Yereth Rosen (arctic editor / writer)
- Rick Sinnott (reporter)
