= Arctic Circle (organization) =

International non-profit organization

- Established: 2013; 13 years ago
- Type: Nonprofit organization
- Location: Menntavegur 1, 101 Reykjavík, Iceland
- Chairman: Ólafur Ragnar Grímsson
- Key people: Ásdís Ólafsdóttir (CEO)
- Website: http://www.arcticcircle.org

Arctic Circle is an organization founded by former President of Iceland Ólafur Ragnar Grímsson, founder and former CEO of CargoMetrics Scott Borgerson, former Alaska Dispatch Publisher Alice Rogoff, former Premier of Greenland Kuupik Kleist and other partners. The organization's mission is to facilitate dialogue among political and business leaders, environmental experts, scientists, indigenous representatives, and other international stakeholders to address issues facing the Arctic as a result of climate change and melting sea ice. The Arctic Circle styles itself as an international organization with a Secretariat based in Reykjavík, Iceland.

== History ==
At his introduction of Arctic Circle organization on April 15, 2013, at the National Press Club in Washington, D.C., Iceland President Ólafur Ragnar Grímsson said that "the Arctic has suffered from a lack of global awareness and, as a result, a lack of effective governance. In the past, the region did not matter to the world's decision-makers and was largely forgotten. Now, with sea-ice levels at their lowest point in recorded history, the world is waking up to the challenges and opportunities the Arctic presents for its citizens as well as those who live in lower latitudes."

Participants in Arctic Circle's events since its inaugural Assembly in October 2013 have included institutional and governmental representatives, political and policy leaders, scientists and experts, activists, and indigenous people from the Arctic countries, as well as Asia, Europe, and elsewhere. Topics of focus have included sea melt and extreme weather, security in the Arctic, fisheries and ecosystem management, indigenous rights, shipping and transportation, infrastructure, Arctic resources, and tourism.

== Mission ==
The stated mission of the Arctic Circle is "to facilitate dialogue and build relationships to address rapid changes in the Arctic" and "strengthen the decision-making process by bringing together as many international partners as possible to interact under one large 'open tent.'" The organization was established in response to issues facing the Arctic as a result of climate change and melting sea ice—such as oil and gas exploration, environmental concerns, national security, and the effects on indigenous populations — as well as the growing international interest in the region. With the opening of shipping lanes and other economic activity in the Arctic, the organization says, the region "is moving to center stage and is playing a significant role in issues such as globalization, economic development, energy exploration, environmental protection and international security."

== Assemblies and Forums ==
Arctic Circle held its first open assembly October 12–14, 2013, in Reykjavík, Iceland, at the Harpa Reykjavík Concert Hall and Conference Centre. Held every October since then, the annual Assembly is described as "a new mechanism for existing institutions, organizations, forums, think tanks, corporations and public associations to reach a global audience in an efficient way."

According to the organization's website, Arctic Circle holds smaller events in different locations around the world, "so that participants can become familiar with the challenges, needs and opportunities presented by these unique environments." Arctic Circle forums have been held in Alaska, and Singapore, Greenland, Quebec City, and Washington, D.C. The organization will also help facilitate smaller meetings of organizations and individuals to discuss Arctic matters.

Speakers that have attended the Arctic Circle Assembly have included Ban Ki-moon, Nicola Sturgeon, Aleqa Hammond, Lisa Murkowski, Philippe Couillard, and François Hollande, who delivered a keynote speech at the 2015 Assembly as President of France. During his speech, Hollande discussed the importance of the Arctic as an arena for international climate action. Situating the Arctic on the front lines of anthropogenic planetary warming, President Hollande expressed optimism that global leaders would make an agreement on the reduction of greenhouse gas emissions at the then-upcoming 2015 United Nations Climate Change Conference, and urged global leaders to strengthen their commitments towards an accord, given the remaining progress that must be made before the conference. Ghislaine Maxwell has twice addressed the Arctic Circle's conferences.

Angela Merkel, Hillary Clinton, Philip Hammond, Al Gore and José Ángel Gurría have addressed the Assembly via video messages.

== The Arctic Circle Prize ==
The Arctic Circle Prize was awarded for the first time at the 2016 Arctic Circle Assembly to Ban Ki-moon, then-Secretary-General of the United Nations. In awarding the prize, Ólafur Ragnar Grímsson explained that the prize recognized Mr. Ban's leadership in international climate diplomacy, which he described as "an act of extraordinary statesmanship, courage and vision" given political opposition at the time he took up his mandate.

The Prize is intended to honor "individuals, institutions, or associations whose work has been of critical importance to the future of the Arctic." The decision to award the Prize to Ban Ki-moon was attributed to the Secretary-General's key role in the success of the COP21 Paris Climate negotiations.

Upon accepting the Prize, the Secretary-General acknowledged his own efforts in climate negotiations, but emphasized the important contributions from governmental and civil society leaders, whom, he argued, deserved to share the prize with him. When he accepted the prize "on behalf of tens of thousands of dedicated leaders" in "business, civil society, and NGOs" who have worked with the United Nations in the climate change endeavors, he urged Arctic Circle Assembly participants to ensure that indigenous peoples, their rights and their sociocultural contributions, remain central as we address these shared challenges.

== Compared with the Arctic Council ==
Reykjavík University, where the Arctic Circle Secretariat is housed.

As part of its mission, Arctic Circle aims to convene "as many international partners as possible to interact under one large 'open tent,'" as well as to "support, complement and extend the reach of the work of the Arctic Council by facilitating a broad exchange of ideas and information." In contrast, the Arctic Council, an intergovernmental body established in 1996, includes only eight countries with a speaking role: Canada, Denmark, Finland, Iceland, Norway, Russia, Sweden, and the United States. The establishment of Arctic Circle has raised concerns that the organization may give countries such as China, India, and Singapore a greater voice in Arctic affairs. The Canadian newspaper The Globe and Mail called it "a move that seems certain to irk some northern nations" and added that it "will be seen as complicating, if not challenging, the primacy of the Arctic Council in the rapidly changing north." "The question," wrote environmental journalist Irene Quaile, "is which forum will turn out to be the best placed to effectively protect the sensitive ecosystems and traditional lifestyles of indigenous groups in the Arctic at the time when international commercial interest is growing steadily."

As the 1996 Ottawa Declaration, a founding document of the Arctic Council, explicitly stipulates that the Council "should not deal with matters related to military security," a 2014 RAND Corporation publication suggested that security dialogue "leverage existing international conferences, such as that run by the Arctic Circle Assembly, where participation can be ad hoc and security is already an item of discussion."

== Board members ==
Arctic Circle's honorary board is chaired by former President of Iceland Ólafur Ragnar Grímsson. Other honorary board members include Prince Albert II of Monaco, Premier of Quebec Philippe Couillard Russian polar explorer Artur Chilingarov, former Greenland Prime Minister Kuupik Kleist, Dr. Sultan Ahmed Al Jaber, the Minister of Industry and Advanced Technology in the United Arab Emirates, and U.S. Senator Lisa Murkowski of Alaska. The organization's advisory board is led by Alice Rogoff, former publisher of Alaska Dispatch, and is composed of business leaders, scientists, indigenous representatives, heads of environmental organizations and policymakers.

== See also ==
- Arctic Economic Council
