= PreTesting Company =

American Market research company

- Type: Limited liability corporation
- Industry: Marketing
- Founded: Tenafly, NJ (1985)
- Founder: Lee Weinblatt
- Headquarters: Tenafly, NJ, United States
- Number of locations: 1
- Area served: North America
- Services: Market research, Copy testing, Marketing
- Website: pretesting.com

PreTesting Company is a full-service Market research company founded in 1985 that specializes in print, television, and radio ad copy testing.

== History ==
PreTesting Company was founded in 1985 by American inventor and market researcher Lee Weinblatt. After beginning his career at Perception Research, Weinblatt started Telcom Research, a company that manufactured recorders that used an infrared beam to track a viewer as he watched a commercial in a research setting. Weinblatt sold the company in 1983.

In 1985, Weinblatt started PreTesting Company in order to provide advertising companies with insights into the effectiveness of their print, radio, and TV ads. The company tests subjects in situations where they are unaware of how - and why - they're being tested, ensuring authentic, unbiased results.

== Saccadic Eye Movement ==
PreTesting Company’s most advanced innovation to date has been a recording device that tracks movements of the eye, called saccades. Through saccadic eye tracking, Pretesting Company can determine not only where a viewer is looking as he’s watching an ad, but also how visually stimulating the ad is. These results can help companies gauge whether their ads are visually stimulating enough to keep the viewers attention, or in contrast, whether they're so visually stimulating that no actual information is absorbed.
