= Arktikum =

Coordinates: 66°30′27″N 025°43′34″E

Arktikum Science Museum
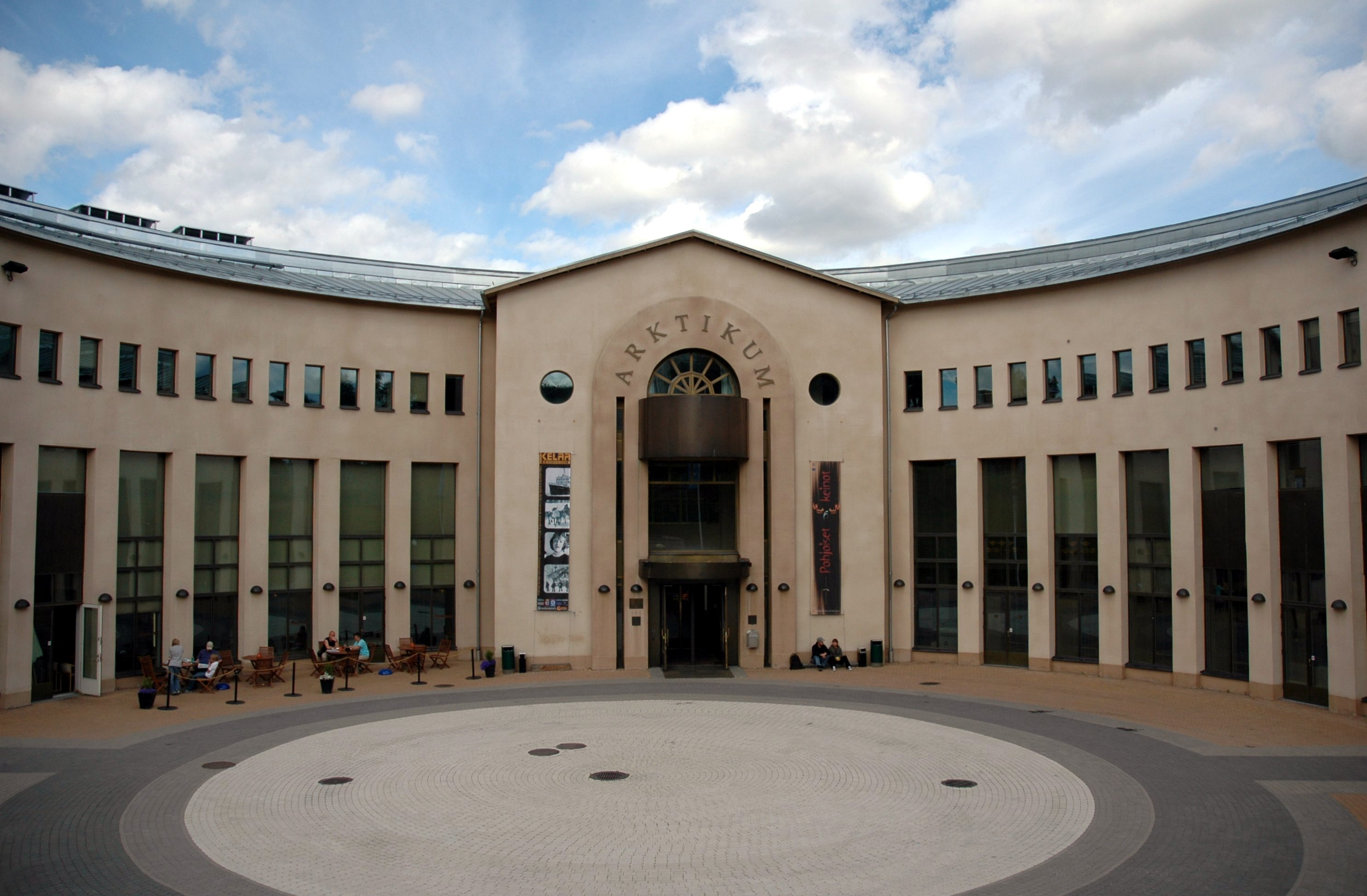
- Established: 1992
- Location: Rovaniemi, Finland
- Type: Science museum
- Website: Official website

Arktikum is a museum and science centre in Rovaniemi, Finland, which opened in 1992. The building is also a popular cultural destination and venue for meetings and conferences and has a cafe and library to serve the customers. Two separate exhibitions operate at Arktikum: the Arctic Center's science centre, and the regional museum of Lapland, founded in 1975.

== Exhibitions ==
The exhibitions at the Provincial Museum of Lapland and the Arctic Center examine culture, history, and modern life in the Arctic. Concepts such as human life in tune with nature are explored in depth. There are also temporary exhibitions at Arktikum.

== History ==
Arktikum opened to the public on 6 December 1992, the 75th anniversary of Finland's independence. It was designed by Danish architect group Birch-Bonderup & Thorup-Waade. The crescent-shaped new annex was designed by Claus Bonderup and Janne Lehtipalo, and it was completed in autumn 1997.

== Architecture ==
Plenty of local natural materials have been used in the building: the floors are made from Perttaus granite – the hardest type available in Finland – and from lime-washed Lapland pine. The chairs are made from birch and reindeer hide.

The most visible part of the museum, its glass corridor, is 172 metres long in all and it is bisected by the 30-metre wide Kittilä highway. The tube serves as the "Gateway to the North", as the entrance foyer is at the southern end and guests head north when coming in. The exhibition space is sheltered below the ground, mimicking the way animals in the North take cover from the harsh, cold winter by burrowing under the snow.

== Gallery ==
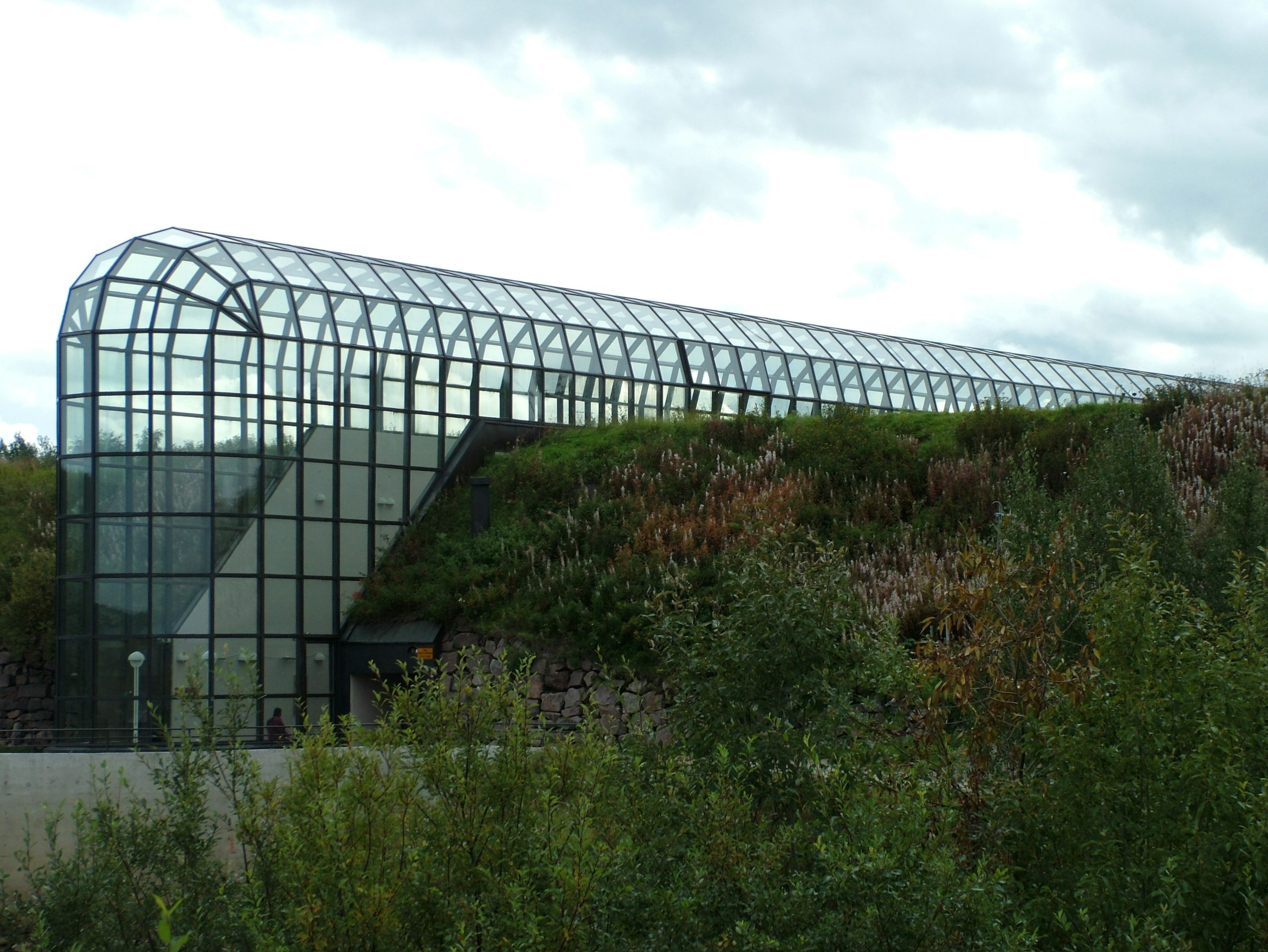
Building

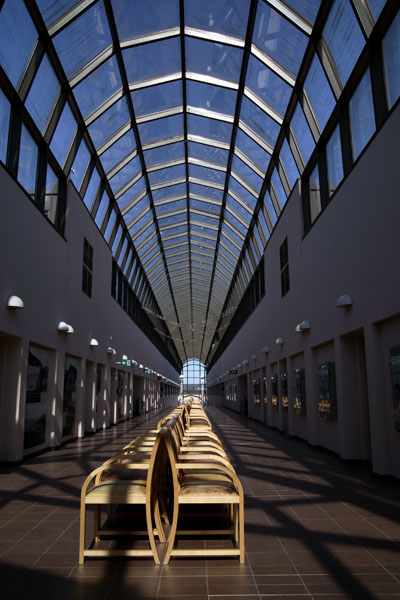
Main hall

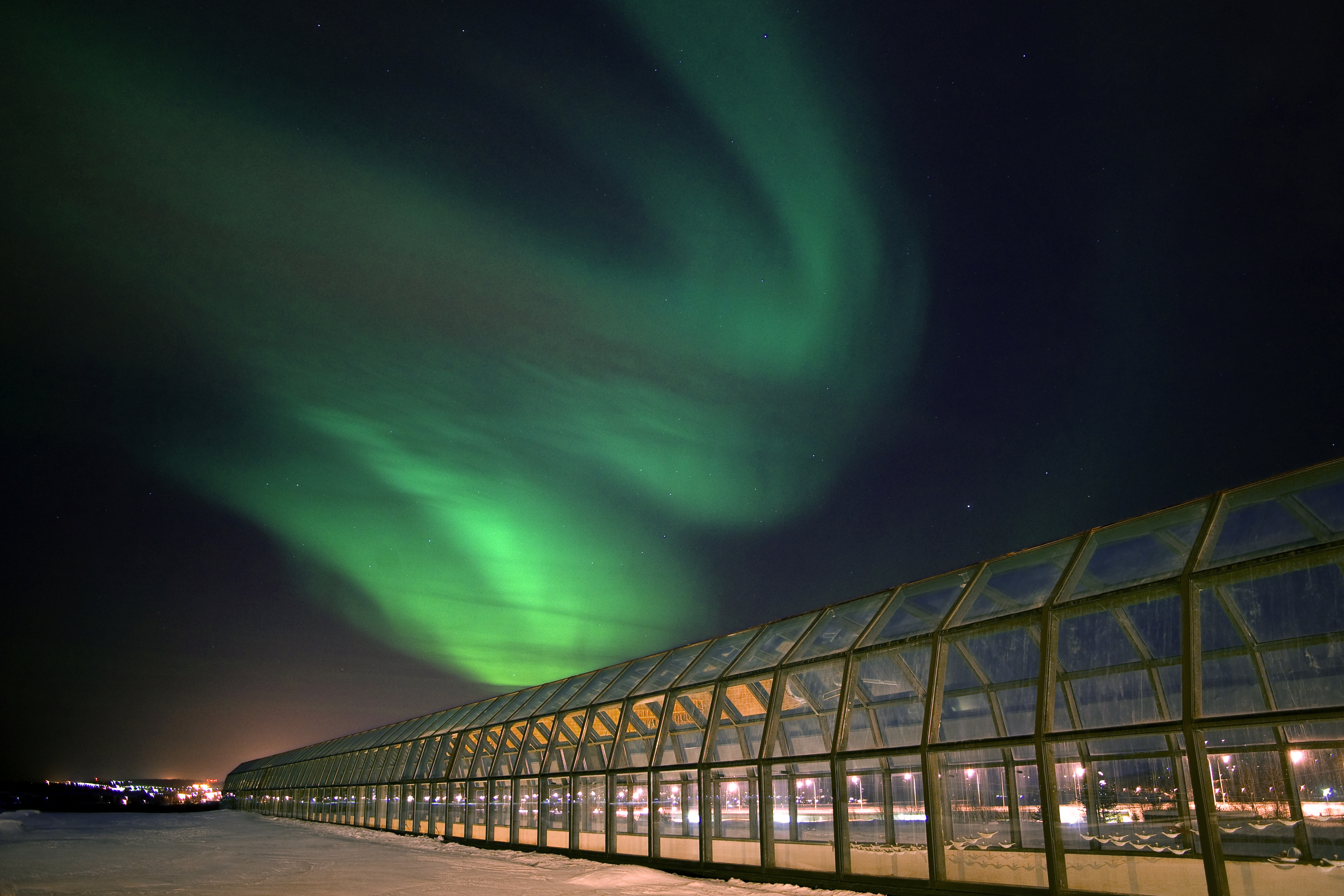
Northern lights

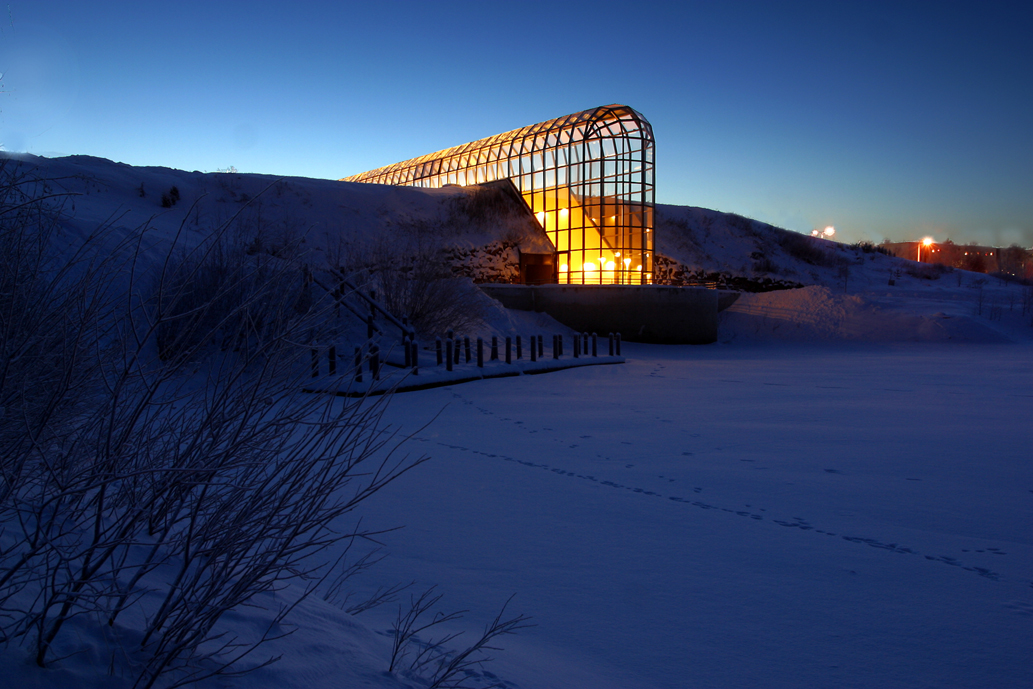
Winter

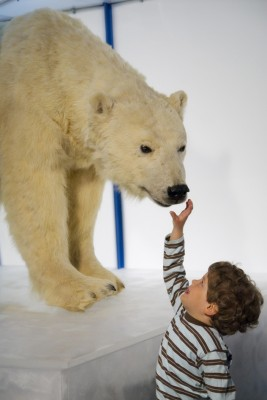
Arctic exhibition

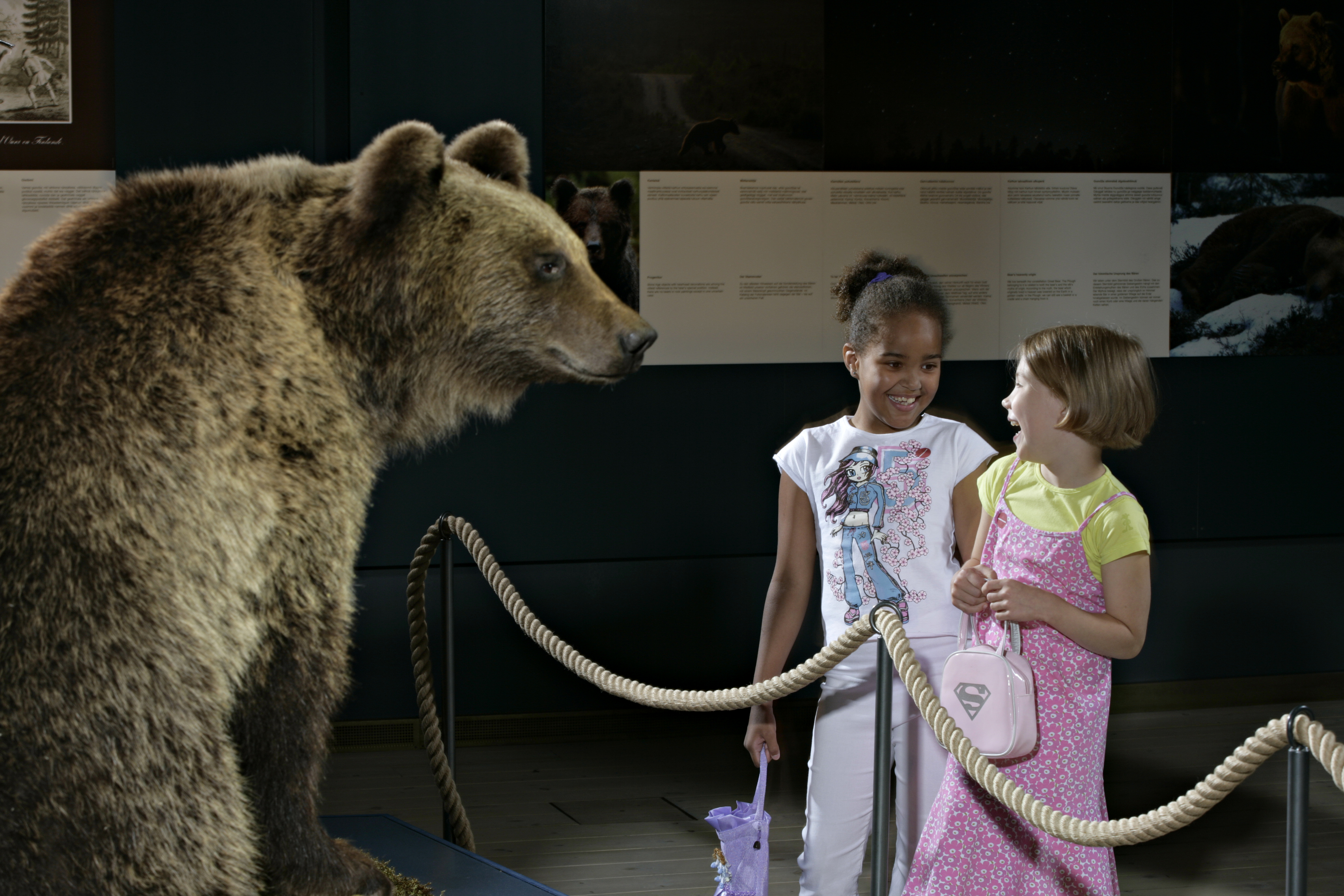
Northern Ways exhibition

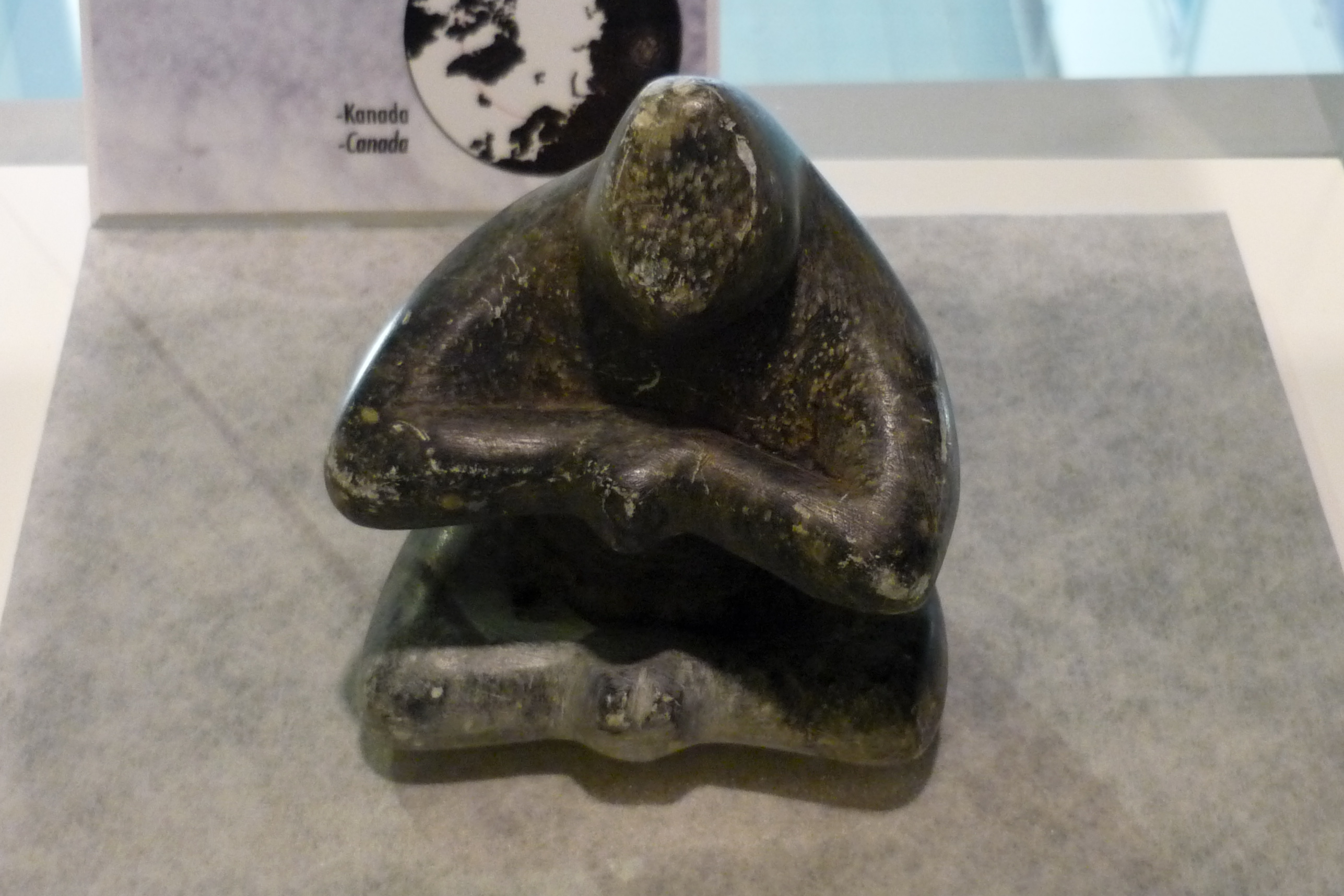
Inuit sculpture
