= Timo Koivurova =

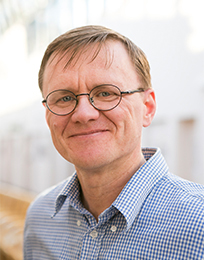
Research Professor, Director Timo Koivurova

Timo Koivurova (born 19 March 1967 in Helsinki) is a research professor of the Arctic Centre, University of Lapland, Finland. He served as the director of the Centre from 2015 to 2020. His doctoral dissertation in 2001 was on environmental impact assessment in the Arctic. He became the director of the Northern Institute for Environmental and Minority Law 2003 and research professor in 2004.

== Career ==
Koivurova has led many international and national research projects and published widely on Arctic legal issues, especially on indigenous rights, law of the sea, environmental law and Arctic governance. He has investigated how to improve Arctic governance via a legally binding treaty. He has also taken stance on how indigenous peoples’ rights should be improved globally and in the Nordic context and suggested that the European Court of Human Rights should amend its jurisprudence in order to give adequate protection to indigenous rights. Koivurova has also taken stance on whether there are dangers for the Arctic to become again a theatre of military operations, arguing that such danger is extremely minor. He has also written extensively on how climate change should be addressed as a human rights problem.

== Memberships and awards ==
Koivurova is a member in a number of Finnish and International Arctic boards and as one of the leading experts on Arctic governance he is keenly involved in the work of the Arctic Council, especially during the Finnish Arctic Council chairmanship (2017-2019). During the chairmanship, Koivurova is a co-chair of the Arctic Council’s Social, Economic and Cultural Expert Group.

He is a member of the Board of Directors of the Arctic Research Consortium of the United States, Executive committee member of the European Polar Board and board member of the China Nordic Arctic Research Centre. He is also a member of the Finnish government’s Arctic delegation and the foreign ministry’s group of experts on human rights in Finland’s foreign policy. He is one of organizers of the Rovaniemi Arctic Spirit conference and a member of the advisory committee of the Arctic Circle conference. He has served in the Norwegian Research Council in various programme committees.

The article that he wrote with his colleagues Paula Kankaanpää and Adam Stepien received an honorary mention by the Oxford University Press.

Koivurova acts as the Editor-in-Chief of the Oxford University Press's Yearbook of International Environmental Law and of Brill’s Yearbook of Polar Law.

Koivurova was invited to the Finnish Academy of Science and Letters.
