= Mortimer Rogoff =

American inventor, businessman, and author

Mortimer Alan Rogoff (May 2, 1921 – August 1, 2008) was an American inventor, businessman, and author as well as an amateur photographer and radio operator. He is recognized for his work in spread spectrum technology which is the technology that modern cell phones and GPS systems are based on. He is also considered the grandfather of the electronic navigation chart.

== Early life ==
Rogoff was born in Brooklyn, New York. He earned his B.S.E.E. from Rensselaer Polytechnic Institute in 1943 and his M.S.E.E. from Columbia University in 1948. While at Rensselaer he was a member of Kappa Nu fraternity and the Features Editor for the student newspaper.

During World War II, he enlisted in the United States Navy and worked on developing radio communication and aerial navigation systems. One of the techniques he developed was undetectable by Axis forces because its power was below that of the background noise and its frequency varied in random ways. This secure transmission was the beginning of spread spectrum technology which would become the basis for GPS and CDMA cellular telephone systems. Although he was never able to patent the technology because it was a military secret he did get some recognition for it almost forty years later when he received the Institute of Electrical and Electronics Engineers’ Pioneer Award in 1981.

== Career ==
Rogoff worked for twenty-two years (1946 to 1968) for ITT Laboratories in New Jersey. In 1958, he became their deputy director of Engineering. He was Vice President of ITT Laboratories from 1962 to 1963. From 1963 to 1968, he was promoted to the corporate staff where he became head of European operations. In 1968 he left ITT to work for the Diebold Group where he became an Executive Vice President.

After leaving the Diebold Group he founded several technology and automation businesses, including his own consulting firm, and Teletext Communications Corporation. Later in the 1970s, he was a Principal with Booz Allen Hamilton. In 1979, his book ‘’Calculator Navigation’’ was published. This book demonstrated practical methods for calculating precise ship locations using radio navigation with a consumer calculator.

In 1981, he founded a new company, Navigation Sciences Inc., in Bethesda, Maryland. With this company he patented a method for marine navigation that combined radar maps with electronic charts in 1986. This was a major advancement in field. Today, this system is known as the Electronic Chart Display and Information System (ECDIS). Rogoff had seen the need for a new charting system in 1968 from his apartment at 180 East End Avenue in New York City. From there, he saw a boating accident where a life was lost and decided there had to be a way to automate navigation.

Rogoff then became of member of the International Maritime Organization’s (IMO) sub-committee on Safety of Navigation, a representative to the International Electrotechnical Commission, and became the chairman of the Radio Technical Commission for Maritime Services Special Committee 109 on Electronic Charts. He was able to use his influence on these boards to push through a proposal of ECDIS standards in 1989 where none has been before. As his friend Giuseppe Carnevali said, “Although nobody could argue against the need for a standard, no one was ready to endorse one; however, nobody was brave enough to oppose it.” A Test Bed project on these proposals was conducted by the United States Coast Guard. The amended standards were accepted by the IMO in November, 1995.

In 2000, he was named as a Fellow of the Institute of Navigation. He was also a Fellow of the Institute of Electrical and Electronics Engineers. During this time, he was also president of the Navigational Electronic Charts System Association.

== Personal ==
In 1979, he moved to Washington, D.C. and bought a home in Nantucket, Massachusetts. He married Sheila Zunser in 1943 and they were together for sixty-five years. They had three daughters: Louisa Thompson, Alice Rogoff, and Julia Peach. His sister was sociologist Natalie Rogoff Ramsøy of the University of Oslo. He was a member of the Cosmos Club and President of The Navigational Electronic Chart System Association (NECSA). He was a very good amateur photographer and liked amateur radio (call sign W2EE). He died in Nantucket from bladder cancer.

== Patents ==
Patent number: 4176316 – Secure Communication System – November 27, 1979 With Louis A. DeRosa
Patent number: 4590569 – Electronic Navigation System – May 20, 1986 With Peter M. Winkler and John N. Ackley
Patent number: RE34004 – Secure Communication System – July 21, 1992 With Louis A. DeRosa

== Publications ==
- Rogoff, Mortimer September 1957. Automatic Analysis of Infrared Spectra. Annals of the New York Academy of Sciences; vol. 69: no. 1: 27–37.
- Gen. P.C. Sandretto and Mortimer Rogoff. 1958 “A Novel Concept for Application to the Control of Airways Traffic.” NAVIGATION: Journal of The Institute of Navigation; vol. 6: no. 2: 102–107
- Rogoff, Mortimer 1979. Calculator Navigation; ISBN 0-393-03192-6. Published by W.W. Norton & Company (New York and London).
- Rogoff, Mortimer December 1985. Electronic Charting. Yachting; vol. 158: no. 6: 54–57.
- Rogoff, Mortimer Winter 1990. Electronic Charts in the Nineties. NAVIGATION: Journal of The Institute of Navigation; vol. 37: no. 4: 305–318.
