= Douglas Bradburn =

American historian and author

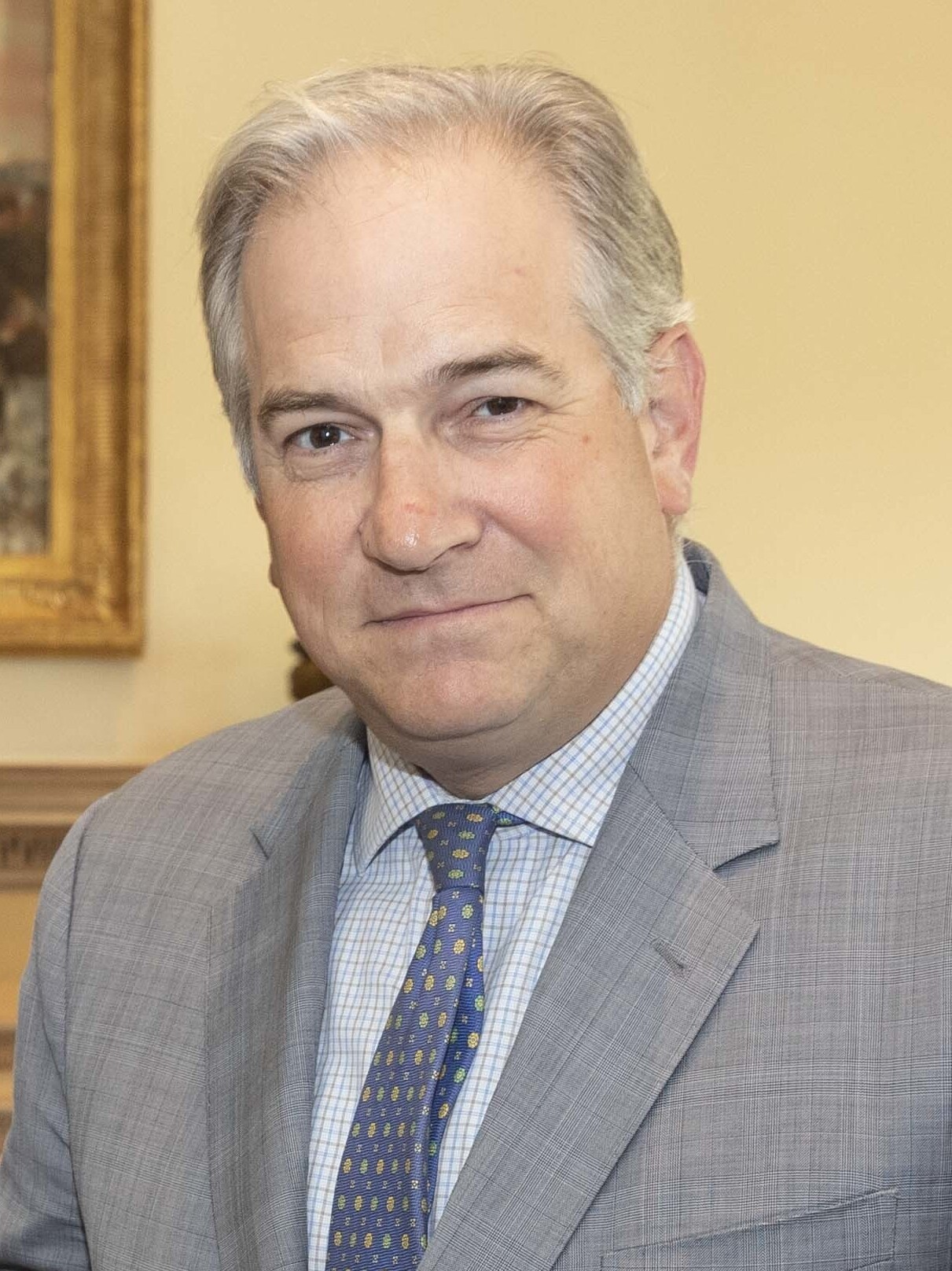
- Bradburn in 2022
- Born: 1972 (age 53–54); Wisconsin, U.S.
- Education: University of Virginia (BA, BS); University of Chicago (PhD)
- Occupations: Historian; author

Douglas Bradburn (born 1972) is an American historian, author, and since 2018 has been the president and CEO at George Washington's Mount Vernon. Bradburn was born in Wisconsin but was raised in Virginia. He began his service at George Washington's Mount Vernon in 2013 and has functioned as the founding director for the Fred W. Smith National Library, which is devoted to the study of George Washington's life and his role in the American Revolution era, and which also serves as a forum for scholarly research and leadership development. Bradburn has an extensive background in teaching history and advancing historical scholarship.

== Education and career ==
Bradburn holds a B.A. in history and a B.S. in economics from the University of Virginia and a PhD in history from the University of Chicago. As an acclaimed scholar and expert in early American history, he is the author and editor of several books and numerous articles and book chapters focusing on the founding of American, its leadership, and the history surrounding the progression of the American people.

Bradburn is a member of the Organization of American Historians, the American Historical Association, the Society for Historians of the Early Republic and is an associate of the Omohundro Institute of Early American History and Culture, Southern Historical Association.

Bradburn's professional career involvements during the twenty-first century have included: serving as adjunct professor of history, DePaul University in 2000; in 2001 was the Von Holst Prize Lecturer, in the Department of History at University of Chicago. From 2002 to 2003 he was the CBS Bicentennial Scholar, in the Division of Humanities, at the University of Chicago, From 2003 to 2004 he was an adjunct professor of history and lecturer at Northern Illinois University; in 2004 he was the faculty fellow and a Newberry Library Undergraduate Seminar at Newberry Library in Chicago, Illinois; in 2004 and 2005 he was the Gilder Lehrman Research Fellow at the Robert H. Smith International Center for Jefferson Studies, Monticello. From 2005 to 2008 he was the assistant professor of history at Binghamton University. From 2008 to 2013 he was an associate professor of history at Binghamton University. From 2011 to 2013 he was vice chair and director of graduate studies, History Department, also at Binghamton University; Bradburn is a member of the editorial board that oversees the extensive collection of the Washington Papers. From 2013 to 2022 he has been the founding director of the Fred W. Smith National Library for the Study of George Washington at Mount Vernon, Virginia. Under the direction of Bradburn, he has expanded Mount Vernon's programming to include thousands of researchers and educators of American history across America.

Bradburn has been awarded numerous honors and grants, and is on the advisory committees of many universities and historical foundations.

== Selected works ==
- Bradburn, Douglas (July 2008). "A Clamor in the Public Mind: Opposition to the Alien and Sedition Acts". The William and Mary Quarterly. 65 (3). Omohundro Institute of Early American History and Culture: 565–600. JSTOR 25096814.
- Early Modern Virginia: Reconsidering the Old Dominion, editor, with John C. Coombs; Charlottesville, VA: University of Virginia Press, 2011
- Bradburn, Douglas (2009). The Citizenship Revolution: Politics and the Creation of the American Union, 1774–1804. Charlottesville, VA: University of Virginia Press. ISBN 9780813930312.
- Washington's War: General George Washington and the Revolutionary War (2018),
- A More Perfect Union: George Washington and the Creation of the U.S. Constitution (2017)
- The Winter Patriots (2015)
