= Lindsay Chervinsky =

American historian

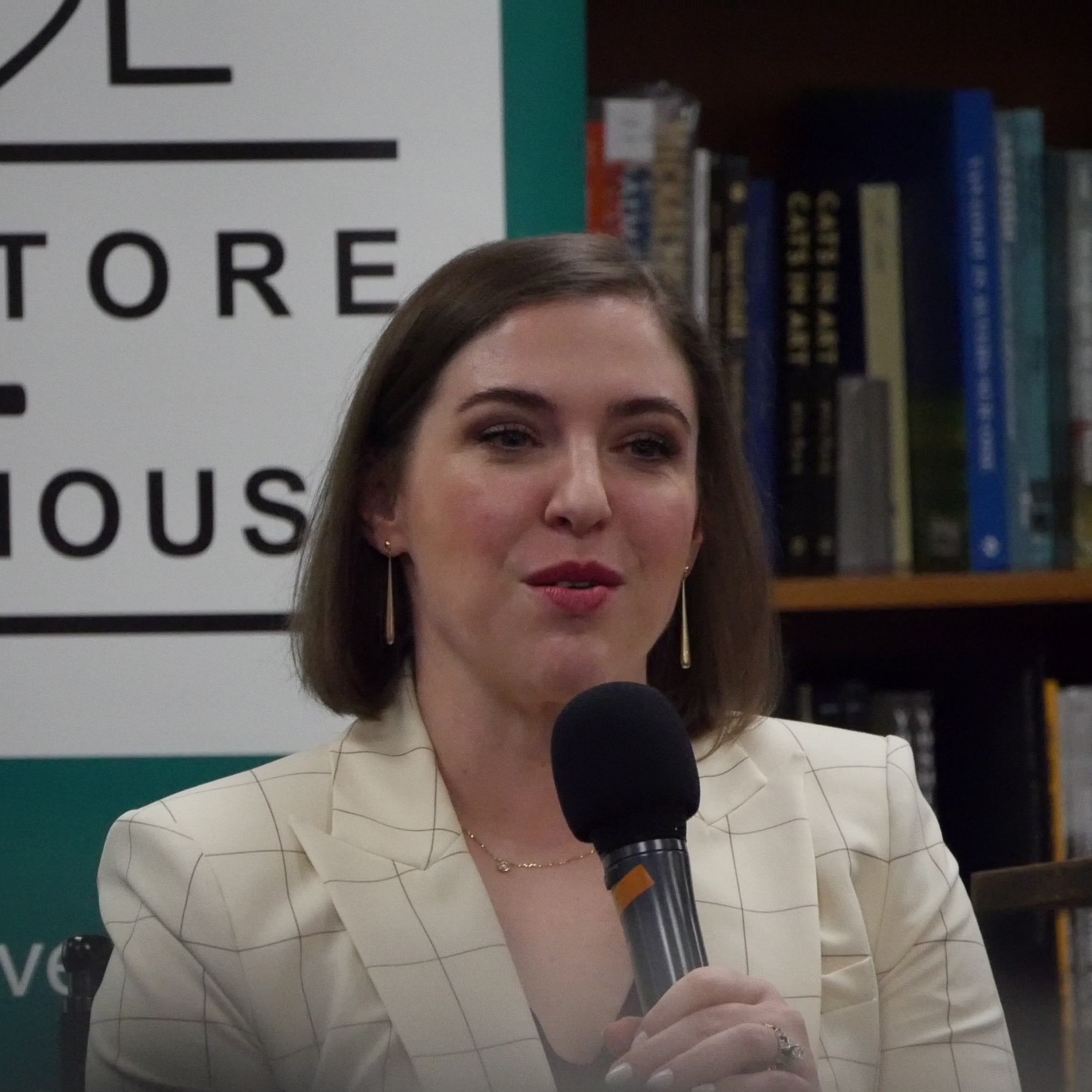
Chervinsky in 2024

Lindsay M. Chervinsky (born Lindsay M. Bowles) is an American presidential historian who is executive director of the George Washington Presidential Library at Mount Vernon. She is a political historian.

== Early life and education ==
Chervinsky was born in California. She holds a BA in history and political science from George Washington University. She received her master's (2014) and PhD (2017) from the University of California, Davis.

== Career ==
Chervinsky was a historian at the White House Historical Association. She was then a postdoctoral fellow at the Center for Presidential History at Southern Methodist University, a fellow at the Kluge Center at the Library of Congress, and the Kundrun open rank fellow at the International Center for Jefferson Studies at Monticello. Her work has received fellowship funding from numerous organizations, including the Library of Congress, the Society of the Cincinnati, the International Center for Jefferson Studies, and the National Library for the Study of George Washington. She has recently been named the executive director of the George Washington Presidential Library at Mount Vernon. She is cited and interviewed for her expertise on presidential elections. She was featured on Wired’s “Tech Support” in 2025.

=== Authorship and research ===
Chervinsky is the author of The Cabinet: George Washington and the Creation of an American Institution, which was published by Belknap/Harvard University Press in April 2020.The Wall Street Journal says of her writing, “[Chervinsky] argues persuasively that focusing on its development helps us understand pivotal moments in the 1790s and the creation of an independent, effective executive.”

The Cabinet was awarded the 2021 NSDAR Excellence in American History Book Award by the Daughters of the American Revolution, a Finalist for the 2020 Journal of the American Revolution Book of the Year Award, and Co-Winner, 2019 Thomas J. Wilson Memorial Prize.

Chervinsky's second book was an edited volume with co-editor Matthew R. Costello, entitled Mourning the Presidents: Loss and Legacy in American Culture published by University of Virginia Press in 2023. Her third book, Making the Presidency: John Adams and the Precedents that Forged the Republic, was published by Oxford University Press in September 2024.

Chervinsky has written for the Wall Street Journal, Time, USA Today, CNN, Washington Monthly, and the Washington Post."

== Personal life ==
In 2014, she married Jacob Chervinsky, general counsel at Compound Labs, Inc., a financial technology company.

== Published works ==
- The Cabinet: George Washington and the Creation of an American Institution, Harvard University Press, 2020. ISBN 9780674986480
- Mourning the Presidents: Loss and Legacy in American Culture, University of Virginia Press, 2023. ISBN 978-0813949291
- Chervinsky, Lindsay M. (2024). Making the Presidency. New York, NY: Oxford University Press. ISBN 978-0-19-765384-5.

== See also ==
- List of women historians by area of study
