= Claus Bonderup =

Danish architect

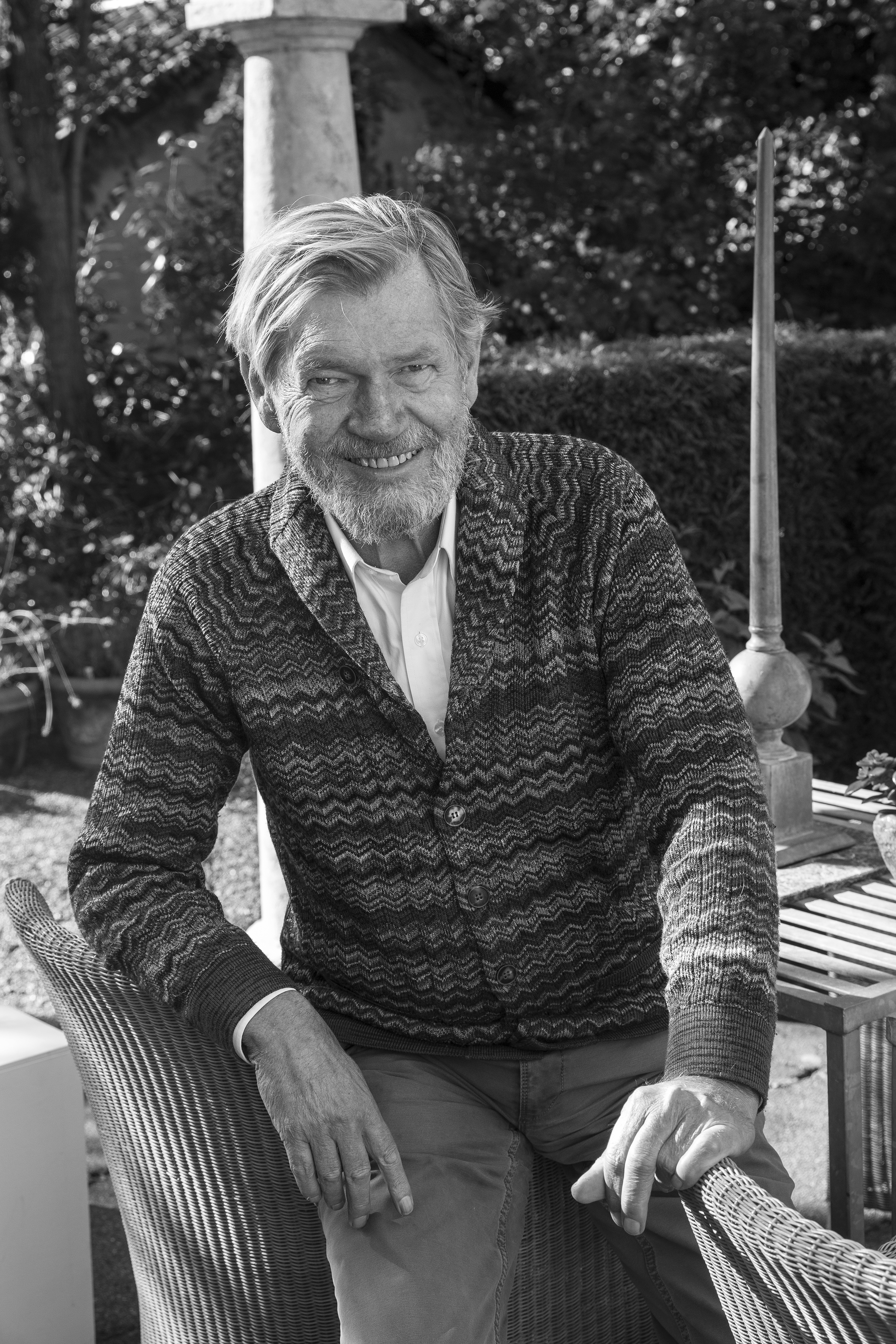
- Born: November 14, 1943; Aalborg, Danmark
- Died: May 10, 2022 (aged 78)

Claus Bonderup (14 November 1943 – 10 May, 2022) was a Danish architect and professor emeritus in architecture at Aalborg University. He created a large number of edifices and designs as well as city plans. Among the most renowned are the Arctic Museum in Rovaniemi, Finland, the palace of the Kuwaiti Sheik Salkem Al-Ali Al-Sabah and Professor Bonderup’s own house in the dunes near the town of Blokhus in the northern part of Jutland.

Claus Bonderup is internationally recognised for his contribution to lighting design, a field in which he collaborated extensively with Torsten Thorup from 1967 to 1992. Together, they designed a series of lamps characterised by geometric forms, simplicity and functionalism, reflecting the rationalist principles of Danish modernist design. Among their best-known designs is the Semi pendant lamp, created in 1968 while they were still students and subsequently produced by Fog & Mørup, as well as the Pendel 1011, Pendel 1021, Confetti and Quarto lamps, which were originally produced by the Danish manufacturer Focus Belysning during the 1970s. Designs by Claus Bonderup have also been used by companies such as Royal Copenhagen and Georg Jensen A/S. His works are represented in the permanent collection of the Museum of Modern Art in New York.

Following graduation from the Royal Danish Academy of Fine Arts, School of Architecture in 1969, Claus Bonderup worked at architectural practices both in Denmark and abroad. In 1991 he married the painter and ceramic artist Anne Just, with whom he established the famous garden of Hune. Six years later, Claus Bonderup became a professor at Aalborg University, and had since become a visiting professor at universities in France, Germany, Norway and Finland.

Professor Bonderup was awarded a number of prizes, including the industrial design competition at The Royal Danish Academy of Fine Arts and the Eckersberg Medal.
