= Lee Weinblatt =

American inventor and market researcher

Lee Weinblatt is an American inventor and market researcher. Weinblatt's 60 inventions focus on means to investigate consumer response to commercial products and advertising.

Weinblatt, who has a master's degree in industrial psychology, started his career at Perception Research, part of the Interpublic Group of Companies. Weinblatt's first assignment was for Philip Morris, who wanted to discern the most unobtrusive place to locate the Surgeon General's warning on the dangers of smoking, only to discover that it was largely ignored by smokers, regardless of where it was placed.

Weinblatt started Telcom Research, which manufactured recorders to track eye movement. The company was sold in 1982. The firm marketed use of a recorder that used an infrad red beam to track a viewer as he watched a commercial in a research setting.

He founded PreTesting Company in 1985, which monitors the effectiveness of advertising by monitoring consumer response to commercials. Clients include Ralston Purina, Planters peanuts, Raid insecticide, Sports Illustrated and The New Yorker.
