= Rick Sinnott =

American biologist

Rick Sinnott is a former Anchorage-area biologist for the Alaska Department of Fish and Game. He retired on June 30, 2010, after 30 years of service. His professional expertise and involvement in wildlife management issues made Sinnott a frequently-consulted source by the Anchorage-area media, becoming a minor local celebrity in the process. He is also known for his outspokenness on wildlife issues mainly, the interactions between Anchorage residents and urban wildlife. Since his retirement, Sinnott has been a regular contributor to the Anchorage Daily News.
