= Arctic Centre, University of Lapland =

Finnish research institute

Coordinates: 66.5075°N 25.7261°E

The Arctic Centre, University of Lapland is Finland’s national institute for Arctic expertise. It is based at the University of Lapland, the northernmost university in Finland and the EU, and is located in the Arktikum building by the Ounasjoki river in Rovaniemi near the Arctic Circle.

The Arctic Centre is internationally recognized for the quality and relevance of its multidisciplinary Arctic research. Through this research, the Arctic Centre promotes increased knowledge, awareness and understanding of the Arctic both within and outside the region. This research supports decision-making and sustainable development in the Arctic.

The multidisciplinary research at the Arctic Centre focuses on the interaction between man and the nature. International research is carried out in the arctic, subarctic and boreal zones. The research builds new multidisciplinary and interdisciplinary practices between natural and social environmental research. The Northern Institute for Environmental and Minority Law (NIEM) carries out research in environmental law and human rights law. The Arctic Centre also provides environmental impact assessment and environmental auditing services.

Professor Johanna Ikävalko is the director of the centre.

== The Arktikum Science Centre and Science Communications ==
Arctic in Change presents the conditions, nature, cultures and adaptation to extreme circumstances that occur in the far north as well as showcases multidisciplinary Arctic research in an interactive way that appeals to the general public. The exhibition highlights the developments, such as climate change and the status of indigenous peoples in an evolving world, that affect the North.

The Arctic Centre Science Communications adds to the understanding of Arctic themes by collecting information and communicating it to the general public, to experts and to various target groups. ArcticFinland.fi portal collects information on Finland’s Arctic policies and on Arctic research and Arctic business in Finland and it's maintained by the Arctic Centre Science Communications.
