= Fred W. Smith National Library for the Study of George Washington =

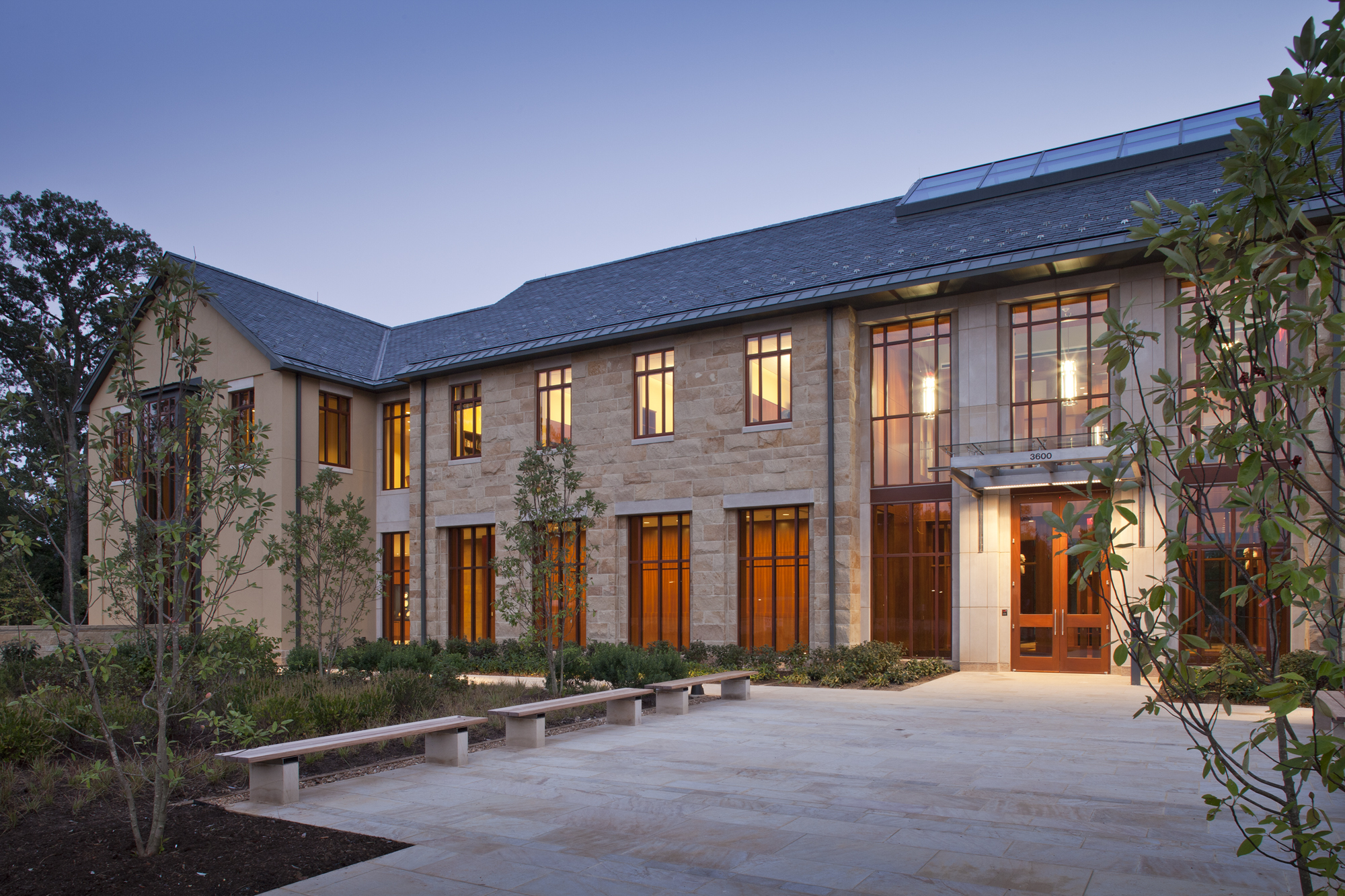

- Location within Northern Virginia Location within Virginia Location within the United States

General information
- Location: Fairfax County, Virginia, USA
- Coordinates: 38°42′47″N 77°5′17″W
- Named for: Fred W. Smith
- Construction started: 2010
- Inaugurated: Dedicated on September 27, 2013
- Cost: $106.4 million
- Operator: Lindsay Chervinsky

Technical details
- Size: 45,000 ft^{2} (4,200 m^{2})

Website
- www.mountvernon.org/library

The Fred W. Smith National Library for the Study of George Washington at Mount Vernon is the presidential library of George Washington, the first president of the United States. Located at Washington's home in Mount Vernon, Virginia, the library was built by the Mount Vernon Ladies' Association and is privately funded. It is named for the chairman of the Donald W. Reynolds Foundation which donated $38 million to the project. The library officially opened September 27, 2013.

== Description ==
The new library is 45,000 square feet (4,200 m^{2}) in a three-story building located on a 15-acre (6.1 ha) plot of land across the street from Mount Vernon's main entrance. The general library contains thousands of books, newspapers, pamphlets, microforms, electronic resources, maps, photographs, and periodicals belonging to Washington. These materials cover a variety of topics including George Washington, Martha Washington, Mount Vernon, the American Revolution, Colonial America, slavery, the Early Republic, and historical preservation. The library's special collections include rare books, documents, letters, farm books, and maps that pertain to Washington, his presidency, and family life. This collection also contains 103 books that once were part of Washington's collection in his home at Mount Vernon. The books are only a small portion of Washington's 900-title and 1,200-volume collection. The rest of this large collection was given to family members or sold in 1848 to bookseller Henry Stevens.

The new library also contains high-tech meeting rooms that will allow for lectures, conferences, and other meetings. The new Fred W. Smith National Library for the Study of George Washington also has a large oval vault. This vault contains a six-foot (1.8 m) pewter bas relief representation of Washington's bookplate that depicts the Washington family crest. The library is available to researchers and interested scholars of all ages by appointment only; library materials must be used within the building and cannot be checked out.

== Notable people ==
- Lindsay Chervinsky (living), presidential historian and GWPL director

== See also ==
- The Papers of George Washington
- Presidential memorials in the United States
