= Stuart Weinblatt =

American rabbi

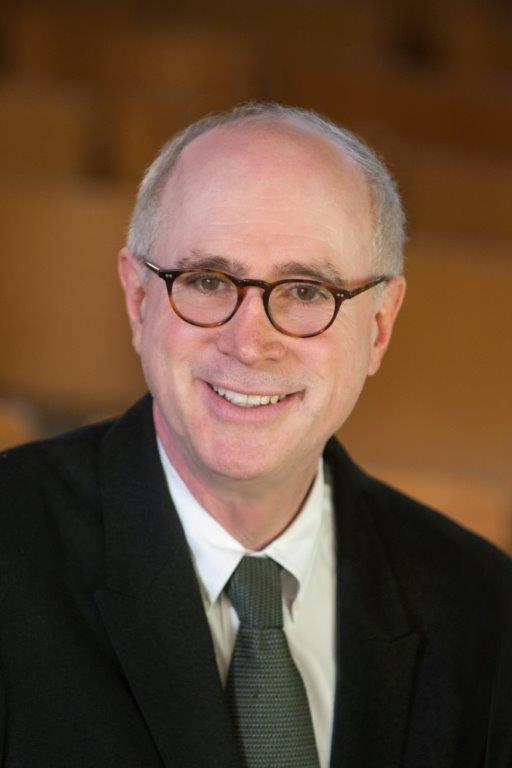
- Born: United States
- Education: University of Maryland, Hebrew Union College
- Occupation: Rabbi

Stuart Weinblatt is a conservative rabbi who was ordained in 1979 at the Hebrew Union College. He is Chairman of the Zionist Rabbinic Coalition, which he founded in 2020 and Rabbi Emeritus of Congregation B'nai Tzedek, a conservative synagogue he established in 1988, which now has about 600 families. Rabbi Weinblatt has held a number of leadership posts in local and national organizations, including as President of the Rabbinic Cabinet of the Jewish Federations of North America, and as the first chairman of the Jewish National Fund's affinity group "Rabbis for Israel."

== Biography ==
Born in Baltimore, Maryland, Weinblatt graduated from the University of Maryland in 1974 with high honors in history. As an undergraduate student, he served for over three years as Director of State Affairs for the student government. In this capacity he was the representative of the 30,000 students to the Maryland State government, frequently speaking before the committees of the State legislature and governor. When the voting age was lowered to eighteen he organized a voter registration drive which registered over 11,000 new voters. He also chaired the Committee for Jewish Studies at the university, which led to the creation of several faculty positions in Jewish Studies. He was elected to Who's Who Among Students in American Universities and Colleges|Who’s Who in American Colleges and Universities.

== Career & activities ==
Among the other leadership positions he has held in Jewish organizations at both the local and national level is as Director of Israel Policy and Advocacy for the Rabbinical Assembly, and President of the Washington Board of Rabbis. He has chaired two national conventions of the Rabbinical Assembly, and with his wife chaired the Annual Washington, DC Israel Bonds Ambassador's Ball.

In 2020, Weinblatt founded The Zionist Rabbinic Coalition (ZRC), a diverse group of over 1,000 Orthodox, Conservative and Reform rabbis from North America. The ZRC, whose mission is to express support for the State of Israel and Jewish unity has had extraordinary access, as they have had private meetings with Israeli and U.S. government officials.

Weinblatt has given the opening prayer as a guest chaplain for sessions of the U.S. House of Representatives, the United States Senate, the inaugurations of Maryland's Governors and Montgomery County Executives, both houses of the Maryland State legislature, and many other public gatherings.

Weinblatt worked for Camera, the Committee for Accuracy in the Middle East and Analysis when it was first getting started, and is on the Executive Council of Aipac, the board of Combat Antisemitism Movement and the Hidden Light Institute.

He has been an adjunct professor at Wesley Theological Seminary since 1992, teaching Jewish history and theology. As a result of his teaching, he was selected as a Bronfman Fellow by CLAL and as a Senior Rabbinic Fellow at the Shalom Hartman Institute of Jerusalem. Rabbi Weinblatt is the author of many articles and op-ed columns and is a sought-after speaker. His first book ‘’God, Prayer and Spirituality’’ is a compilation of his sermons and articles, and was published in 2008. His second book ‘’Living in the Shadow of Death: A Rabbi Copes with Cancer’’ traces his own battle with cancer and was published in May 2015.

== Family ==
Rabbi Weinblatt and his wife, Symcha, have four children and nine grandchildren.

== Awards ==
In 2016, Rabbi Weinblatt was chosen by the Forward as one of "America's Most Inspiring Rabbis." In recognition of his leadership and community involvement, in 2002, he was named “Man of the Year” by the Greater Washington area chapter of ORT and received the “Pillar of the Community” award from the Jewish Community Relations Council (JCRC) of Greater Washington in 2007. Weinblatt was named the “Best Rabbi in Washington” in a reader survey conducted by Washington Jewish Week multiple years.

== Bibliography ==
- God, Prayer and Spirituality (Jay Street Publishers, 2008) ISBN 978-1889534176
- Living in the Shadow of Death: A Rabbi Copes with Cancer (Urim Publications, 2015) ISBN 978-9655241709
