= Alice Rogoff =

American newspaper publishing executive, philanthropist and writer

- Born: Alice Nicole Rogoff; November 10, 1951 (age 74)
- Education: Connecticut College (BA); Harvard University (MBA)
- Spouse: David Rubenstein (m. 1983; div. 2017)
- Children: 3
- Parent: Mortimer Rogoff (father)

Alice Nicole Rogoff (born November 10, 1951) is an American newspaper publishing executive, philanthropist, writer, and pilot.

== Early life and education ==
Rogoff is the daughter of Mortimer Rogoff (1921–2008), former chairman and president of Navigation Sciences; her mother is the artist and muralist Sheila Rogoff. She has two siblings, Louisa Thompson and Julia Peach. Rogoff attended the Dalton School, Connecticut College, and Harvard Business School receiving an MBA degree in 1978.

== Career ==
Rogoff served for over 10 years as the chief financial officer for the magazine U.S. News & World Report. She worked at The Washington Post as an assistant to publisher Donald Graham, creating its online edition. From 1978 to 1980, Rogoff was a special assistant to the director of the Office of Management and Budget in the Carter administration.

Rogoff first went to Alaska in 2002. She was introduced to Alaska by Theron "Terry" Smith, a former chief pilot for Alaska Airlines. With Smith and his wife, Rogoff traveled around Alaska, meeting its people. She subsequently learned to fly an airplane herself. While visiting the Smiths, she bought a home in Anchorage. Rogoff became the majority owner of the Alaska Dispatch in 2008. In April 2014, it was announced that Rogoff and the Alaska Dispatch would purchase the Anchorage Daily News, the largest newspaper in Alaska by circulation, for US$34 million. The transaction placed Alaska's largest newspaper under the control of Rogoff and the Alaska Dispatch. She announced in 2017 that she was giving up control of the newspaper and it was being reorganized under Chapter 11 bankruptcy laws.

== Personal life ==
Rogoff wed David Rubenstein, co-founder and co-chief executive officer of The Carlyle Group, in 1983. They have three children, two daughters and a son. The couple divorced on December 8, 2017.

In addition to her business ventures, Rogoff helped found Alaska House New York and the Alaska Native Arts Foundation. Rogoff and her ex-husband have funded the participation by Juneau, Alaska in the Any Given Child program, which promotes arts in education.

In 2014, Rogoff piloted her own plane to track the Iditarod sled race.

In late August, 2015, Rogoff hosted President Barack Obama in her Anchorage home for a private dinner party during the first day of a three-day trip Obama made to Alaska to address global warming. Rogoff has known the Obama family for several years.

On July 3, 2016, Rogoff was the pilot and sole occupant of a Cessna 206 float plane that crashed upon landing in Halibut Cove, Alaska. Her plane was damaged but she was uninjured. She was able to leave the scene of the crash on her own.
