= Aalto Centre, Rovaniemi =

Public buildings complex in Finland

Aalto Centre
- Aalto-keskus
- Interactive map of the Aalto Centre area

General information
- Architectural style: Modernism
- Location: Rovaniemi, Finland
- Coordinates: 66.496941°N 25.722974°E
- Construction started: 1960
- Completed: 1986

Design and construction
- Architect: Alvar Aalto

The Aalto Centre (Finnish: Aalto-keskus) is an urban area milieu in the city of Rovaniemi, in the Finnish Lapland, designed by the renowned Finnish architect Alvar Aalto, comprising the city's key administrative and cultural buildings.

== Background ==
Up to 90% of Rovaniemi's building stock was destroyed during the Lapland War by the retreating German forces, necessitating the rebuilding of the city centre. In January 1945, Rovaniemi commissioned a new urban design from the Finnish Association of Architects rebuilding unit, with the design work headed by Alvar Aalto.

Aalto's eventual design, approved in 1946, is called Poronsarvikaava lit. 'Reindeer Antler Plan', and incorporates five arterial roads forming the shape of a reindeer antler. In 1960, when Rovaniemi was granted its city charter, the formal decision was made to implement Aalto's plan.

At the centre of the design, the complex of Aalto-designed public and administrative buildings is known as 'Aalto Centre'.

The complex has been designated and protected by the Finnish Heritage Agency as a nationally important built cultural environment (Valtakunnallisesti merkittävä rakennettu kulttuuriympäristö).

The Rovaniemi cityscape is one of two urban plans designed by Aalto which were eventually completed; the other being that in Seinäjoki.

== Key buildings ==
Notable Aalto-designed buildings in the centre include:

- Lappia Hall performing arts and conference venue (completed in stages, 1961-1975)
- Central library (1965)
- City hall (1986)

The park surrounding the Aalto Centre also forms an integral part of the milieu.

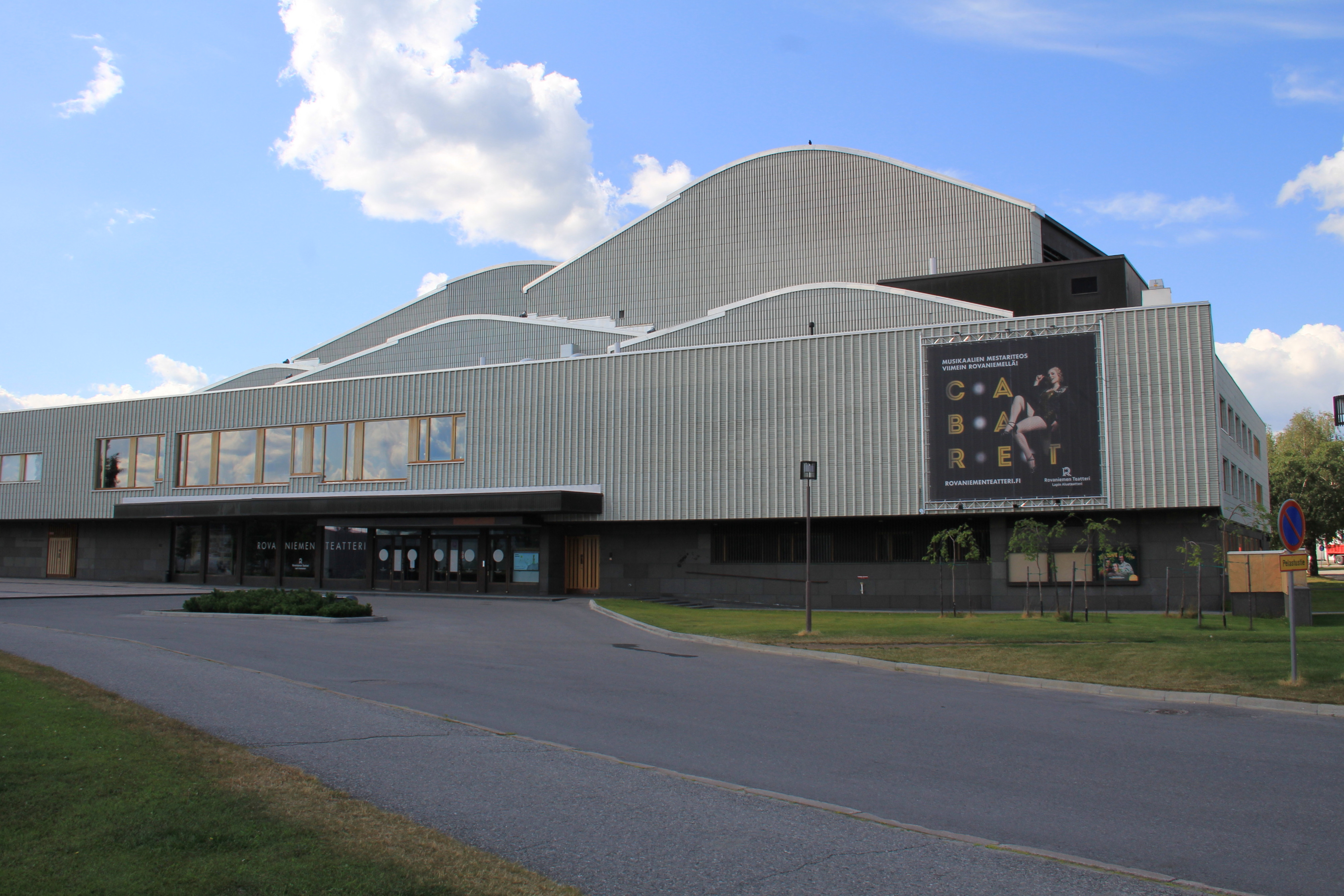
Lappia Hall

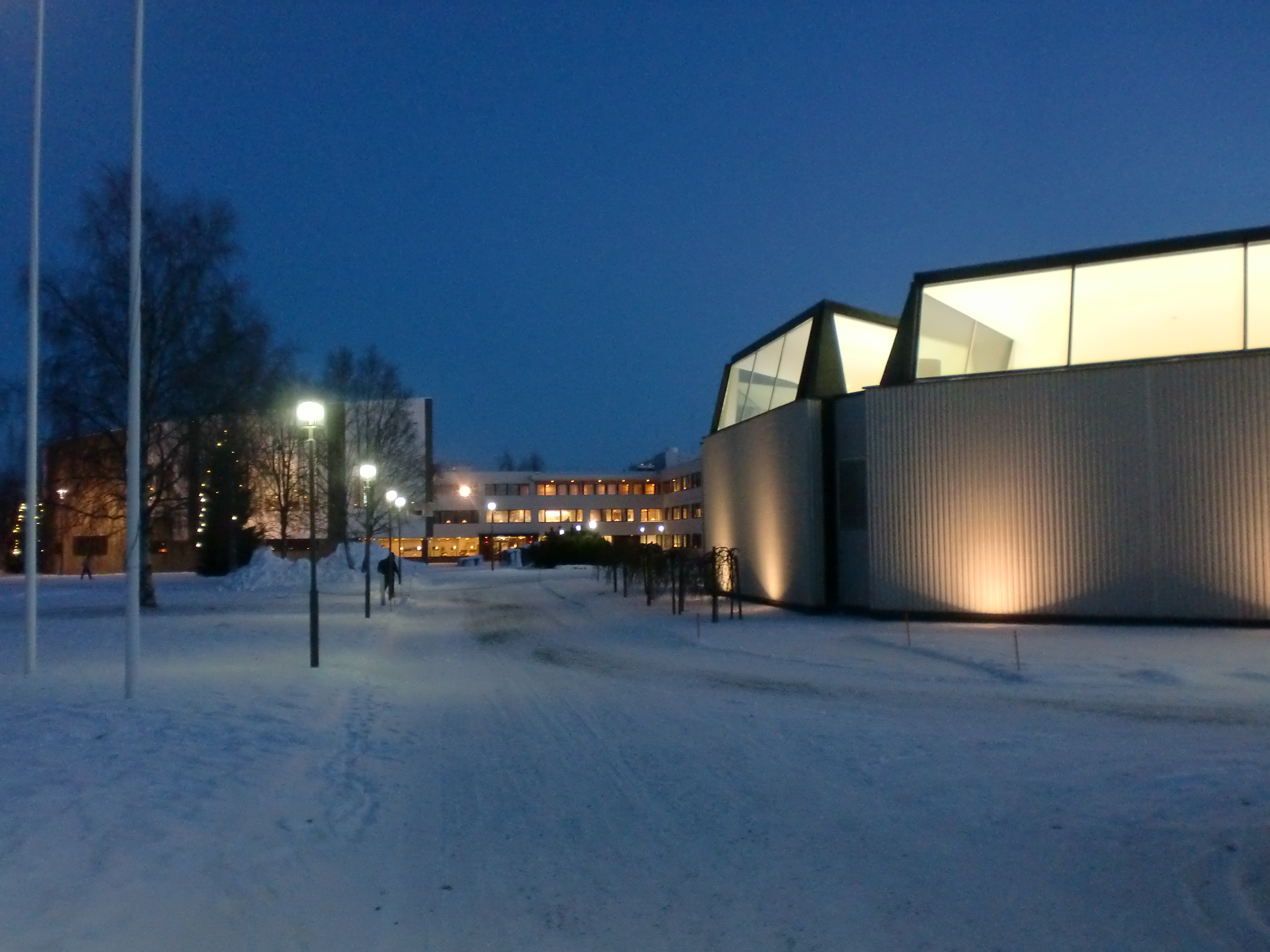
Library

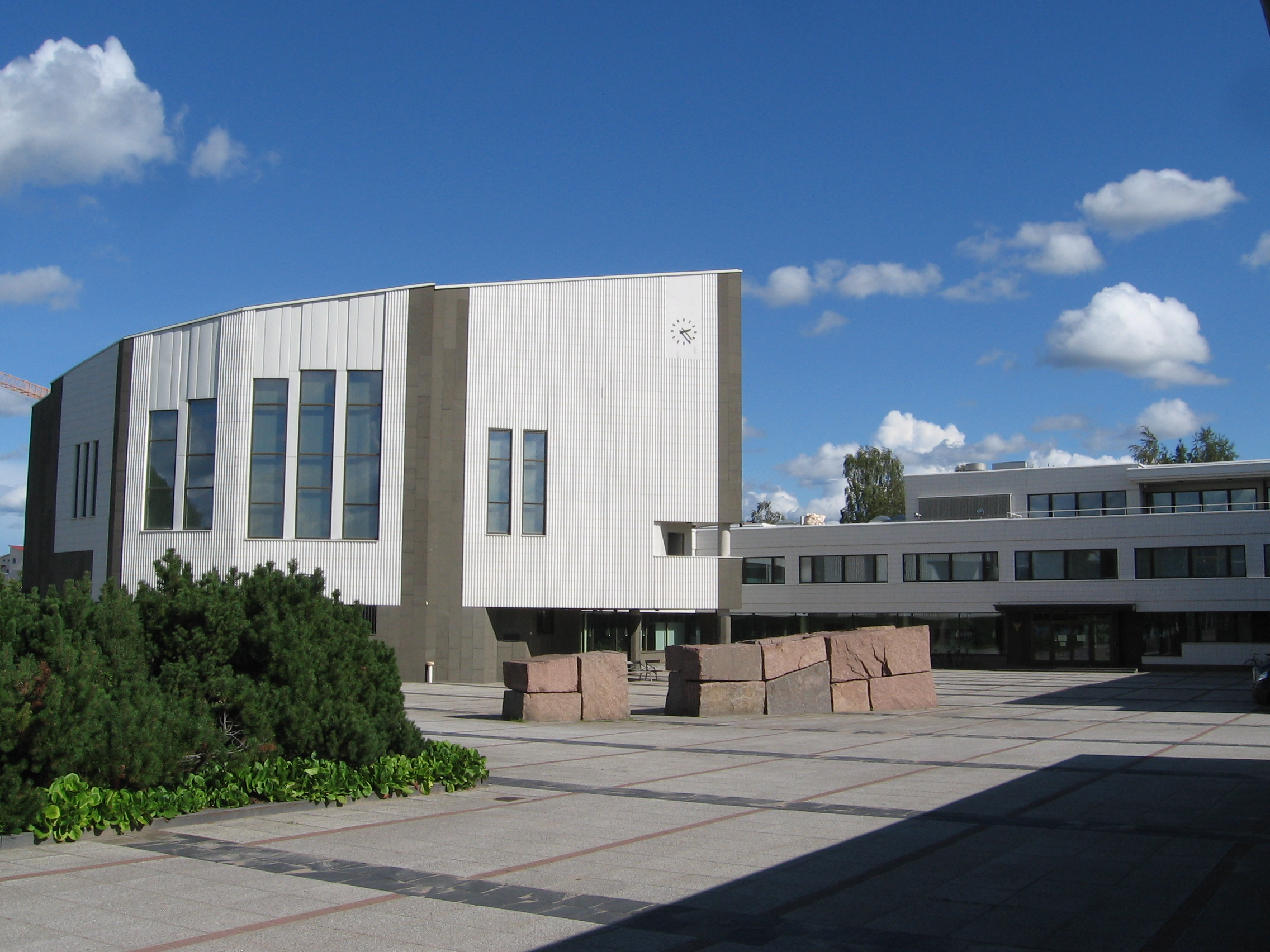
City hall

== See also ==
- Alajärvi administrative centre
- Aalto Centre, Seinäjoki
