= Rovaniemi Library =

Library in Finland

- Rovaniemen kaupunginkirjaston pääkirjasto
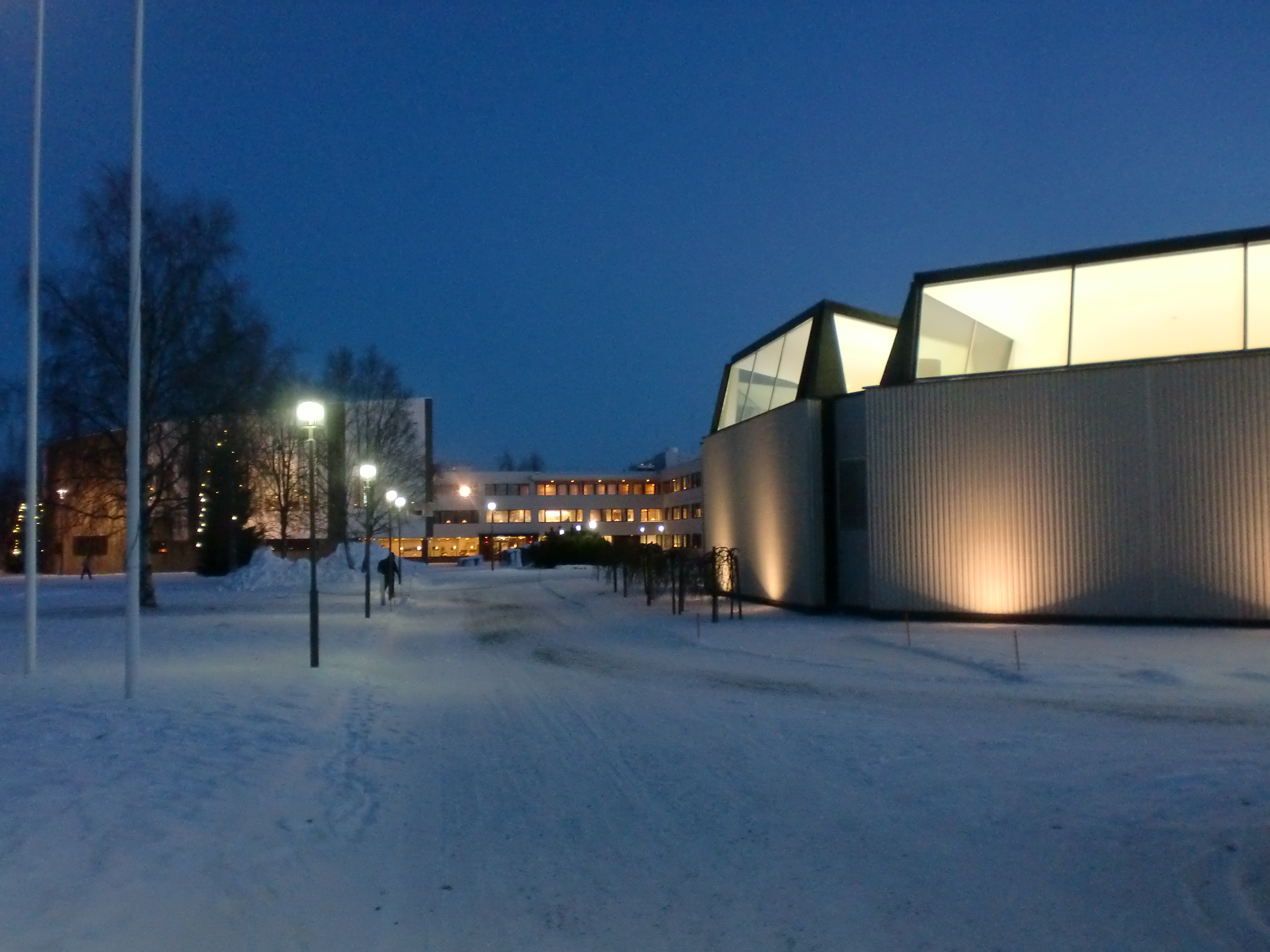
- 66.496537°N 25.722138°E
- Location: Rovaniemi, Finland
- Type: Public library
- Established: 1860; current building 1965
- Branch of: Rovaniemi City Library

Rovaniemi Library is the main municipal public library of the city of Rovaniemi, Finland. The library building is notable for having been designed by the renowned Finnish architect Alvar Aalto.

== History ==
The Rovaniemi public library dates back to 1860.

The building where the library used to operate was, along with up to 90% of Rovaniemi's building stock, destroyed during the Lapland War by the retreating German forces, necessitating the rebuilding of the city centre. In January 1945, Rovaniemi commissioned a new urban design from the Finnish Association of Architects rebuilding unit, with the design work headed by Aalto.

Aalto's eventual design, approved in 1946, is called Poronsarvikaava (literally, "Reindeer Antler Plan"), and incorporates five arterial roads forming the shape of a reindeer antler. At the centre of the plan, a complex of Aalto-designed public and administrative buildings, commonly referred to as 'Aalto Centre', comprises the Lappia Hall arts and conference venue and the Rovaniemi city hall alongside the library. The complex has been designated and protected by the Finnish Heritage Agency as a nationally important built cultural environment (Valtakunnallisesti merkittävä rakennettu kulttuuriympäristö).

The library building was completed in 1965.

== Architecture ==
The overall layout of the building consists of a long, rectangular office wing, and a central, fan-shaped area housing the main lending section and reading areas. The reading areas are situated in a lower-level, recessed 'reading well', a signature feature of many of Aalto's library designs. The fan-shaped section has extensive roof lights designed to allow the maximum amount of natural daylight to enter the building, especially falling on the bookshelves positioned along the interior walls.

Much of the public areas is furnished with light fixtures and furniture by Aalto's own furniture and interior design company, Artek.

The exterior roof is clad with copper plates.

== See also ==
- Aalto Centre
- List of libraries in Finland
