= Rovaniemi =

City in Lapland, Finland

Rovaniemi Roavvenjárga (Northern Sami) Ruávinjargâ (Inari Sami) Ruäʹvnjargg (Skolt Sami)
- Municipality
- Rovaniemen kaupunki Rovaniemi stad City of Rovaniemi
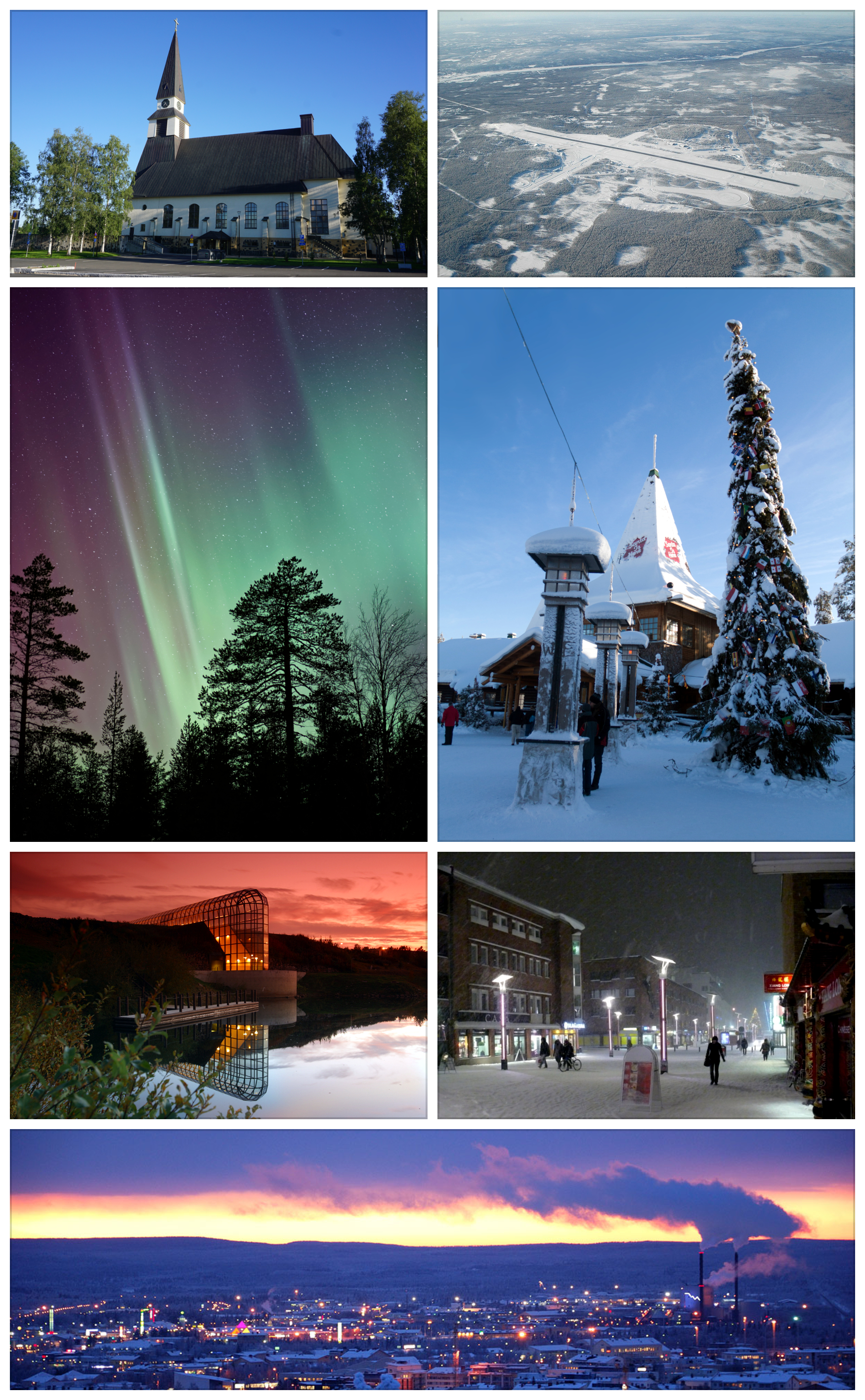
- Clockwise from top: the Rovaniemi Church, the Rovaniemi Airport, the Santa Claus Village, downtown Rovaniemi, a view of the city from Ounasvaara, the Arktikum Science Museum, and aurora borealis in Someroharju.

- Flag Coat of arms
- Nicknames: Arctic Capital; Hometown of Santa Claus; Rollo
- Location of Rovaniemi in Finland
- OpenStreetMap Interactive map outlining Rovaniemi.
- Interactive map of Rovaniemi
- Coordinates: 66°30′N 025°44′E
- Country: Finland
- Region: Lapland
- Sub-region: Rovaniemi sub-region
- Charter: 1929
- City: 1960

Government
  - City manager: Ulla-Kirsikka Vainio

Area (2018-01-01)
  - Total: 8,016.75 km^{2} (3,095.28 sq mi)
  - Land: 7,581.63 km^{2} (2,927.28 sq mi)
  - Water: 434.75 km^{2} (167.86 sq mi)
  - Rank: 5th largest in Finland

Population (2025-12-31)
  - Total: 66,191
  - Rank: 17th largest in Finland
  - Density: 8.73/km^{2} (22.6/sq mi)
- Demonym: rovaniemeläinen (Finnish)

Population by native language
  - Finnish: 93.2% (official)
  - Swedish: 0.2%
  - Sami: 0.3%
  - Others: 6.2%

Population by age
  - 0 to 14: 16.3%
  - 15 to 64: 63.8%
  - 65 or older: 19.9%
- Time zone: UTC+02:00 (EET)
  - Summer (DST): UTC+03:00 (EEST)
- Website: www.rovaniemi.fi

Rovaniemi (/ˈroʊvəni.əmi/ ROH-və-nee-ə-mee, Finnish: [ˈroʋɑˌnie̯mi]; Northern Sami: Roavvenjárga [ˈro̯ɑvveˌɲaːrːka]; Inari Sami: Ruávinjargâ; Skolt Sami: Ruäʹvnjargg) is a city in Finland and the regional capital of Lapland. It is located near the Arctic Circle in the northern interior of the country. The population of Rovaniemi is approximately 66,000, while the sub-region has a population of approximately 70,000. It is the 17th most populous municipality in Finland, and the 11th most populous urban area in the country.

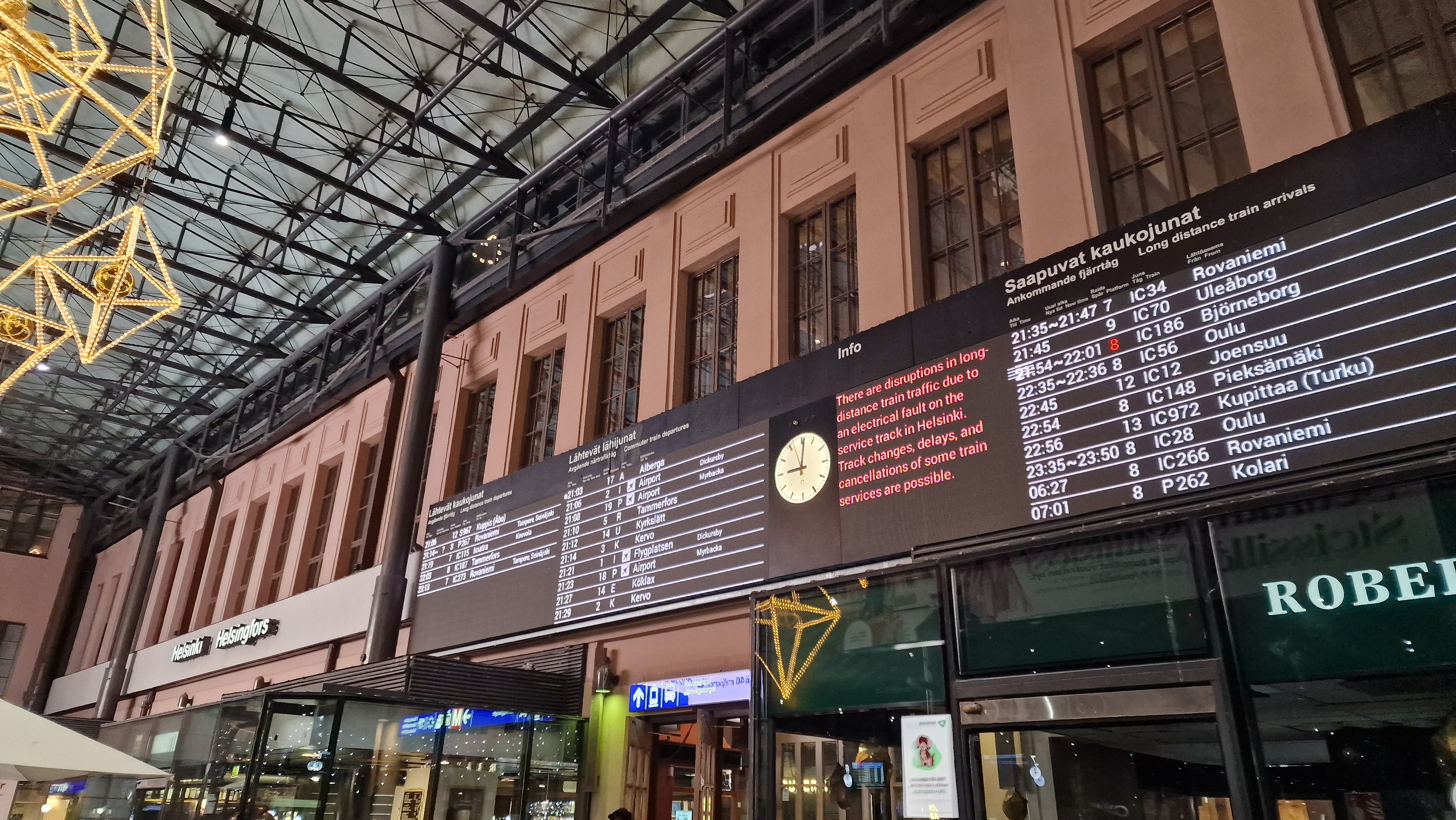
Departure board at Helsinki Central Station for Santa Express sleeper train to Rovaniemi

Rovaniemi is the administrative capital and commercial centre of Finland's northernmost province, Lapland, and its southern part Peräpohjola. The city centre is situated about 6 kilometres (4 miles) south of the Arctic Circle and is between the hills of Ounasvaara and Korkalovaara, at the confluence of the river Kemijoki and its tributary, the Ounasjoki. It is the second-largest city of Northern Finland after Oulu, and, together with the capital city Helsinki, it is one of Finland's most significant tourist cities in terms of foreign tourism. In 2024, CNN listed Rovaniemi as "one of the best places in the world to celebrate Christmas."

The city and the surrounding Rovaniemen maalaiskunta (Rural municipality of Rovaniemi) were consolidated into a single entity on 1 January 2006. Rovaniemi municipality has an approximate population of 66,000. The urban area of Rovaniemi has a population of 53,361, in an area of about 59 km^{2} (23 sq mi). Rovaniemi is a monolingual Finnish-speaking municipality, and unusually for larger Finnish towns, it is also known by its Finnish name and spelling in the Swedish language.

The coat of arms of Rovaniemi was designed by Toivo Vuorela. Its explanation is "in the green field, a silver pall with light-height upper branches; accompanied by a golden flame in the upper corner". It was approved on 15 August 1956 by the Rovaniemi Rural Municipal Council and confirmed on October 26 at the Ministry of the Interior as the coat of arms of the Rovaniemi Rural Council.

== Name ==
The rova part in the name Rovaniemi has often been considered to be of Saami origin, as roavve in Northern Saami denotes a forested ridge or hill or the site of an old forest fire. The niemi part of the name means "cape". The name of the town in the Saami languages spoken in Finland are Inari Sami: Ruávinjargâ, Northern Sami: Roavenjárga and Roavvenjárga and Skolt Sami: Ruäʹvnjargg.

== History ==
Periodic clearance of new land for agriculture and the practice of slash-and-burn cultivation began around 750–530 BC. Artifacts found in the area suggest that an increasing number of travellers from Karelia in the east, Häme in the south and the Arctic Ocean coast in the north must have come there from 500 AD onwards. The Sami are indigenous to Sápmi.

Rovaniemi is first mentioned by name in official documents in 1453, existing as a set of small villages whose inhabitants earned their living mainly in agriculture and animal husbandry—with fishing and hunting the most important offshoots.

The exploitation of Lapland's natural resources in the 1800s boosted Rovaniemi's growth. Extensive logging sites and gold fever attracted thousands of people to Lapland. As the mining of natural resources was increased, Rovaniemi became the business centre of the province of Lapland.

The township decree was promulgated on 27 June 1928, as a result of which Rovaniemi seceded from the old rural municipality as its own market town on 1 January 1929.

=== World War II ===
Following the Winter War of 1939–1940, Finland increasingly developed military cooperation with Nazi Germany. Under a transit agreement concluded in 1940, German troops and military supplies were permitted to travel through Finland to German-occupied northern Norway. The transit route passed through Rovaniemi, where German logistical, communications and intelligence units began establishing facilities before Finland again entered war with the Soviet Union. A German Luftwaffe command organisation, Fliegerführer Nord, transferred its headquarters to Rovaniemi in December 1940, and by February 1941 the Germans had begun expanding the existing transit organisation into a major military supply centre.

Rebuilding Rovaniemi in 1949

After the outbreak of the Continuation War in June 1941, German forces were given operational responsibility for much of northern Finland. Rovaniemi became the headquarters of the German Mountain Army command in Finland, later the 20th Mountain Army, and developed into the principal German military and logistical centre in Finnish Lapland. The army headquarters, field hospitals, supply organisations and more than 60 German staffs were located in the town and surrounding area. The resulting military presence increased the population present in Rovaniemi from approximately 7,500 to 13,500. Historian Pekka Kujamäki has described wartime Rovaniemi as the "most significant German centre in all of Finland".

Rovaniemi Airport also became an important German military installation. The recently completed Finnish airfield was placed at the disposal of German forces from 1 July 1941, although Luftwaffe personnel and reconnaissance aircraft had already been operating in the area before that date. The Germans greatly expanded the airfield, building hangars, barracks, workshops, ammunition stores, aircraft dispersal areas and anti-aircraft positions. By January 1943 the airfield complex contained at least 31 aircraft hangars, about 120 accommodation and office barracks and 24 large storage buildings.

The German military presence also included prisoner-of-war and forced-labour systems. Alongside paid Finnish civilian workers, German construction, forestry and logistical operations in Lapland used Soviet prisoners of war and labourers brought from German-occupied Europe. A branch of the German Stalag 309 prisoner-of-war system was established at Rovaniemi in September 1941, and other prisoner and labour camps operated in the area. A Finnish liaison report from January 1943 recorded approximately 500 prisoners of war available for work at the Rovaniemi airfield, in addition to Dutch labour-service personnel and paid Finnish workers.

Relations between the German military and Finnish civilian authorities were generally organised as cooperation between the two countries rather than as an occupation: Finnish civil administration remained in place, while German forces maintained their own military command and legal structures. The large German presence nevertheless had a considerable effect on local life and employment. German units employed thousands of Finnish civilians in northern Finland in construction, transport, forestry, maintenance, hospitals, kitchens and other support work.

Finland agreed to a ceasefire with the Soviet Union in September 1944 and signed the Moscow Armistice on 19 September. Under its terms Finland was required to remove German forces from its territory, leading to the Lapland War. Anticipating fighting, the Finnish authorities ordered the evacuation of Lapland. Evacuation from Rovaniemi began on 16 September and was largely completed by 22 September.

As German forces withdrew north towards Norway, they adopted a scorched earth policy intended to deny roads, bridges, buildings and other infrastructure to the pursuing Finnish forces. The German destruction of Rovaniemi began in October 1944. By the time German forces withdrew, 548 homes, 96 private commercial buildings and nine public buildings had been destroyed, amounting to an estimated 90 per cent of the town's property. Fires and the destruction of the largely wooden town left relatively few pre-war buildings standing.

Reconstruction began soon afterwards. In 1945 Alvar Aalto, working through the reconstruction office of the Finnish Association of Architects, prepared a new town plan for Rovaniemi. His well-known Poronsarvikaava ("reindeer antler plan") arranged the principal roads and green spaces in a pattern resembling the head and antlers of a reindeer.

== Geography ==
=== Climate ===
Rovaniemi

Climate chart (precipitation, max. and min. temperature)
J	F	M	A	M	J	J	A	S	O	N	D
42 −8 −15	34 −8 −14	36 −3 −9	31 4 −4	36 11 2	59 17 7	69 20 11	72 17 9	54 10 4	55 3 −1	49 −3 −8	42 −6 −13
- █ Average max. and min. temperatures in °C
- █ Precipitation totals in mm
- Source: World Meteorological Organization
Imperial conversion
J	F	M	A	M	J	J	A	S	O	N	D
1.7 17 6	1.3 18 7	1.4 27 15	1.2 38 25	1.4 51 36	2.3 62 45	2.7 67 52	2.8 62 48	2.1 51 40	2.1 38 30	1.9 27 18	1.6 20 10
- █ Average max. and min. temperatures in °F
- █ Precipitation totals in inches

Due to its location near the Arctic Circle, Rovaniemi has a subarctic climate (Köppen Dfc) with short, pleasant summers with occasional very warm days above 28°C (82°F), while the winters are long, freezing cold and snowy. The city lies just south of the 0 °C (32 °F) mean annual isotherm, but freezing in the soil is very limited even during the winter due to typical heavy snow cover. There is insignificant seasonal variation in precipitation, but a slight trend for wettest conditions in the summer months.

Its extreme northerly location combined with frequent overcast skies leads to very low levels of sunshine in the winter months; December averages just under six minutes of sunshine daily. The "midnight sun" is above the horizon from 7 June to 6 July (30 days).

Winters are somewhat modified by marine air from the North Atlantic Current that ensures average temperatures are less extreme than expected for an inland area at such a northerly latitude. Nevertheless, Rovaniemi still has colder winters than areas at similar latitudes in Norway or Sweden.

On 26 April 2019, Rovaniemi recorded its warmest April day on record with 19 °C (66 °F).

Climate data for Rovaniemi Lentoasema, elevation: 196m (1991-2020) Extremes (1959-present)
Month	Jan	Feb	Mar	Apr	May	Jun	Jul	Aug	Sep	Oct	Nov	Dec	Year
Record high °C (°F)	6.1 (43.0)	5.8 (42.4)	9.5 (49.1)	19.0 (66.2)	28.2 (82.8)	30.7 (87.3)	32.2 (90.0)	29.1 (84.4)	22.6 (72.7)	15.6 (60.1)	8.7 (47.7)	5.0 (41.0)	32.2 (90.0)
Mean maximum °C (°F)	1.0 (33.8)	1.5 (34.7)	5.1 (41.2)	11.5 (52.7)	21.1 (70.0)	24.7 (76.5)	26.4 (79.5)	24.2 (75.6)	18.0 (64.4)	10.0 (50.0)	3.9 (39.0)	2.1 (35.8)	27.3 (81.1)
Mean daily maximum °C (°F)	−7.3 (18.9)	−7.3 (18.9)	−1.9 (28.6)	4.1 (39.4)	11.0 (51.8)	17.0 (62.6)	20.1 (68.2)	17.2 (63.0)	11.1 (52.0)	3.1 (37.6)	−2.1 (28.2)	−4.9 (23.2)	5.0 (41.0)
Daily mean °C (°F)	−10.3 (13.5)	−10.3 (13.5)	−5.6 (21.9)	0.1 (32.2)	6.5 (43.7)	12.5 (54.5)	15.6 (60.1)	13.1 (55.6)	7.7 (45.9)	0.8 (33.4)	−4.4 (24.1)	−7.7 (18.1)	1.5 (34.7)
Mean daily minimum °C (°F)	−13.5 (7.7)	−13.3 (8.1)	−9.1 (15.6)	−3.4 (25.9)	2.5 (36.5)	8.5 (47.3)	11.8 (53.2)	9.6 (49.3)	4.9 (40.8)	−1.3 (29.7)	−6.7 (19.9)	−10.6 (12.9)	−1.7 (28.9)
Mean minimum °C (°F)	−25.9 (−14.6)	−24.5 (−12.1)	−18.6 (−1.5)	−11.4 (11.5)	−3.1 (26.4)	2.6 (36.7)	6.7 (44.1)	3.7 (38.7)	−1.2 (29.8)	−10.4 (13.3)	−16.7 (1.9)	−22.2 (−8.0)	−27.8 (−18.0)
Record low °C (°F)	−38.1 (−36.6)	−35.0 (−31.0)	−27.5 (−17.5)	−18.7 (−1.7)	−11.0 (12.2)	−2.6 (27.3)	2.4 (36.3)	−0.6 (30.9)	−7.7 (18.1)	−21.5 (−6.7)	−27.9 (−18.2)	−32.9 (−27.2)	−38.1 (−36.6)
Average precipitation mm (inches)	46 (1.8)	37 (1.5)	37 (1.5)	34 (1.3)	48 (1.9)	64 (2.5)	81 (3.2)	68 (2.7)	60 (2.4)	54 (2.1)	55 (2.2)	51 (2.0)	633 (24.9)
Average snowfall cm (inches)	57 (22)	73 (29)	75 (30)	27 (11)	0 (0)	0 (0)	0 (0)	0 (0)	0 (0)	1 (0.4)	19 (7.5)	38 (15)	290 (114)
Average precipitation days	11	10	8	8	8	10	10	9	9	10	13	12	118
Mean monthly sunshine hours	15	57	132	203	237	271	260	182	112	60	18	3	1,550
Source 1: Ilmatieteen laitos
Source 2: FMI

Climate data for Rovaniemi Apukka, elevation: 106m (1991-2020) Extremes (1959-present)
Month	Jan	Feb	Mar	Apr	May	Jun	Jul	Aug	Sep	Oct	Nov	Dec	Year
Record high °C (°F)	7.9 (46.2)	7.1 (44.8)	10.6 (51.1)	17.2 (63.0)	28.8 (83.8)	31.2 (88.2)	31.2 (88.2)	29.8 (85.6)	23.3 (73.9)	14.0 (57.2)	8.5 (47.3)	6.2 (43.2)	31.2 (88.2)
Mean daily maximum °C (°F)	−7.4 (18.7)	−7 (19)	−1.1 (30.0)	4.6 (40.3)	11.5 (52.7)	17.4 (63.3)	20.5 (68.9)	17.7 (63.9)	11.8 (53.2)	3.7 (38.7)	−1.7 (28.9)	−4.9 (23.2)	5.4 (41.7)
Daily mean °C (°F)	−11.7 (10.9)	−11.6 (11.1)	−6.6 (20.1)	−0.2 (31.6)	6.4 (43.5)	12.5 (54.5)	15.5 (59.9)	12.9 (55.2)	7.6 (45.7)	0.8 (33.4)	−4.5 (23.9)	−8.6 (16.5)	1 (34)
Mean daily minimum °C (°F)	−17 (1)	−17.2 (1.0)	−12.9 (8.8)	−5.5 (22.1)	1.1 (34.0)	7.1 (44.8)	10.2 (50.4)	8 (46)	3.6 (38.5)	−2.1 (28.2)	−7.8 (18.0)	−13.2 (8.2)	−3.8 (25.2)
Record low °C (°F)	−47.5 (−53.5)	−44.3 (−47.7)	−40.4 (−40.7)	−31.6 (−24.9)	−14.7 (5.5)	−3.7 (25.3)	−1.5 (29.3)	−4.1 (24.6)	−11.0 (12.2)	−28.6 (−19.5)	−34.4 (−29.9)	−39.3 (−38.7)	−47.5 (−53.5)
Average precipitation mm (inches)	39 (1.5)	30 (1.2)	29 (1.1)	30 (1.2)	43 (1.7)	58 (2.3)	75 (3.0)	59 (2.3)	55 (2.2)	49 (1.9)	48 (1.9)	42 (1.7)	555 (21.9)
Average precipitation days	10	9	8	8	8	10	10	9	9	10	12	11	114
Source 1: Ilmatieteen laitos
Source 2: FMI

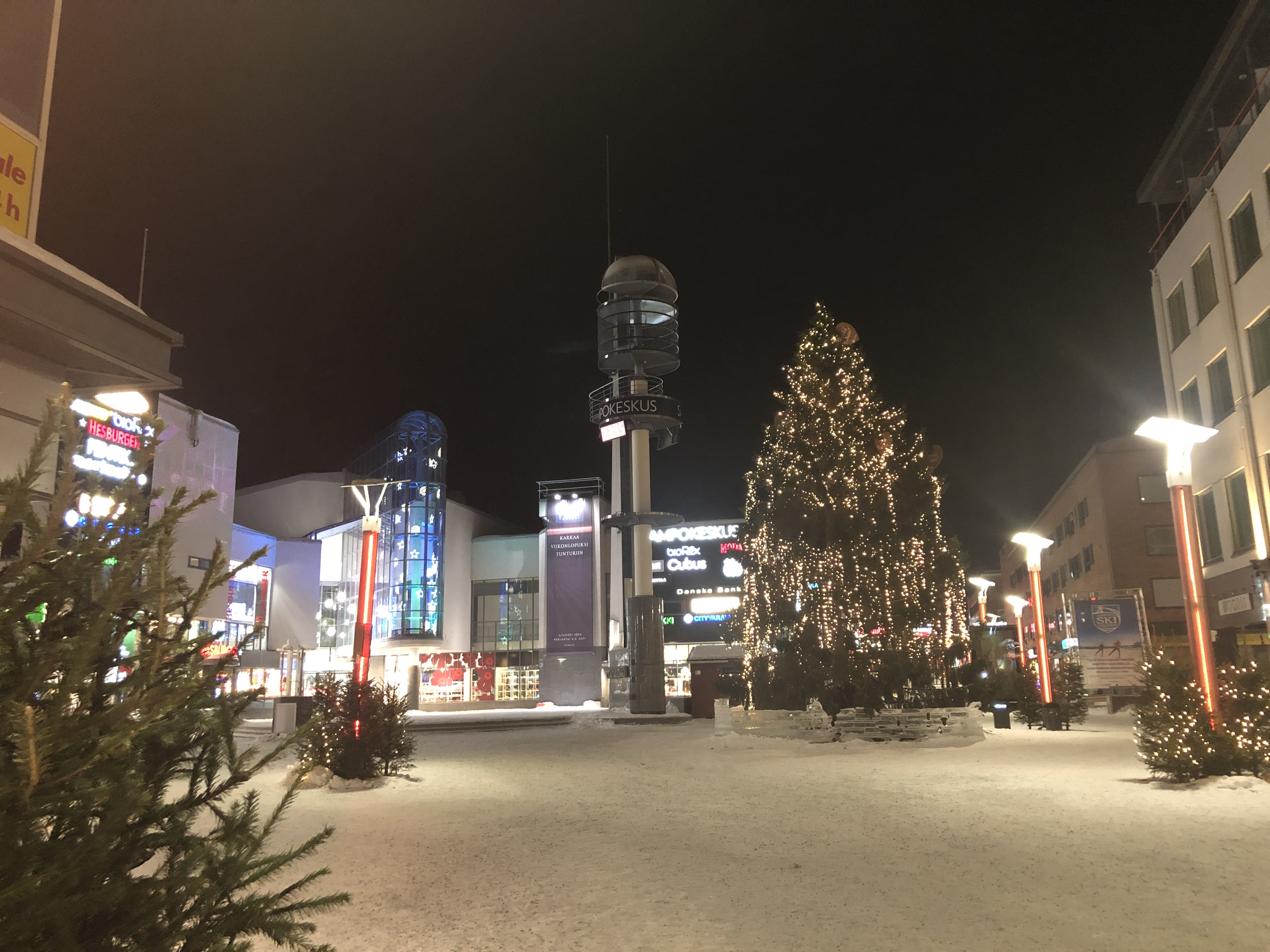
Rovaniemi's Lordi's Square in February 2020

The average annual temperature in Rovaniemi is 0.9 °C (33.6 °F). Snow stays on the ground 175 days a year on average. The lowest temperature ever recorded at the airport is −38.1 °C (−37 °F), recorded on 28 January 1999. However, on the same day temperatures as cold as -47.5 C were recorded at nearby weather stations. The highest temperature ever recorded is 32.2 °C (90 °F), recorded on 18 July 2018 at the railway station.

Despite the fact that Rovaniemi experiences polar day between 7 June and 6 July (30 days) it does not experience polar night. However, the sun barely gets above the horizon in the winter.

=== Populated places ===
Some of the neighborhoods are former rural villages, and the longest distance from said neighborhoods to the city center (a.k.a. "Rovaniemi proper") can be estimated to almost a hundred kilometers apart:

- Alakorkalo
- Ala-Nampa
- Auttinseutu
- Hirvas
- Jaatila
- Juotasniemi
- Karvonranta
- Katajaranta
- Kauko
- Kiiruna
- Kivitaipale
- Kolpene
- Korkalovaara
- Koskenkylä
- Lehtojärvi
- Leipee
- Lohiniva
- Marrasjärvi
- Marraskoski
- Meltaus
- Misi
- Muurola
- Narkaus
- Niesi
- Nivankylä
- Nivavaara
- Norvajärvi
- Oikarainen
- Ojanperä
- Olkkajärvi
- Ounasrinne
- Paavalniemi
- Patokoski
- Pekkala
- Perunkajärvi
- Petäjäinen
- Pisa
- Pullinranta
- Pöykkölä
- Rantaviiri
- Rautiosaari
- Ruikka
- Saarenkylä
- Sinettä
- Santamäki
- Sonka
- Syväsenvaara
- Tapionkylä
- Tennilä
- Teollisuuskylä
- Tiainen
- Tuhnaja
- Vaarala
- Vanttausjärvi
- Vanttauskoski
- Vennivaara
- Viiri
- Vikajärvi
- Välijoki
- Ylikylä
- Yli-Nampa

== Demographics ==
=== Population ===
Historical population
Year	Pop.	±% p.a.
1930	5,442	—
1940	6,685	+2.08%
1972	45,767	+6.20%
1980	48,056	+0.61%
1990	54,014	+1.18%
2000	57,253	+0.58%
2010	60,090	+0.48%
2020	63,528	+0.56%
2025	66,102	+0.80%
Source: Tilastollinen päätoimisto, Statistics Finland (1972-2020)

The city of Rovaniemi has 66,191 inhabitants, making it the 17th most populous city in Finland. The Rovaniemi region has a population of 69,721.

Population size 1990–2025
Year	Population
1990	54,014
1995	57,045
2000	57,253
2005	57,835
2010	60,090
2015	61,838
2020	63,528
2025	66,191

=== Languages ===
Population by
mother tongue (2025)
1. Finnish (93.2%)
2. Ukrainian (0.80%)
3. Russian (0.80%)
4. English (0.50%)
5. Chinese (0.40%)
6. Sami (0.30%)
7. Arabic (0.30%)
8. Other (3.70%)

Rovaniemi is a monolingual Finnish-speaking municipality. The majority of the population, 61,713 persons (93.2%), spoke Finnish as their first language. In addition, the number of Swedish speakers was 144 persons (0.2%) of the population. Foreign languages were spoken by 6.2% of the population. The number of Sámi speakers was 221 persons (0.3%) of the population. As English and Swedish are compulsory school subjects, functional bilingualism or trilingualism acquired through language studies is not uncommon.

At least 40 different languages are spoken in Rovaniemi. The most common foreign languages are Ukrainian (0.8%), Russian (0.8%), English (0.5%) and Chinese (0.4%).

=== Immigration ===
Population by country of birth (2025)
Country of birth	Population	%
Finland	61,330	92.6
Sweden	802	1.2
Ukraine	333	0.5
China	242	0.4
Philippines	217	0.3
Russia	200	0.3
Thailand	143	0.2
Iraq	135	0.2
Somalia	92	0.1
Other	1,798	2.7

As of 2024, there were 3,778 persons with a migrant background living in Rovaniemi, or 6% of the population. (Note: Statistics Finland classifies a person as having a "foreign background" if both parents or the only known parent were born abroad.) The number of residents who were born abroad was 4,367, or 7% of the population. The number of persons with foreign citizenship living in Rovaniemi was 2,886. Most foreign-born citizens came from Sweden, Ukraine, China and Russia.

The relative share of immigrants in Rovaniemi's population is below to the national average. However, the city's new residents are increasingly of foreign origin. This will increase the proportion of foreign residents in the coming years.

=== Religion ===
In 2023, the Evangelical Lutheran Church was the largest religious group with 69.1% of the population of Rovaniemi. Other religious groups accounted for 1.6% of the population. 29.3% of the population had no religious affiliation.

Of the revival movements within the church, Conservative Laestadianism is particularly active in the locality, with three peace associations in the locality: the Rovaniemi Peace Association, the Rautionsaari Peace Association and the Viirinkylä Peace Association.

Other local communities include the Rovaniemi Pentecostal Church, a member of the Finnish Pentecostal Church, and the Rovaniemi Adventist Church, part of the Finnish Adventist Church.

== Economy ==
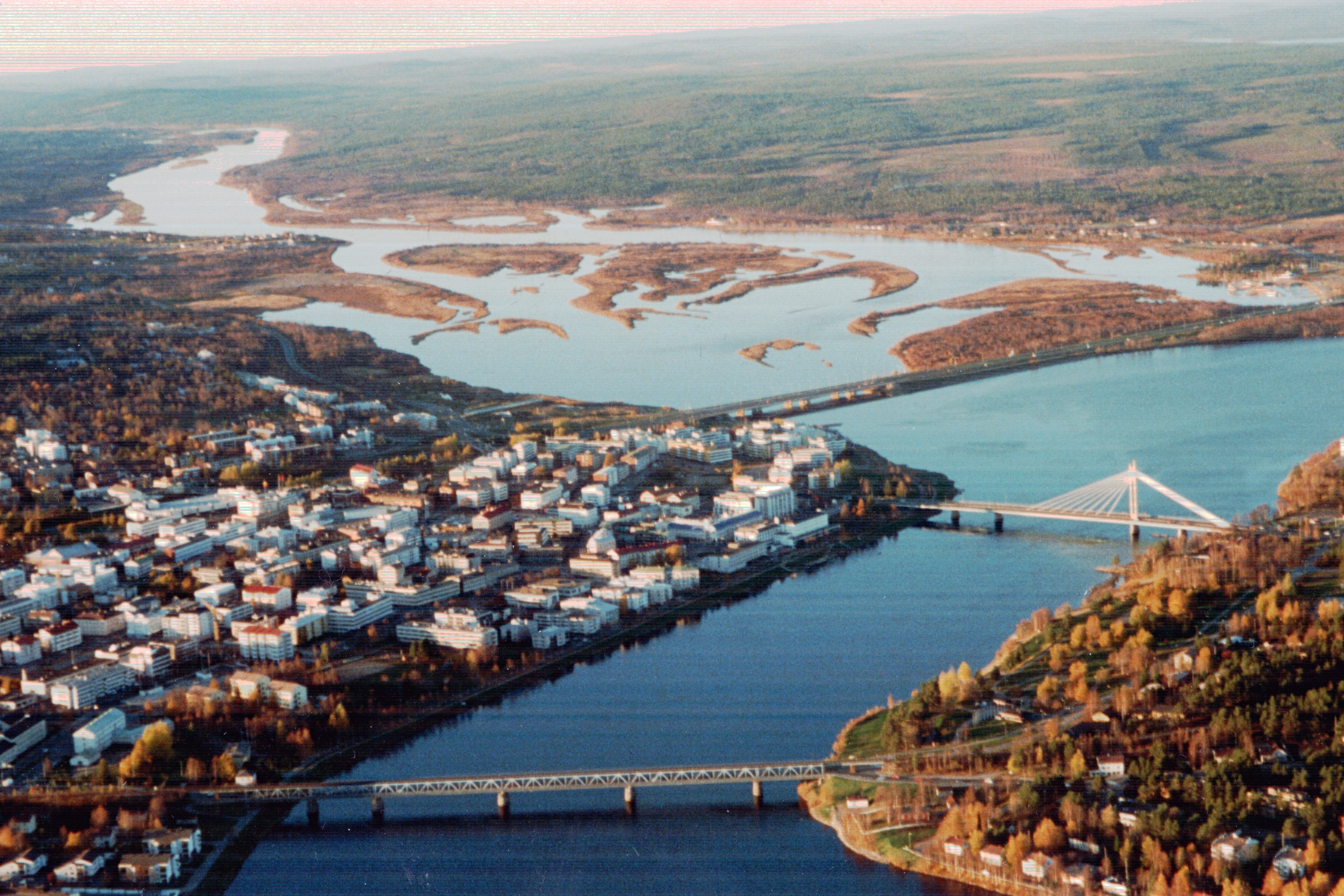
Rovaniemi in 1999

Since Rovaniemi is the capital of the region of Lapland, many government institutions have their offices there. About 10,000 of the inhabitants are students. Rovaniemi is home to not only the University of Lapland but also the Lapland University of Applied Sciences (formerly known as the Rovaniemi Polytechnic), which comprises institutes of information and traditional technology, business, health and social care, culinary studies, forestry, rural studies, and sports. Local newspapers include the Lapin Kansa, Uusi Rovaniemi and Lappilainen.

=== Tourism ===
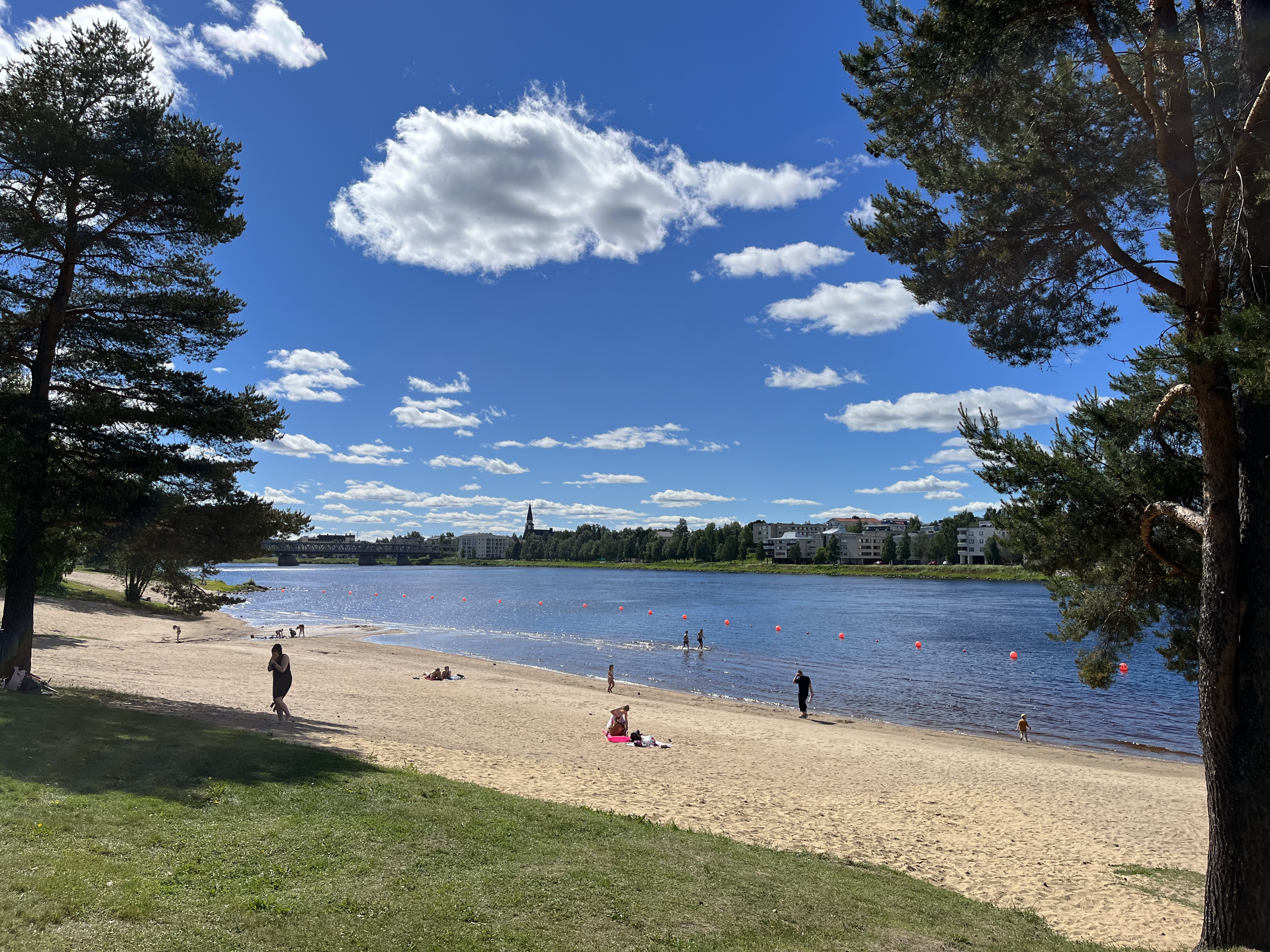
Summer in Rovaniemi, which includes the Midnight sun

Because of the unspoiled nature of the area and numerous recreational opportunities, tourism is an important industry in Rovaniemi. The city has a number of hotels and restaurants located both in the centre and on the outskirts of the town, hosting over 481,000 visitors in 2013. Tourism can be seen and heard in the city's streetscape, at the Arctic Circle and at Rovaniemi Airport, one of Finland's busiest airports in terms of passenger numbers. However, as a mild phenomenon, popularity of the city has also brought overtourism, from which the locals suffer.

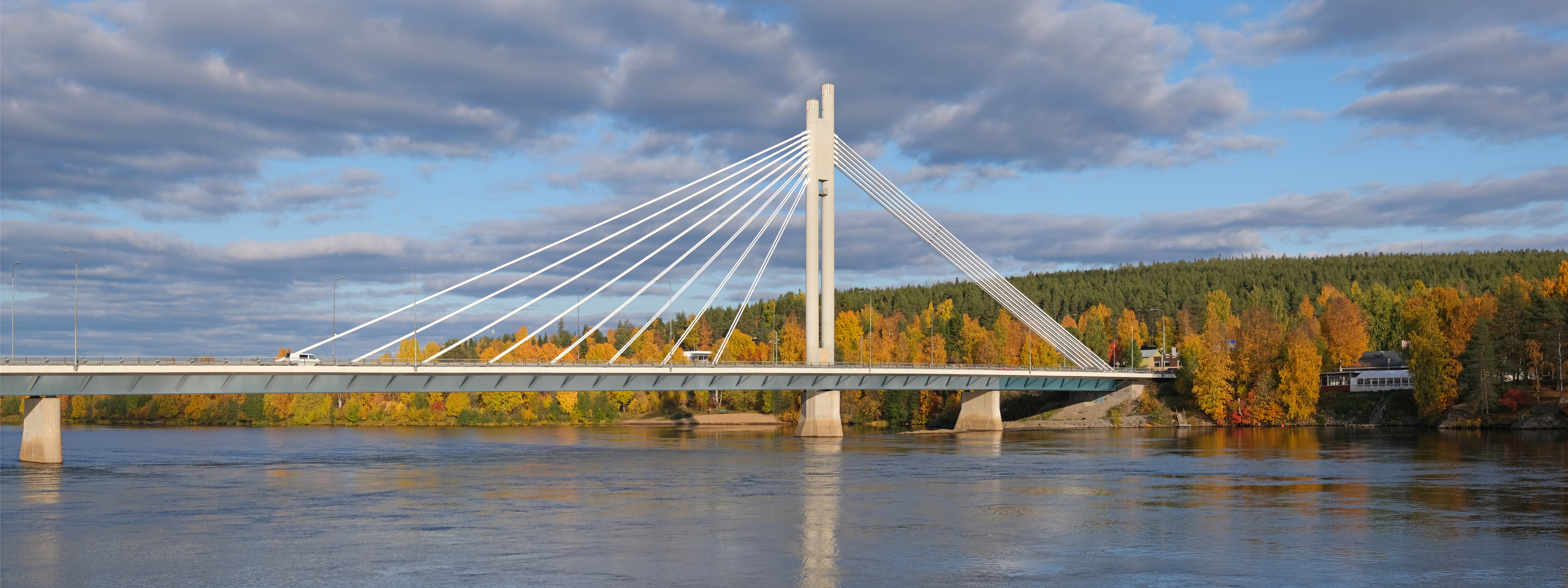
Jätkänkynttilä - Swedish torch Bridge

Rovaniemi is also considered by Finns to be the official home town of Santa Claus. The city registered the slogan as trademark in 2009. In 2025, an invalidation request was filed at the European Union Intellectual Property Office (EUIPO), arguing the trademark is descriptive and potentially deceptive. It is home to the Santa Claus Village at the Arctic Circle and SantaPark Arctic World, which is located 8 km (5 mi) north of the centre.

Directly across the river from the town is the Ounasvaara ski centre. There have been recreational activities in the Ounasvaara area since 1927, when the first winter sports were also organized. The top of the Ounasvaara hill bears the site of some of the earliest known human settlements in the area.

A phenomenon also attracting numerous tourists is the Aurora Borealis or Northern Lights. In Finnish Lapland, the number of auroral displays can be as high as 200 a year, whereas in southern Finland, the number is usually fewer than 20.

== Attractions ==
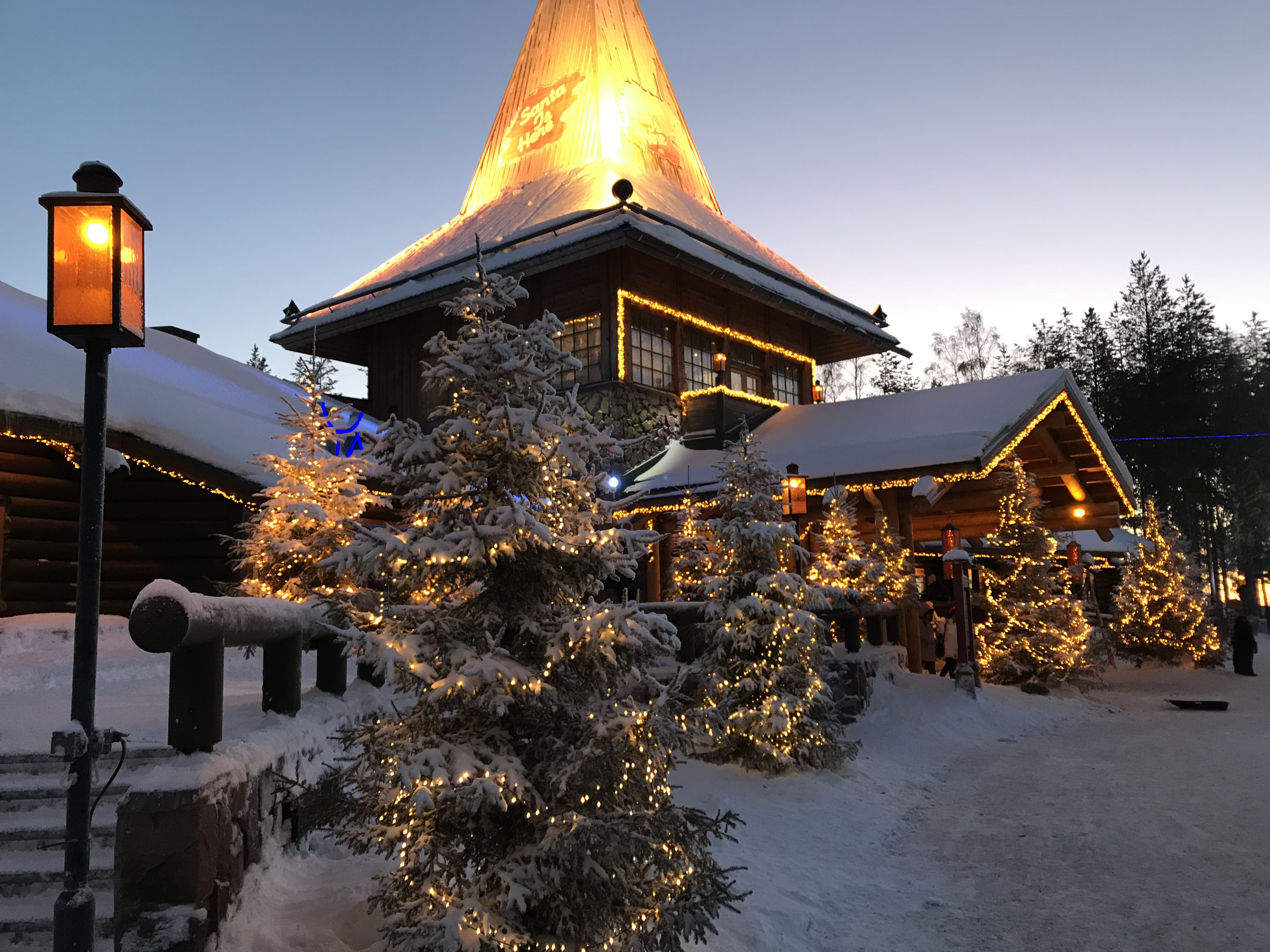
Santa Claus Village

Rovaniemi's most prominent landmarks include the Jätkänkynttilä bridge with its eternal flame over the Kemijoki river, the Arktikum Science Museum, which rises out of the bank of the Ounasjoki river, the Rovaniemi city hall, the Lappia Hall, which serves as a theatre, concert hall, and congress centre, and the library.

The last three mentioned buildings are designed by Alvar Aalto. The Arktikum Science Museum is a comprehensive museum of Finland's, and the world's, Arctic regions.

== Sports ==
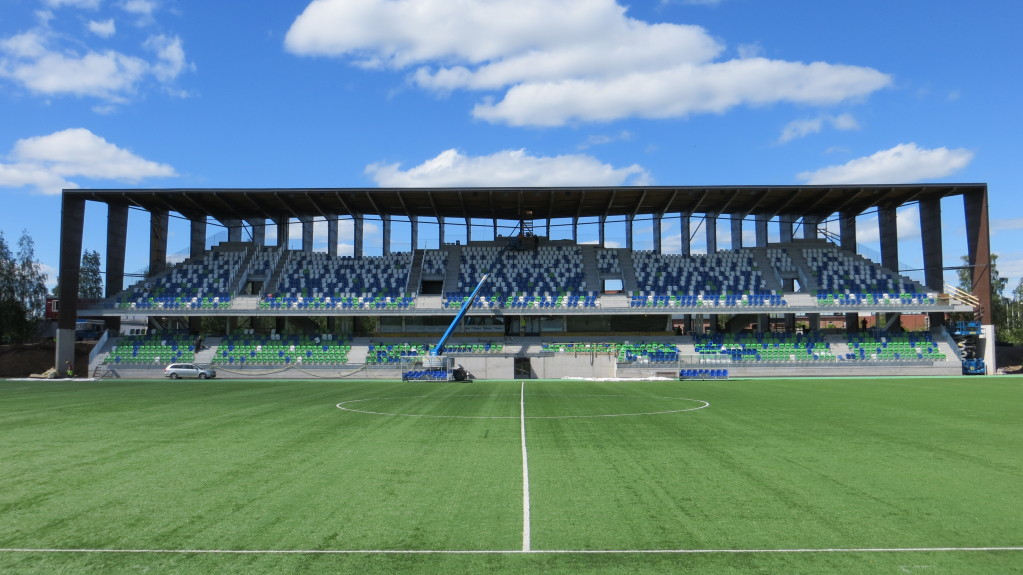
Rovaniemi's Keskuskenttä, home ground of RoPS

The city is home to the football clubs Rovaniemen Palloseura, or RoPS, part of Ykkösliiga, the Finnish second division, and FC Santa Claus, part of the sixth division; to the ice hockey team Rovaniemen Kiekko, or RoKi, whose home arena is Lappi Areena and which competes in Mestis, the second-highest league in Finland; and to the volleyball team called Team Lakkapää (formerly Rovaniemen Santasport and Perungan Pojat), which plays in the Finland Volleyball League and won the national championship in 2003, 2007, 2008 and 2011. The Rovaniemi Nordmen, an American Football team, was formed in 2013 and has played at various levels throughout the Finnish American Football Association.

Rovaniemi has hosted several international ski competition, including the FIS Nordic World Ski Championships 1984, several FIS Nordic Combined World Cup and FIS Ski Jumping Continental Cup events, the 2005 FIS Nordic Junior World Ski Championships, the 1970 Winter Universiade and the 2008 Winter Transplant Games.

In 2021, Rovaniemi hosted the World Rally Championship for 2021 Arctic Rally Finland, the first WRC event held inside the Arctic Circle.

== Transport ==
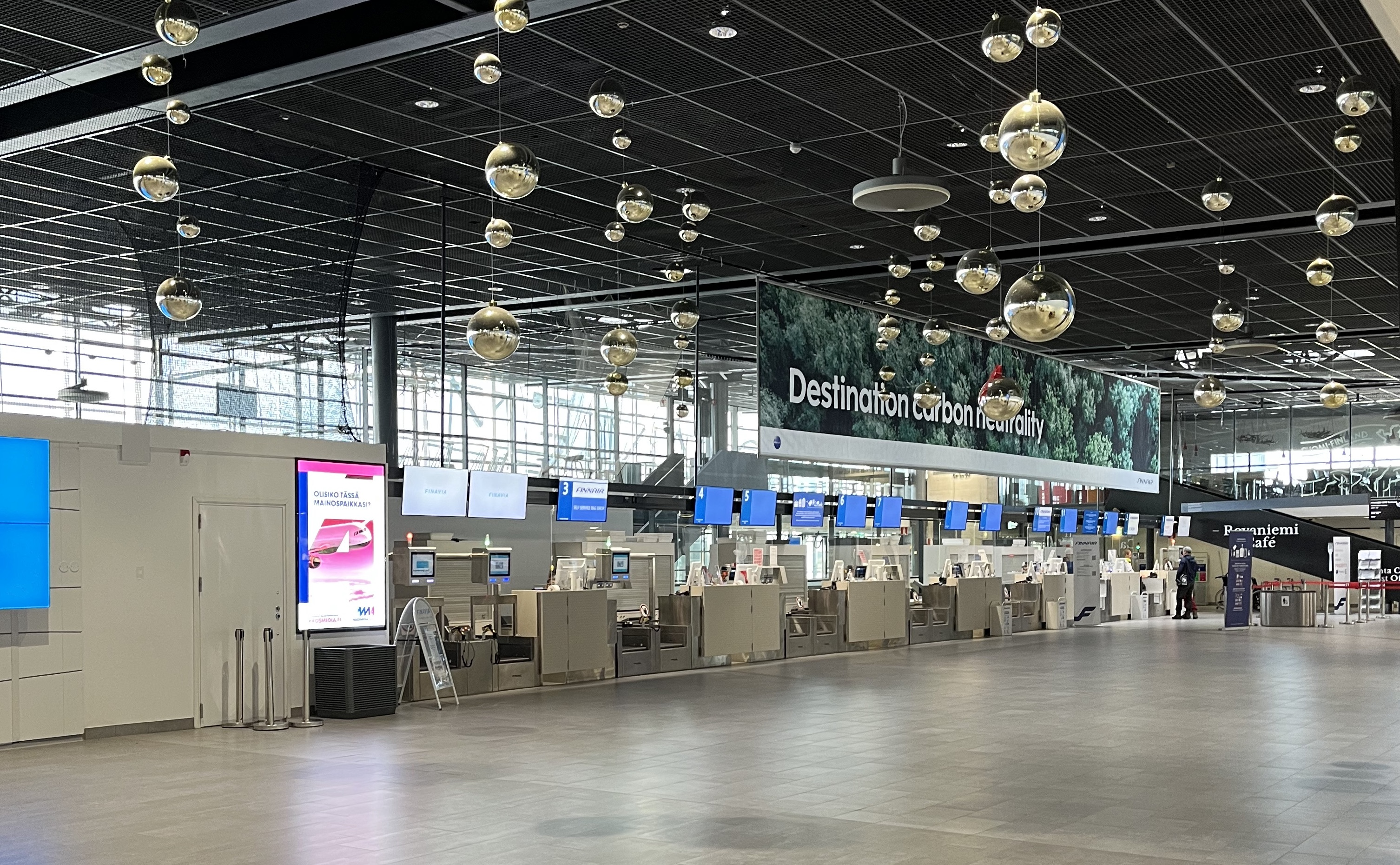
Rovaniemi Airport

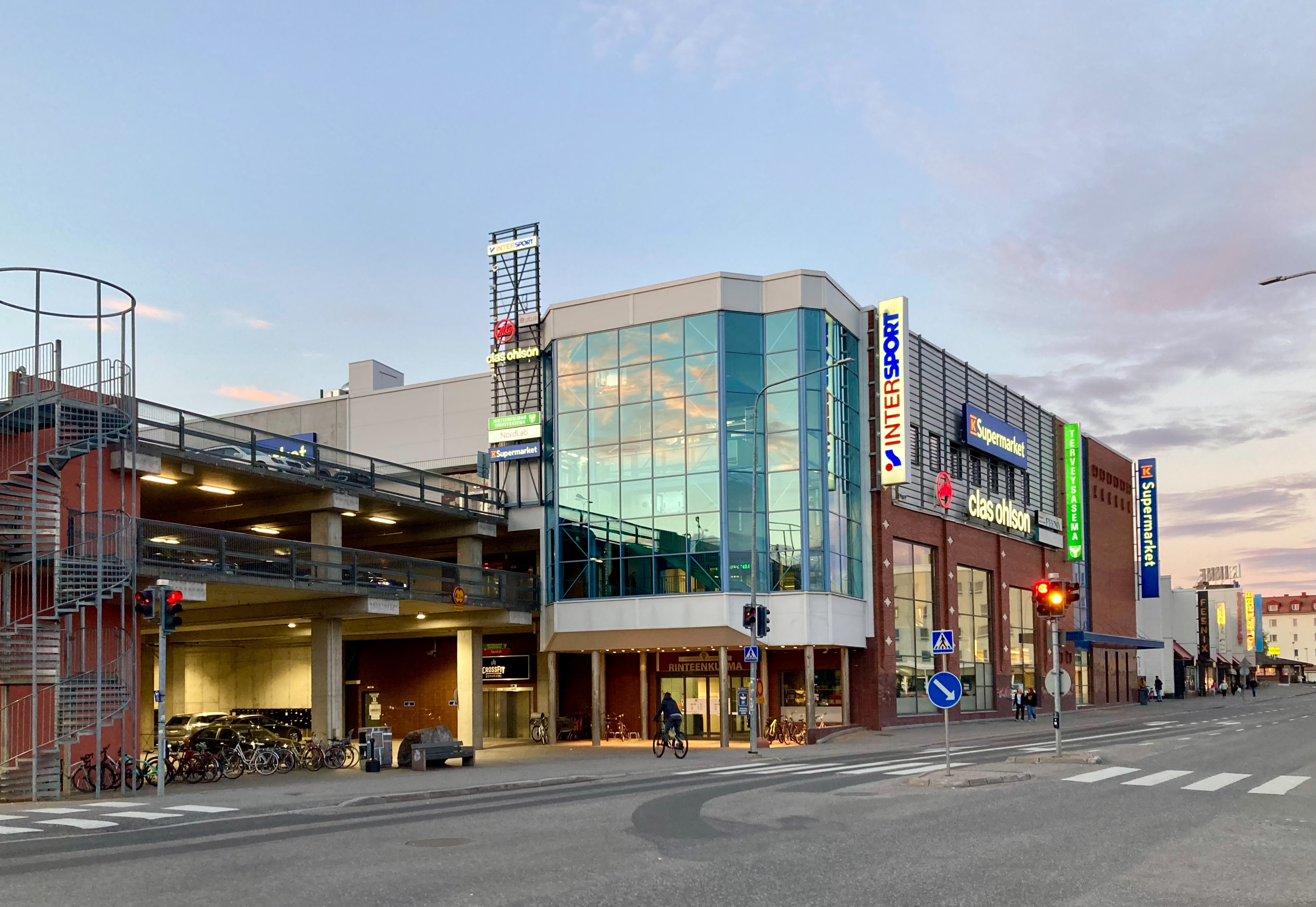
Shopping center Revontuli

VR Group, the Finnish state railway system, operates direct daytime and overnight passenger trains from Rovaniemi Station to Oulu, Tampere, Helsinki and Turku. Diesel-powered passenger trains operated northeast of Rovaniemi to Kemijärvi until March 2014, when electrification to that town was completed. Rovaniemi Airport is located about 10 kilometres (6 mi) north of the Rovaniemi city centre, and it is the second-busiest airport in Finland after Helsinki-Vantaa Airport; while at the beginning of the millennium, over 300 international flights landed in Rovaniemi annually, in the 2020s, the number is almost five times that. The busiest time for the airport is in the Christmas season, when many people go on Santa Flights.

== Notable inhabitants ==
- Snowboarder and 2005 Winter X Games gold medalist Antti Autti, Rovaniemi native, in April 2005 received his own piece of land in the city for being named to the 2006 Finnish Olympic team
- Antti Iivari (born 1992), ice hockey player
- writer Timo K. Mukka died in Rovaniemi in 1974
- Nätti-Jussi ("Pretty John"), legendary lumberjack and forester
- Harri Olli, ski jumper
- Tanja Poutiainen Alpine skier
- Tauno Luiro ski jumper, world record holder
- Tomi Putaansuu, better known as Mr. Lordi lead singer of the hard rock band and 2006 Eurovision Song Contest winner Lordi
- Jari Tervo, author
- Miia Tervo, film director
- Antti Tuisku, singer
- Progressive rock band Absoluuttinen Nollapiste
- The black metal band Beherit came from Rovaniemi

== Twin towns – sister cities ==
Rovaniemi is twinned with:

- Ajka, Hungary
- Alanya, Turkey
- Cadillac, United States
- Grindavík, Iceland
- Harbin, China
- Kassel, Germany
- Kiruna, Sweden
- Narvik, Norway
- Neustrelitz, Germany
- Olsztyn, Poland
- Sankt Johann in Tirol, Austria
- Veszprém, Hungary

In March 2022, Rovaniemi suspended the agreement with Murmansk, Russia due to the Russian invasion of Ukraine.

== In popular culture ==
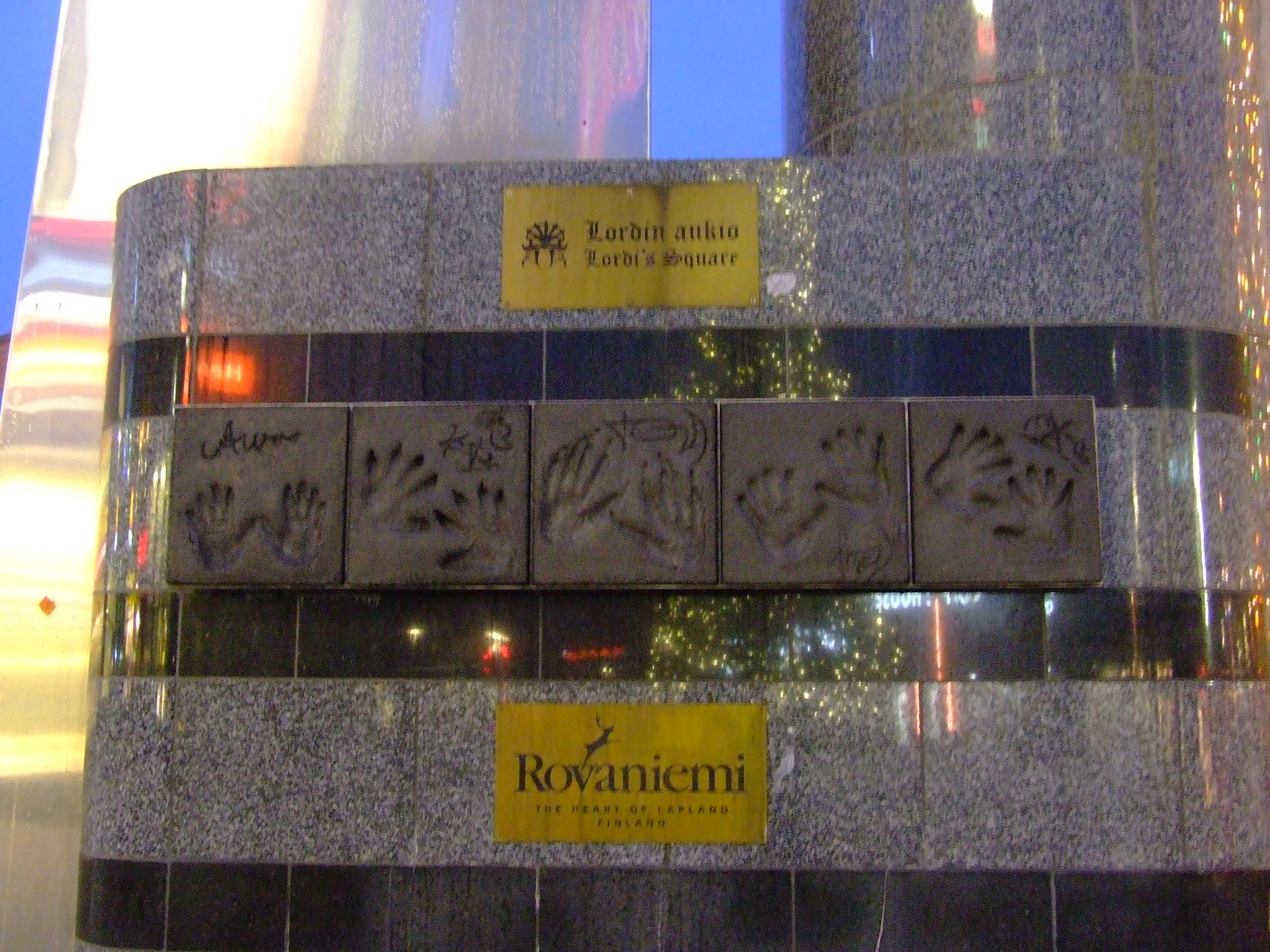
Hand prints and signatures of Lordi's line-up at the time can be seen at the Lordi's Square

The 1951 musical comedy film At the Rovaniemi Fair (Rovaniemen markkinoilla), which has been described as a reformer of Finnish film entertainment, is set in Rovaniemi, as its name suggests, in connection with the film's gold mining plot.

Rovaniemi appears as one location of Gavin Lyall's 1963 book The Most Dangerous Game, a spy-thriller set in Lapland and the northern USSR.

A 1996 Christmas episode of Tots TV called "Lapland Out" took place in Rovaniemi.

The 1998 Spanish romantic film Lovers of the Arctic Circle (Los amantes del Círculo Polar), by director Julio Medem, partly takes place in Rovaniemi.

Rovaniemi appears in the video game Tom Clancy's EndWar as a possible battlefield. In the game, Rovaniemi houses military facilities critical to a missile shield for a European Federation.

TV-Star Bam Margera and his friends travelled to Rovaniemi in their film Bam Margera Presents: Where the ♯$&% Is Santa? in order to find Santa Claus who is assumed to live in Rovaniemi.

A version of the music video for Lordi's song "Hard Rock Hallelujah" was filmed near Rovaniemi for the opening of the 2007 Eurovision Song Contest. After winning the contest, a square called the Lordi's Square (Lordin aukio) in the city center of Rovaniemi has been named after the band.

The video for the Nightwish single "The Islander" was filmed in Rovaniemi by Stobe Harju.

Rovaniemi is a central scene in the 2010 documentary film Reindeerspotting, as it deals with drug abusers in the city.

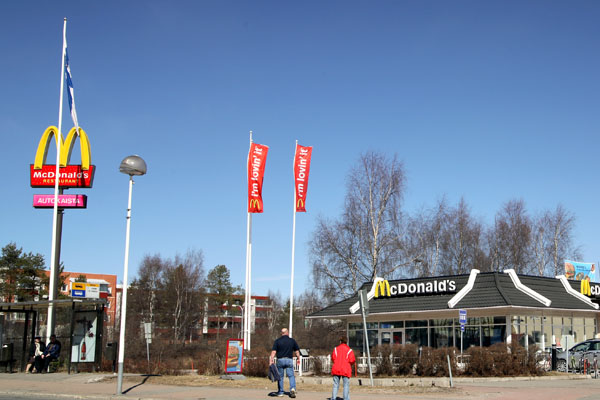
McDonald's location at Rovaniemi, formerly the northernmost McDonald's in the world from 1997 to 2013 and from 2022 to 2024.

Rovaniemi used to have the northernmost location of any McDonald's in the world from 1997 until the opening of a McDonald's in Murmansk in 2013, 23 years after it first opened in that country. However, the title of the northernmost in the world returned to Rovaniemi in 2022, when in response to Russia's invasion of Ukraine, all Russian McDonald's restaurants were closed, and rebranded to Vkusno i tochka. In January 2024, Rovaniemi once again lost the title of having the northernmost McDonald's in the world as a new restaurant opened in Tromsø, Norway.

Rovaniemi was featured in the first episode of The Reluctant Traveler.

Hallmark Media's 2024 television film The Finnish Line features scenes shot in Santa Claus Village.

== See also ==
- Misi, a village in Rovaniemi
- Pilke House
- University of the Arctic
