= Lappia Hall =

Theatre and congress centre in Rovaniemi, Finland

- Lappia-talo
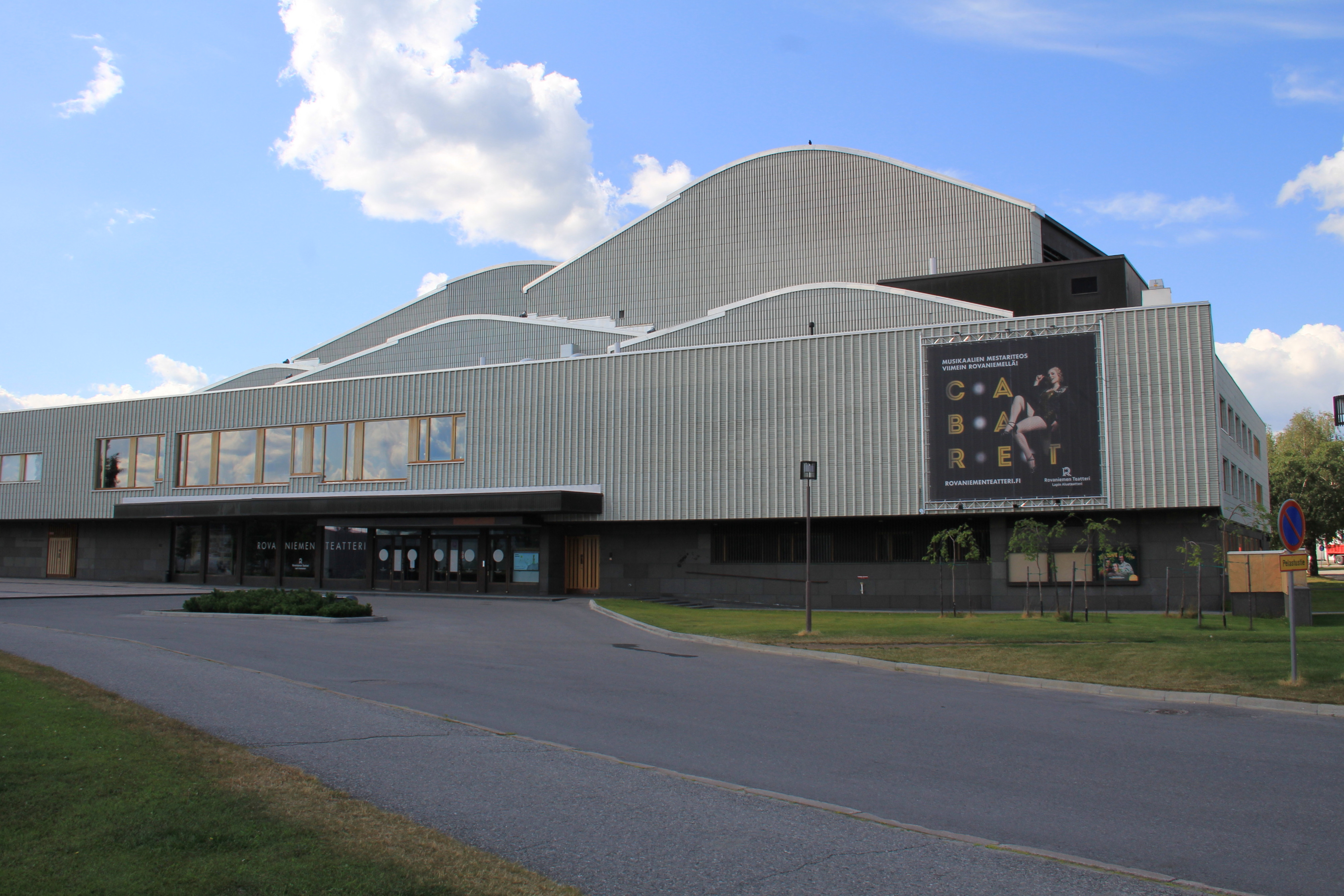

- Location within Finland

General information
- Type: Performing arts and conference venue
- Architectural style: Modernism
- Location: Rovaniemi, Finland
- Coordinates: 66.497100°N 25.720679°E
- Current tenants: Rovaniemi Theatre, and others
- Completed: 1961, 1971, 1975
- Owner: City of Rovaniemi

Design and construction
- Architect: Alvar Aalto

Lappia Hall (Finnish: Lappia-talo) is a performing arts venue and conference centre in Rovaniemi, the capital city of the Finnish Lapland region, situated close to the Arctic Circle. It is notable for having been designed by the renowned Finnish architect Alvar Aalto in the modernist style.

The wavy exterior roofline is reminiscent of the fells of Lapland. When lit at night, they also resemble the Northern Lights (see e.g. here).

The interior design makes extensive use of light wood and plain white surfaces with blue accents, typical of Aalto's later work. The public areas are largely furnished with light fixtures and furniture by Aalto's own furniture and interior design company, Artek.

The building was constructed in phases. The first phase was completed in 1961, and housed among other things the Finnish public broadcaster Yle's regional office, as well as the Lapland Music Institute (Lapin musiikkiopisto). The second phase, completed in 1971, is home to the municipal Rovaniemi Theatre, while the final phase, the conference centre, was finished in 1975. Lappia Hall was the last building Aalto saw finished, before his death in 1976.

In 2013–2015, the interior of the building was extensively renovated, as well as expanded to include underground performance venue and service areas. Today, the building comprises three auditoriums with a total seating capacity of c. 600, as well as two restaurants.

Lappia Hall forms part of a wider complex of public and administrative buildings designed by Aalto, known collectively as the 'Aalto Centre', along with the adjacent Rovaniemi library (completed in 1965) and Rovaniemi city hall (1988). The complex has been designated and protected by the Finnish Heritage Agency as a nationally important built cultural environment (Valtakunnallisesti merkittävä rakennettu kulttuuriympäristö).

== See also ==
- Aalto Centre
