= Rovaniemi city hall =

City hall in Finland

- Rovaniemen kaupungintalo
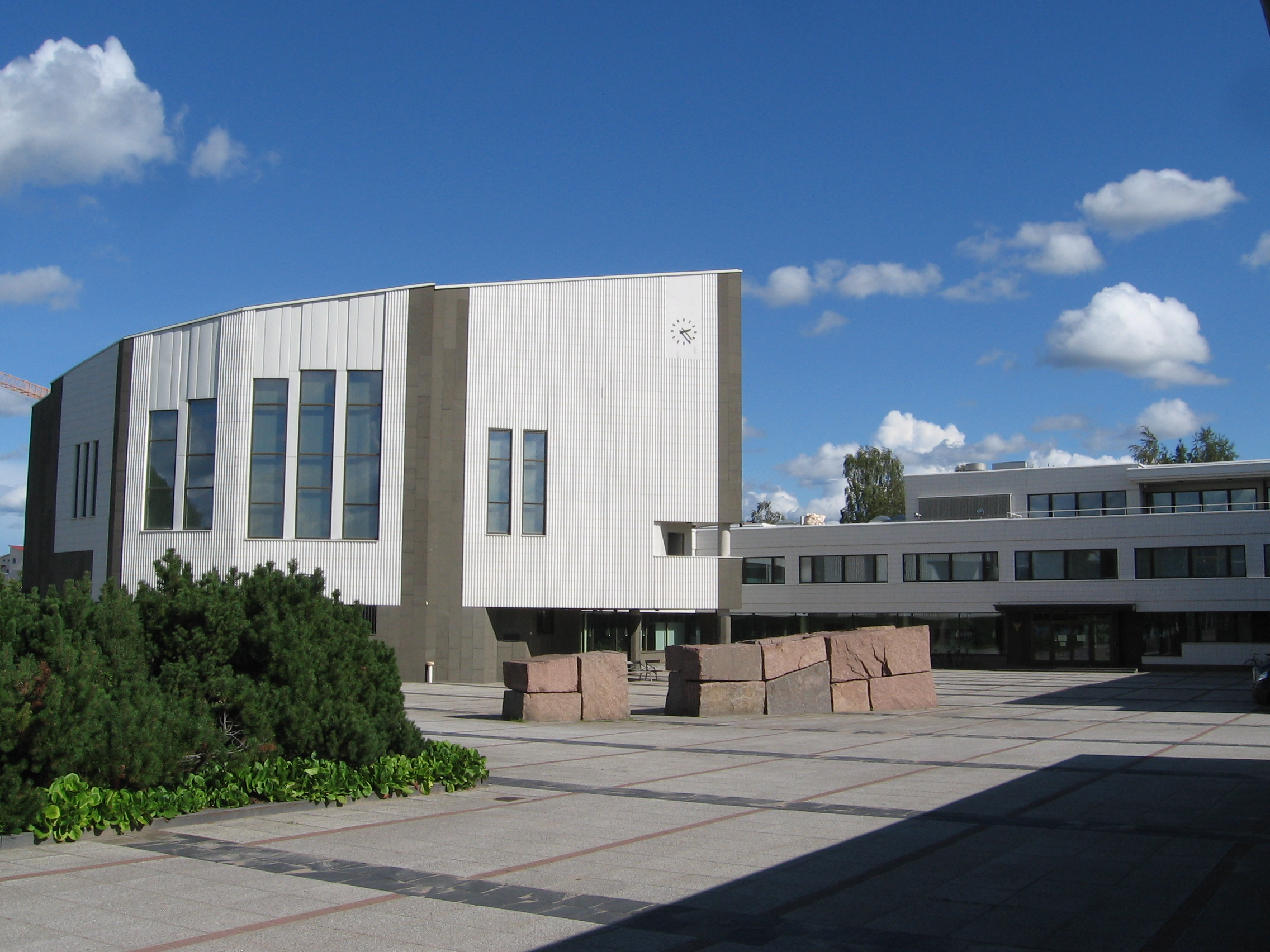
- Rovaniemi city hall, with Vuorten Synty sculpture in the foreground
- Interactive map of the Rovaniemi city hall area

General information
- Architectural style: Modernism
- Location: Rovaniemi, Finland
- Coordinates: 66.496502°N 25.725015°E

Design and construction
- Architect: Alvar Aalto

Rovaniemi city hall is the main municipal administrative building of the city of Rovaniemi, Finland.

The building was designed by the renowned Finnish architect Alvar Aalto, and although the design work started in the 1960s as part of the rebuilding of the Rovaniemi city centre, the city hall building was only completed in 1986 after Aalto's death.

The city hall is part of a complex of Aalto-designed public and administrative buildings, commonly referred to as 'Aalto Centre', together with the Lappia Hall arts and conference venue and the Rovaniemi library. The complex has been designated and protected by the Finnish Heritage Agency as a nationally important built cultural environment (Valtakunnallisesti merkittävä rakennettu kulttuuriympäristö).

The building consists of a central block with several connected wings. The key rooms such as the Mayor's office, the City Council assembly hall and committee meeting rooms are positioned centrally by the main entrance. The exterior materials are similar to those on the other Aalto Centre buildings, creating a coherent and unified cluster.

Outside the main entrance to the building is a massive stone sculpture Vuorten Synty ('The Birth of Mountains') by the Finnish sculptor Kain Tapper, completed in 1988. The sculpture is 120 metres (390 ft) long, and has a maximum height of 2.3 metres (7 ft 7 in). It symbolises the rebirth of Rovaniemi following the Lapland War.

== See also ==
- Aalto Centre
