= Lordi's Square =

Square in Rovaniemi, Finland

Coordinates: 66°30′09″N 025°43′48″E

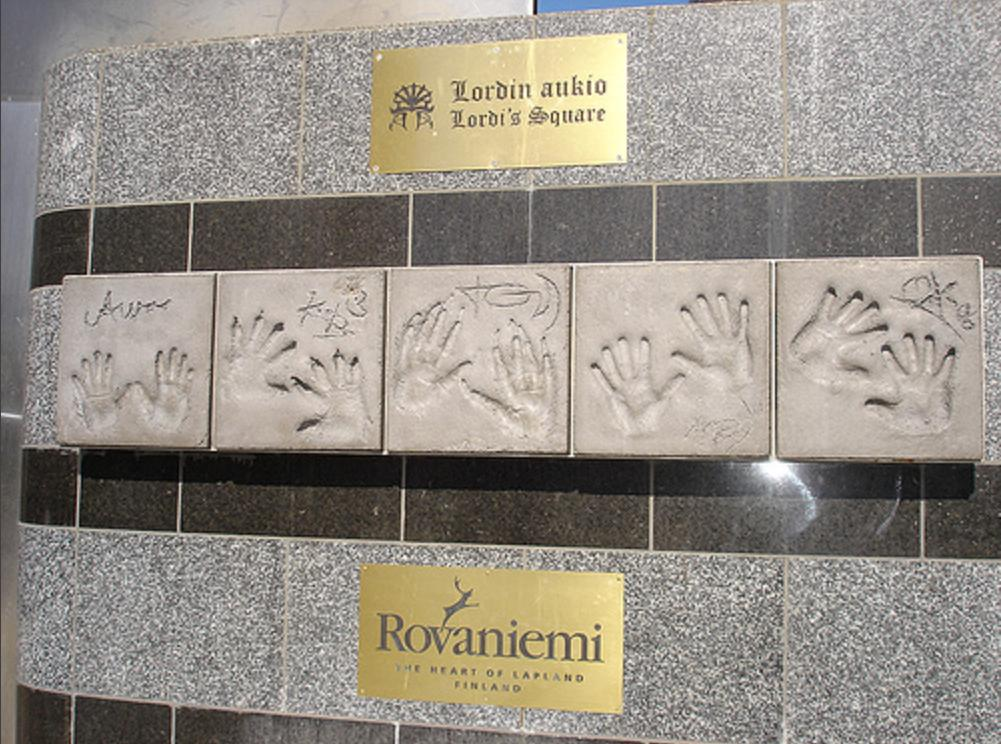
Hand prints and signatures of Lordi's line-up at the time can be seen at the Lordi's Square

Lordi's Square (Finnish: Lordin aukio, known as the Sampo Square until 2006) is a square in central Rovaniemi, Finland. Next to the square are located a shopping centre called Sampokeskus and a small boulevard. The square is especially popular in summer as a venue for various events.

Formerly known as the Sampo Square, the square was renamed the Lordi's Square in June 2006 in honour of Lordi's victory in the 2006 Eurovision Song Contest. On 9 June 2006, the square held a folk party, where Lordi also appeared. All members of Lordi have been appointed honorary citizens of Rovaniemi.
