= Nivankylä =

Village in Rovaniemi, Finland

Coordinates: 66.58756°N 25.61639°E

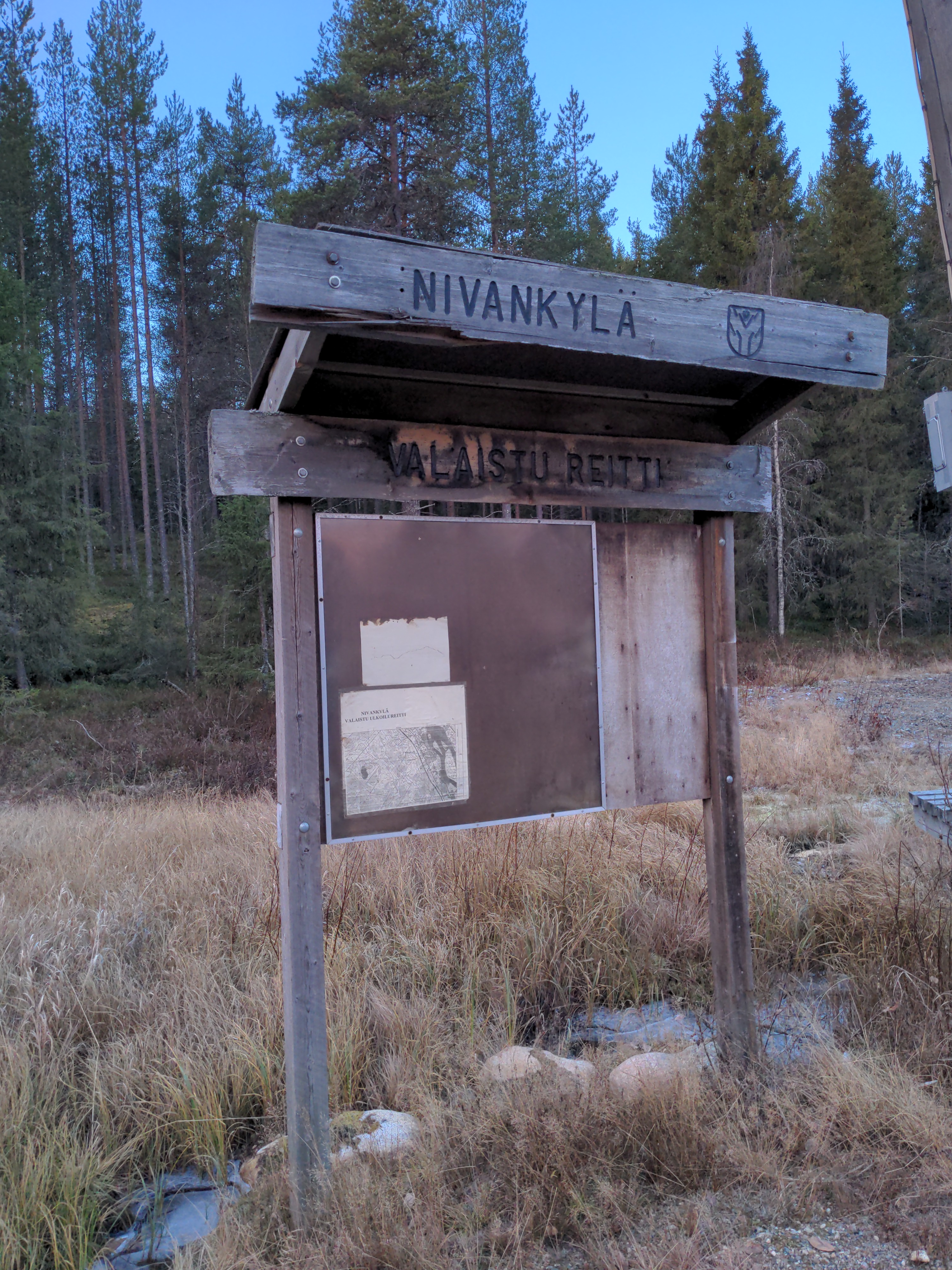
A bus stop at Nivankylä

Nivankylä is a village in Rovaniemi, Finland along the Ounasjoki river. The village has more than 600 inhabitants and includes a primary school. It is located just north of the Arctic Circle.
