= SAFA (architecture) =

- Finnish Association of Architects
- Suomen arkkitehtiliitto/Finlands arkitektförbund
- Founded: 1892
- Headquarters: Helsinki, Finland
- Location: Finland
- Members: 2,950 full members, 735 student members
- Key people: Asko Takala, president
- Affiliations: AKAVA

SAFA (Finnish: Suomen Arkkitehtiliitto, Swedish: Finlands Arkitektförbund, English: Finnish Association of Architects) is the professional body representing architects in Finland.

== Overview ==
=== The Association ===
SAFA is a non-profit, professional organization open to all architects with a university degree from a Finnish university or equivalent qualification from another country. SAFA has 2906 members (61% male and 39% female). This accounts for approx 80% of all Finnish architects with a university degree. Membership is voluntary, and is not a condition for practising in the profession. In Finland no registration is required. SAFA has also 743 student members.

=== SAFA Activities ===
The primary aim of all SAFA activities is to promote the quality of the built environment. At the national level, SAFA endeavours to influence legislation by presenting SAFA opinion in the form of statements and conducting discussions with politicians and various public authorities. Together with other organizations in the building sector, SAFA has defined the scope of work for architectural design. To ensure the interests of both clients and architects, SAFA monitors and provides information about architectural fees. It also supervises professional standards and ethics among its members.

=== Executive Board ===
At its annual autumn meeting, the Delegates Council appoints the SAFA Executive Board, which consists of 10 members. The Chairman of the Executive Board is called the Chairman of the Association and the Board’s 2 vice-chairmen are both called Vice-Chairman of the Association. The Board has created committees and workgroups to aid in its tasks.

=== Membership ===
Finnish citizens who have a degree in architecture from a Finnish university or an equivalent professional qualification are eligible for SAFA membership. Citizens of other Nordic countries are further required to be permanent residents in Finland and working in the field of architecture. Architects from elsewhere outside the Nordic countries must furthermore have lived in Finland for at least 2 years and know sufficient Finnish or Swedish in order to be able to adhere to the SAFA rules and the guidelines issued to members.

People with a degree in architecture from elsewhere than Finland must include a report on their studies when applying for SAFA membership. Usually a printout of the contents of the person’s studies or similar is acceptable.

=== Benefits of Membership ===
SAFA deals with questions related to benefits in the job market via AKAVA (A confederation of trade unions for academic professionals). The SAFA Permanent Committee for Employment Issues is responsible for practical labour-market issues concerning both those working in architects’ offices as well as those in the public sector. The Employment Issues' Committee also keeps contacts with the Finnish Association of Graduate Engineers TEK, with which it has a cooperation agreement.

For questions regarding agreements and the setting of fees within the private sector, SAFA has a Board Committee for Professional Practice, which on behalf of clients or SAFA members issues expert statements regarding the content of assignment agreements, and the validity of the architect’s fees.

The Board Committee for Education and Research monitors social and other professionally related changes influencing the architect’s basic, post-graduate and continuing education. This committee also prepares proposals, initiatives and statements.

With its long traditions, the Permanent Committee for Collegial Issues, appointed by the Association Council, deals with issues of collegiality between members and norms concerning the architects’ ethics.
