= List of companies of Finland =

Location of Finland

Finland is a sovereign state in Northern Europe. It was a relative latecomer to industrialization, remaining a largely agrarian country until the 1950s. It rapidly developed an advanced economy while building an extensive Nordic-style welfare state, resulting in widespread prosperity and one of the highest per capita incomes in the world. However, Finnish GDP growth was negative in 2012–2014 (−0.698% to −1.426%), after a previous nadir of −8% in 2009. Finland is a top performer in numerous metrics of national performance, including education, economic competitiveness, civil liberties, quality of life, and human development.

For further information on the types of business entities in this country and their abbreviations, see "Business entities in Finland".

== Notable firms ==
This list includes notable companies with primary headquarters located in the country. The industry and sector follow the Industry Classification Benchmark taxonomy. Organizations which have ceased operations are included and noted as defunct.

Notable companies Status: P=Private, S=State; A=Active, D=Defunct
Name	Industry	Sector	Headquarters	Founded	Notes	Status	
Ahlstrom	Basic materials	Basic resources	Helsinki	1851	Fiber materials	P	A
Aktia Bank	Financials	Banks	Helsinki	1991	Finance	P	A
Alma Media	Consumer services	Publishing	Helsinki	1849	Digital media	P	A
Amer Sports	Consumer goods	Recreational products	Helsinki	1950	Sporting equipment	P	A
Bank of Åland	Financials	Banks	Mariehamn	1919	Finance	P	A
Bittium	Consumer goods	Consumer electronics	Oulu	1985	Electronics	P	A
Codenomicon	Technology	Software	Oulu	2001	Computer security testing	P	A
DNA Oyj	Telecommunications	Mobile telecommunications	Helsinki	2000	Telecommunications services	P	A
Eckerö Line	Industrials	Marine transportation	Helsinki	1995	Shipping	P	A
Elisa	Telecommunications	Fixed line telecommunications	Helsinki	1882	Telecommunications services	P	A
Fazer	Consumer services	Restaurants & bars	Helsinki	1891	Food and restaurants	P	A
Fingrid	Utilities	Conventional electricity	Helsinki	1996	Electricity transmission	S	A
Finlayson	Consumer goods	Textiles manufacturing	Helsinki	1820	Textiles	P	A
Finnair	Consumer services	Airlines	Vantaa	1923	Airline	P	A
Finnlines	Industrials	Marine transportation	Helsinki	1947	Shipping	P	A
Fiskars	Consumer goods	Durable household products	Helsinki	1649	Kitchen, garden, and outdoors equipment	P	A
Fortum	Utilities	Alternative electricity	Espoo	1998	Energy	P	A
F-Secure	Technology	Software	Helsinki	1988	Computer software	P	A
Hiab	Industrials	Industrial machinery	Helsinki	2005	Cargo-handling machinery	P	A
HKScan	Consumer goods	Restaurants & bars	Turku	1913	Food	P	A
HMD	Consumer goods	Consumer electronics	Espoo	2016	Mobile phones	P	A
Holvi	Financials	Banking	Helsinki	2011	Online business banking	P	A
Huhtamäki	Industrials	Containers & packaging	Espoo	1920	Food packaging	P	A
Kemira	Basic materials	Specialty chemicals	Helsinki	1920	Chemicals	P	A
Kemppi	Industrials	Industrial machinery	Lahti	1949	Welding equipment	P	A
Kesko	Consumer services	Broadline retailers	Helsinki	1940	Retailing	P	A
Kone	Industrials	Industrial machinery	Helsinki	1910	Elevators and escalators	P	A
Konecranes	Industrials	Industrial machinery	Hyvinkää	1994	Lifting equipment	P	A
LähiTapiola	Financials	Full line insurance	Espoo	2013	Insurance	P	A
Lemminkäinen Group	Industrials	Heavy construction	Helsinki	1910	Construction	P	D
Marimekko	Consumer goods	Clothing & accessories	Helsinki	1951	Fashion design	P	A
Metsä Group	Basic materials	Paper	Helsinki	1947	Paper, pulp, timber	P	A
Metso	Industrials	Business support services	Helsinki	1999	Equipment and services for process industries	P	A
Navielektro	Industrials	Defense	Kaarina	1987	Radar, communications equipment	P	A
Neste	Oil & gas	Exploration & production	Espoo	1948	Petroleum, biofuels	P	A
Nokia	Industrials	Telecommunications equipment	Espoo	1865	Telecommunications infrastructure and equipment	P	A
Nokia Networks	Technology	Telecommunications equipment	Espoo	2007	Part of Nokia	P	A
Nokian Jalkineet	Consumer goods	Footwear	Helsinki	1898	Boots	P	A
Nokian Tyres	Consumer goods	Tires	Nokia	1932	Tyres	P	A
Nordea	Financials	Financial services	Helsinki	2001	Financial services	P	A
OP Financial Group	Financials	Financial services	Helsinki	1891	Finance and insurance	P	A
Orion Corporation	Health care	Pharmaceuticals	Espoo	1917	Pharmaceuticals	P	A
Oura Health	Health care	Consumer electronics	Oulu	2013	Health technology	P	A
Outokumpu	Basic materials	Iron & steel	Helsinki	1932	Steel	P	A
Outotec	Industrials	Business support services	Espoo	2006	Mineral and metals processing technology	P	A
Patria	Industrials	Defense	Helsinki	1997	Military technology	S	A
Planmeca	Health care	Medical equipment	Helsinki	1971	Dental and medical technology	P	A
Pohjolan Voima	Utilities	Alternative electricity	Helsinki	1943	Energy	P	A
Polar Electro	Consumer goods	Recreational products	Kempele	1977	Fitness equipment	P	A
Ponsse Corporation	Industrials	Commercial vehicles & trucks	Vieremä	1970	Forestry vehicles	P	A
Posiva	Industrials	Waste & disposal services	Eurajoki	1995	Nuclear waste management	P	A
Posti Group	Logistics	Delivery services	Helsinki	1638	Postal service	S	A
Pöyry	Industrials	Business support services	Vantaa	1958	Consulting and engineering	P	A
Process Vision	Technology	Software	Helsinki	1993	IT for energy companies	P	A
Raisio Group	Consumer goods	Food products	Raisio	1939	Food	P	A
Rauma Marine Constructions	Industrials	Defense	Rauma	2014	Shipbuilding	P	A
Rautaruukki	Industrials	Building materials & fixtures	Helsinki	1960	Steel products	P	A
S Group	Consumer services	Hotels	Helsinki	1904	Retailing, hotels	P	A
Saarioinen	Consumer goods	Food products	Tampere	1955	Food	P	A
SAKO	Industrials	Defense	Riihimäki	1921	Firearms	P	A
Sampo Group	Financials	Full line insurance	Helsinki	1909	Insurance	P	A
Sanoma	Consumer services	Publishing	Helsinki	1999	Books and magazines	P	A
Silja Line	Industrials	Marine transportation	Helsinki	1957	Shipping, part of Tallink (Estonia)	P	A
Sisu Auto	Industrials	Commercial vehicles & trucks	Helsinki	1931	Heavy Duty Trucks & Military Vehicles	P	A
Solidium	Financials	Investment services	Helsinki	2008	Investments	S	A
SSH Communications Security	Technology	Software	Helsinki	1995	Computer software	P	A
St1	Oil & gas	Exploration & production	Helsinki	1995	Petroleum	P	A
Stockmann	Consumer services	Broadline retailers	Helsinki	1862	Retailing	P	A
Stonesoft Corporation	Technology	Software	Helsinki	1990	Network security, defunct, now part of Forcepoint (USA)	P	D
Stora Enso	Basic materials	Paper	Helsinki	1998	Paper, pulp, timber	P	A
Suominen Corporation	Consumer goods	Clothing & accessories	Helsinki	1898	Convenience and care nonwovens	P	A
Suunto	Consumer goods	Recreational services	Vantaa	1936	Technical sports equipment, part of Amer Sports	P	A
Talvivaara Mining Company	Basic materials	Nonferrous metals	Espoo	2004	Nickel mining	P	A
Tieto	Technology	Software	Helsinki	1968	Information technology	P	A
Tikkurila	Basic materials	Commodity chemicals	Vantaa	1862	Paints	P	A
UPM-Kymmene	Basic materials	Paper	Helsinki	1996	Paper, pulp, timber, biofuels	P	A
Vacon	Industrials	Electrical components & equipment	Vaasa	1993	Variable-speed AC drives	P	A
Vaisala	Technology	Software	Vantaa	1936	Environmental measuring technology	P	A
Valio	Consumer goods	Food products	Helsinki	1905	Food	P	A
Valmet Automotive	Consumer goods	Automobiles	Uusikaupunki	1968	Car assembly	P	A
Valmet	Industrials	Industrial machinery	Espoo	2013	Industrial equipment	P	A
Valtra	Industrials	Commercial vehicles & trucks	Äänekoski	1951	Tractors	P	A
Verkkokauppa.com	Consumer services	Broadline retailers	Helsinki	1992	Storefront and online retail	P	A
VR	Industrials	Railroads	Helsinki	1862	Rail transport	S	A
Wärtsilä	Industrials	Electronic equipment	Vaasa	1834	Power plants and marine propulsion systems	P	A
Woikoski	Basic materials	Basic resources	Voikoski	1882	Helium	P	A
YIT	Industrials	Heavy construction	Helsinki	1912	Construction	P	A
Youpret	Consumer services	Translation services	Joensuu	2016	Translation services	P	A

== See also ==
- List of largest companies in Finland
- List of banks in Finland
