= J. W. Suominen =

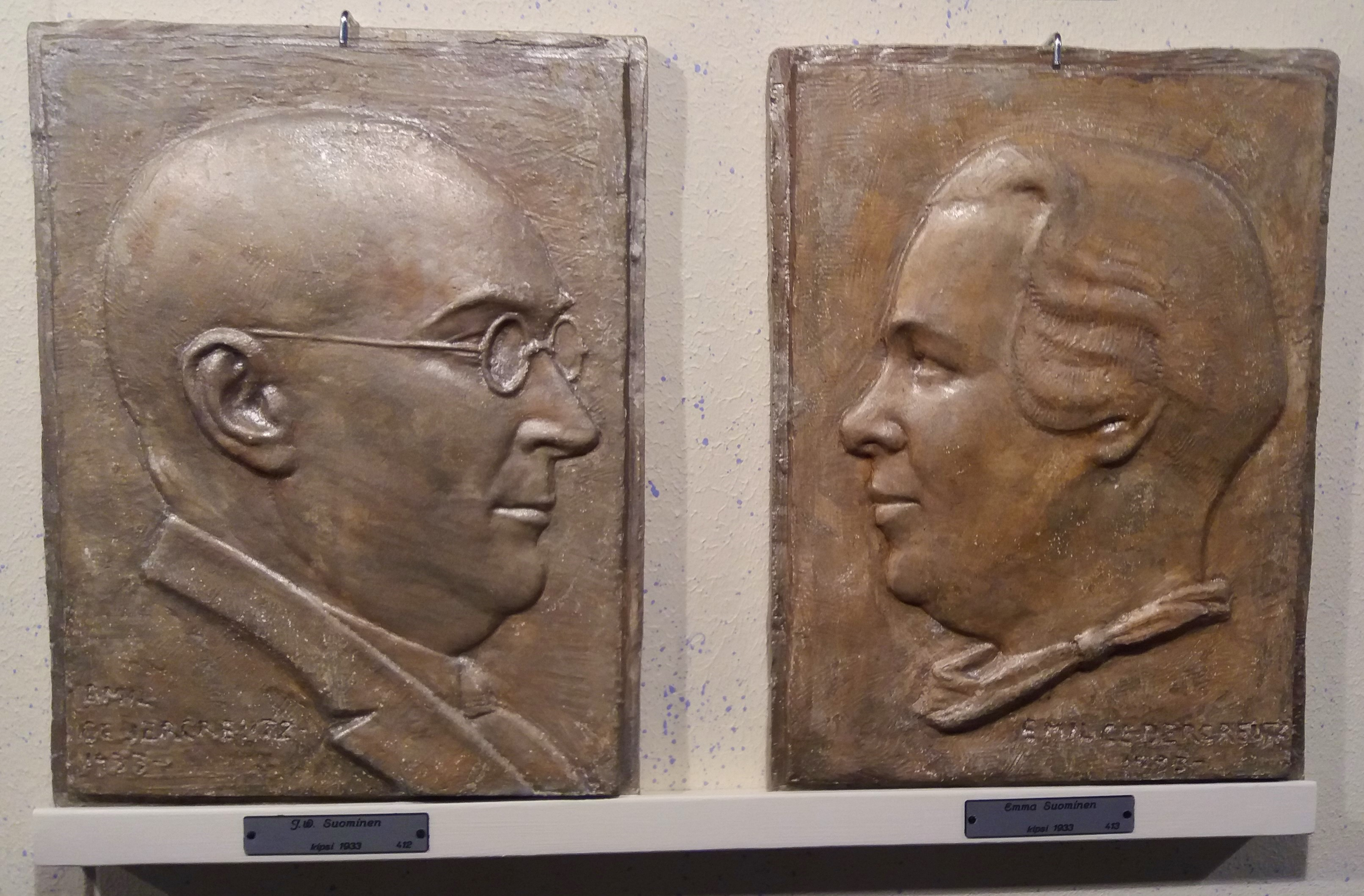
Relief sculptures of J. W. Suominen and Emma Suominen, 1933

Juho Wiktor Suominen (June 26, 1877 Lappi (Rauma)- August 27, 1935 Pori) was a Finnish manufacturer. In 1898, he founded a tannery in Nakkila along the Tattaranjoki River, which in 1908 became J. W. Suominen Oy. The internationalized company is now known as Suominen Corporation. Koskilinna, built by Suominen as a private home and designed by architect Väinö Vähäkallio, was completed in Nakkila in 1928.

Suominen died of a misfired bullet during a walk in 1935, he died in the Porin kaupunginsairaala. The bullet was fired from an unknown rifle, the bullet hit Suominen on a road nearby the Villilä manor. It was successfully removed during surgery, but Suominen, who suffered from heart problems, died a few days later. In a will he drafted on his deathbed, he donated funds to build a new church in Nakkila. Suominen is buried in the crypt under the church together with his wife Emma Koskinen (1878–1953).

J. W. Suominen's son, Leo Suominen was a kauppaneuvos, whose son is a politician and former Minister Ilkka Suominen.
