= Töysä =

- Former municipality
- Töysän kunta Töysä kommun
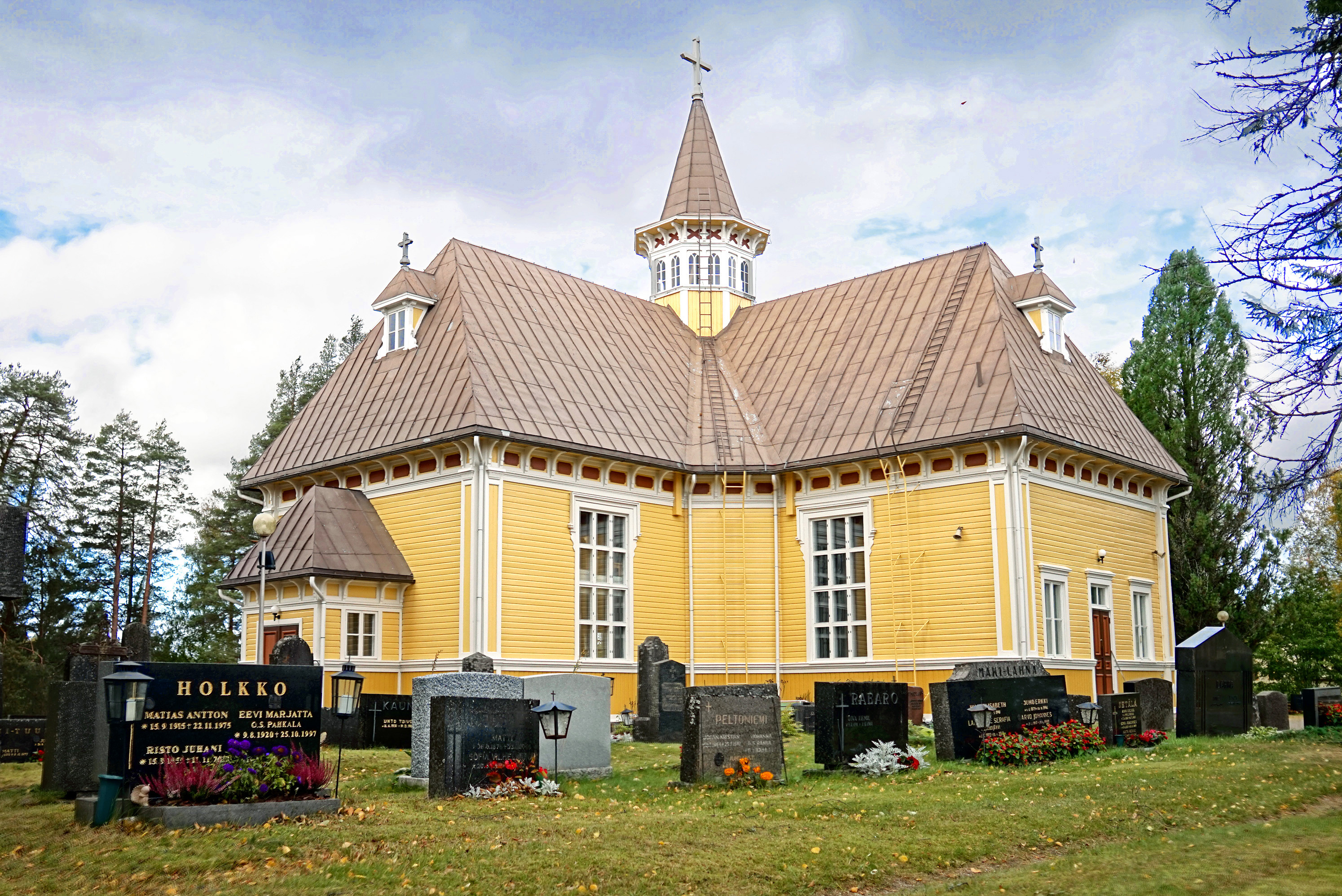
- Töysä Church

- Coat of arms

- Location of Töysä in Finland
- Coordinates: 62°38′N 023°49′E
- Country: Finland
- Region: South Ostrobothnia
- Sub-region: Kuusiokunnat sub-region
- Charter: 1865
- Consolidated: 2013

Area
  - Total: 309.66 km^{2} (119.56 sq mi)
  - Land: 297.75 km^{2} (114.96 sq mi)
  - Water: 11.91 km^{2} (4.60 sq mi)

Population (31 December 2012)
  - Total: 3,122
  - Density: 10.49/km^{2} (27.16/sq mi)
- Time zone: UTC+2 (EET)
  - Summer (DST): UTC+3 (EEST)

Töysä is a former municipality in Western Finland. It was consolidated to Alavus on 1 January 2013. It is part of the South Ostrobothnia region. The municipality had a population of 3,122 (31 December 2012) and covered an area of 309.66 square kilometres (119.56 sq mi) of which 11.91 km^{2} (4.60 sq mi) was water. The population density is 10.4853/km^{2} (27.157/sq mi). Most inhabitants speak Finnish, with hardly any other languages being spoken.

Töysä is known for its shopping village Tuuri and the Veljekset Keskinen department store.

== History ==
The village of Töysäjärvi was established sometime before 1568. It was larger than the modern Töysä and a part of the Lapua parish. When the Kuortane chapel community was formed in 1645, Töysäjärvi was one of its villages. By the 17th century, the village's name had been shortened to Töysä. Its western part was called Ala-Töysä while the eastern part was called Yli-Töysä. In 1798, Kuortane became a parish while Yli-Töysä became a chapel community within Kuortane named Töysä. At the same time, Ala-Töysä was moved to the Alavus chapel community. The name Ala-Töysä was later supplanted by Ranta-Töysä.

Töysä became a municipality in 1865 and got a parish in 1926. Töysä was consolidated with Alavus in 2013.

== Notable people ==
- Jari-Matti Latvala, rally driver
- Olli-Pekka Karjalainen, former hammer thrower
- Jani Wickholm, pop singer
