= Laaksonen =

Laaksonen is a Finnish surname. Notable people with the surname include:

- Verner Laaksonen (1895–1985), Finnish long-distance runner
- Tom of Finland (Touko Laaksonen; 1920–1991), Finnish artist
- Olavi Laaksonen (1921–2004), Finnish footballer
- Jukka Laaksonen (born 1958), Finnish comedian
- Heli Laaksonen (born 1972), Finnish poet
- Antti Laaksonen (born 1973), Finnish ice hockey player
- Emma Terho (née Laaksonen, born 1981), Finnish ice hockey player
- Valtter Laaksonen (born 1984), Finnish footballer
- Ninni Laaksonen (born 1986), Miss Finland 2006
- Jesse Laaksonen (born 1989), Finnish ice hockey player
- Johannes Laaksonen (born 1990), Finnish footballer
- Jere Laaksonen (born 1991), Finnish ice hockey player
- Henri Laaksonen (born 1992), Swiss-Finnish tennis player
