= High Power User Equipment =

Special class of user equipment for the LTE cellular network

High Power User Equipment (HPUE) is a special class of user equipment for the LTE cellular network.

In Release 11 of the LTE standard, 3GPP proposed so called High Power User Equipment (HPUE) for band 14 (700 MHz).

UE's outside of band 14 or 41 UE are only allowed to transmit at a maximum output power of 23 dBm, while on HPUE bands, they are allowed to transmit with an output power of up to 31 dBm. Since the transmission range depends on the transmit power, the cell range can be increased by nearly 80% and user devices can operate better in challenging RF environments, such as inside large concrete buildings.

The first HPUE was presented by the Finnish company Bittium Oyj formerly known as Elektrobit, together with Rohde & Schwarz at Mobile World Congress 2014. They implemented the test cases of 3GPP, to show that the use of HPUE does indeed not interfere with adjacent commercial LTE networks. Since then, HPUE has become much more commonplace and is available on a multitude of devices.

The first portable, battery-operated device to operate with HPUE capabilities in actual field operation is the HPUE Band 14 Personal Gateway device by Assured Wireless Corporation in early 2017, Assured Wireless was Acquired by Nextivity Inc. in 2023. This device is fully compliant with 3GPP specifications for HPUE and operates at the full 31dBm maximum transmit power levels. Tests on networks around the U.S. and, specifically, actual public safety user experience at the 2017 Houston Livestock Show and Rodeo showed the ability of this HPUE equipment to operate with any LTE Band 14 network with reliable performance that stays connected in areas where all existing standard-power LTE devices fail to connect, while also improving user data rates even in areas of good coverage and increasing overall cell capacity.
