= Eemeli Reponen =

Finnish footballer (born 1990)

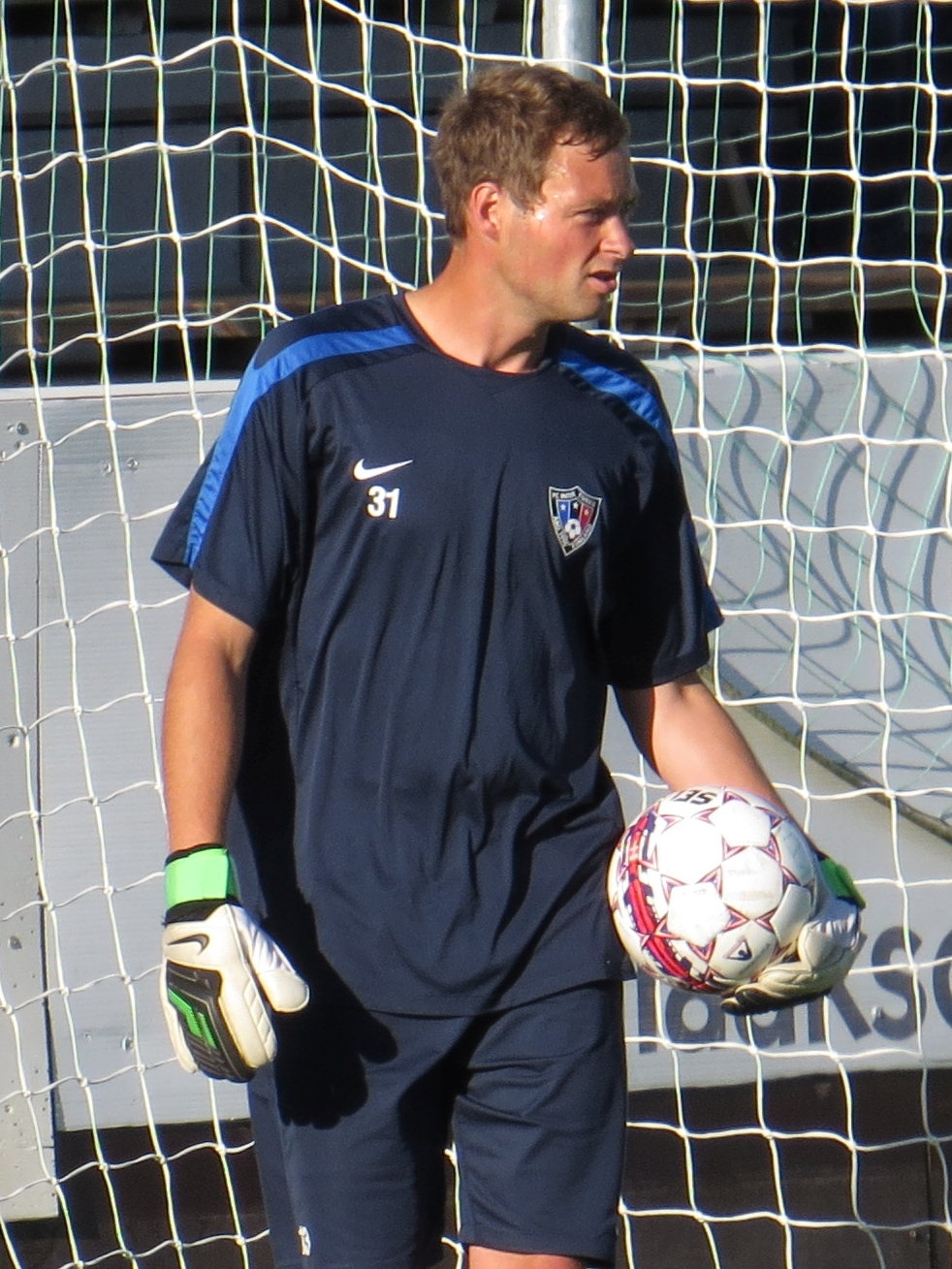
- Eemeli Reponen in 2015

Personal information
- Date of birth: 6 June 1990 (age 36)
- Place of birth: Nakkila, Finland
- Height: 1.89 m (6 ft 2 in)
- Position: Goalkeeper

Team information
- Current team: Finland U21 (goalkeeping coach)

Senior career*
Years	Team	Apps	(Gls)
2009–2021	Inter Turku	24	(0)
2011	→ LoPa (loan)	11	(0)
2013	KTP	12	(0)
2015	Inter Turku	3	(0)
2015	ÅIFK	2	(0)
2017	TPS	0	(0)

International career
2010	Finland U21	4	(0)

Managerial career
- 2017–2018: TPS (gk coach)
- 2021–2022: Honka (gk coach)
- 2023–: Finland U21 (gk coach)
- * Club domestic league appearances and goals

Eemeli Reponen (born 6 June 1990) is a Finnish professional football coach and a former player. He works as a goalkeepers coach with Honka. Reponen started his junior career in FC Jazz and has also played for the junior squad of TPS. He is currently the goalkeeping coach of Finland U21 national team.
