= Mimmi Bähr =

Finnish inventor (1844-1923

- Born: Henrika Wilhelmina Westerstrand; 15 October 1844; Alavus (now Finland)
- Died: 2 May 1923 (aged 78)
- Occupation: Inventor of calligraphy

Henrika Wilhelmina (Mimmi) Bähr (nee Westerstrand) (October 15, 1844 – May 2, 1923) was a Finnish inventor and developer of calligraphy.

== Life and work ==
Bähr was born in Alavus (which was then part of Russia, now Finland) to Gustaf Erik Westerstrand and Anna Henrika Åberg.

She worked as a scribe of the Senate of Finland and archivist of the Finance Commission 1868–1904, as a scribe of the Finnish parliament and also the Diet, 1878–1906. From 1877 to 1923, she organized teaching courses in calligraphy and in 1885, she published calligraphy systems for schools.

Bähr is recognized as one of Finland's significant inventors.

Bähr was the best prose calligrapher of her time and a developer of the art of cursive writing. She was entrusted with the most important Finnish documents which had to be written cleanly and clearly. She was also tasked with a wide range of private addresses and writings, where the aim was to make the style as refined as possible.

Beginning in 1877, she gave courses in calligraphy and in 1885 she started publishing calligraphy systems for public and grammar schools. They were widely used in classrooms and for her work she received prizes. She also produced a wide range of supplementary writing aids that were necessary at the time, such as rulers, pencil erasers, letter and stamp moisteners, regular pencils and potting papers, which became popular.

Until 2015, the teaching of cursive writing was a requirement in Finnish schools.

She married the merchant Nikolai Edward Bähr (d. 1868) in 1864.
