= Alavus Church =

Church in Alavus, Finland

Coordinates: 62.5886°N 23.6206°E

The Alavus Church (Finnish:Alavuden kirkko) in Alavus, Finland, is the fourth church in the community and was completed in 1914. The stuccoed brick church was designed by Kauno S. Kallio.

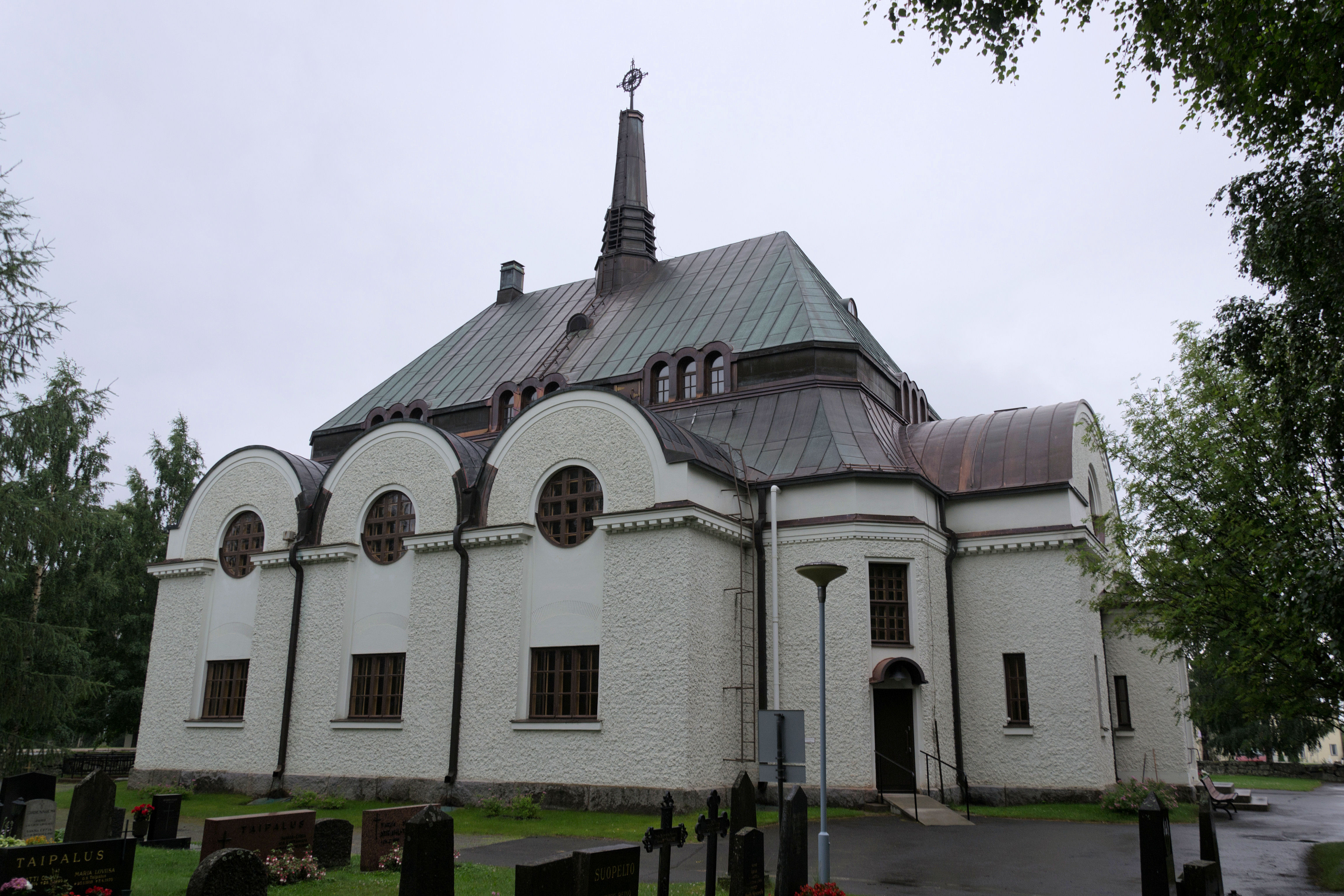
Church in Alavus, Finland

The shape of the Alavus church is a long church covered by a high aum roof. The altarpiece painted by Oskari Paatela shows the taking of Jesus from the cross. The church's current organ was acquired in 1970 and renovated in 2006–2007.

The most significant renovation to the church was made in 1992, when the back part of the church was converted into a vestibule. At the same time, a nursery room, a bridal couple's room, and a separate space for sound reproduction and television broadcasts were built.

The church also functions as a road church in the summer.

Alavus Church and the Chapel of Memories, located on the site of Alavus's first church, are classified as Finland's nationally significant built cultural environments

== Previous parts ==
At the site of the Alavus church, there was first a pulpit, which was completed in 1674. The belfry was completed in 1734. The next church was completed in 1746, and it was probably designed by Henrik Katila from Vöyri. It was replaced in 1825 by a church, which was largely based on the drawings of the Vimpeli church. Juho Kohlström designed the new belfry and completed it at the same time. This third church burned down in 1912, but the church remained. The three candlesticks in the central aisle were also saved, and they are in use in the current church. The oldest candle crown dates from 1828.
