= Erkki Huttunen =

Finnish architect

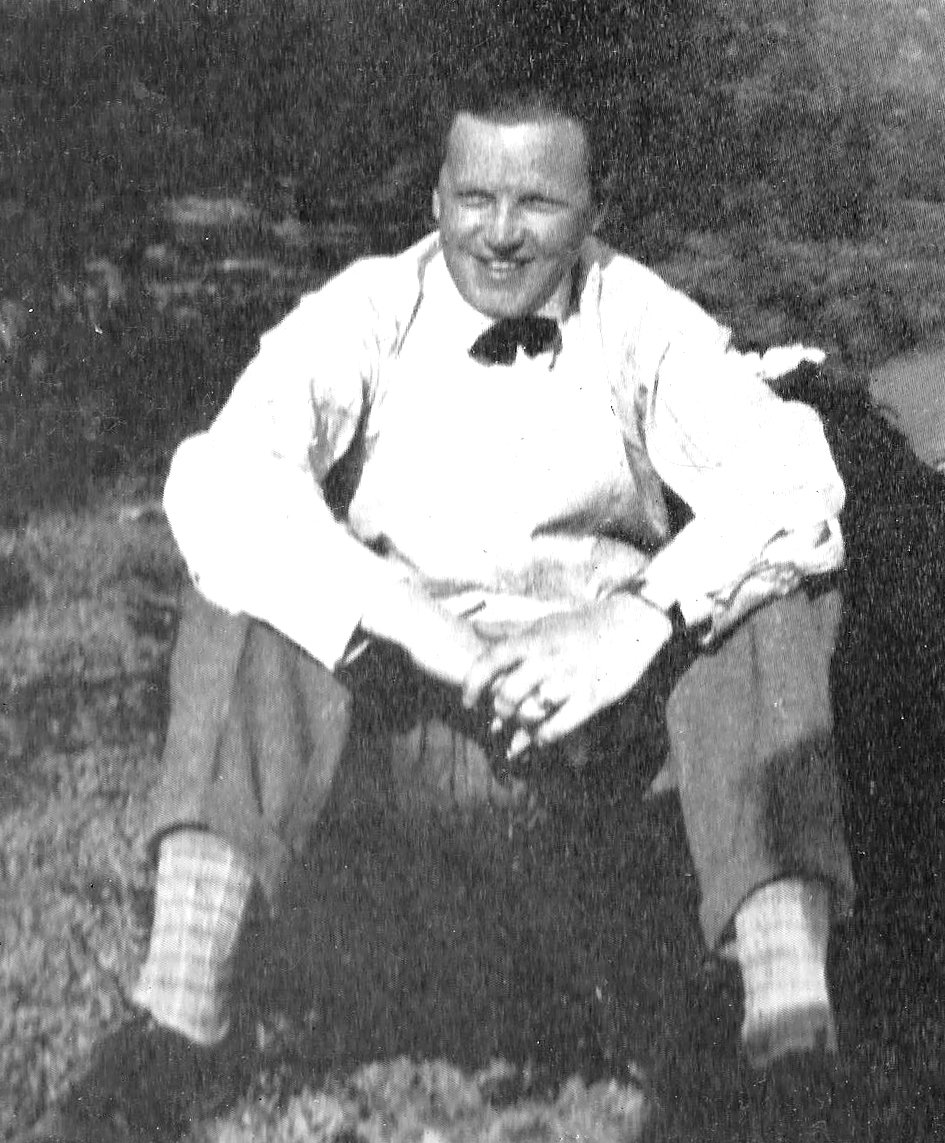
- Born: May 18, 1901; Alavus, Grand Duchy of Finland
- Died: November 17, 1956 (aged 55); Helsinki, Finland
- Occupation: architect

Erkki Juhani Huttunen (18 May 1901 – 17 November 1956) was a Finnish architect known for his Functionalist works. He graduated from the Helsinki University of Technology in 1927.

== Selected works ==
- SOK Toppila Mill, Oulu, 1929
- City Hall, Kotka, 1934
- Nakkila Church, 1937
- Rajamäki Church, 1938
- Hotel Seurahuone, Sortavala, Russia, 1938
- Livonian Culture Centre, Mazirbe, Latvia, 1939
- Sokos Department Store, Helsinki, 1952

== Gallery of works by Erkki Huttunen ==
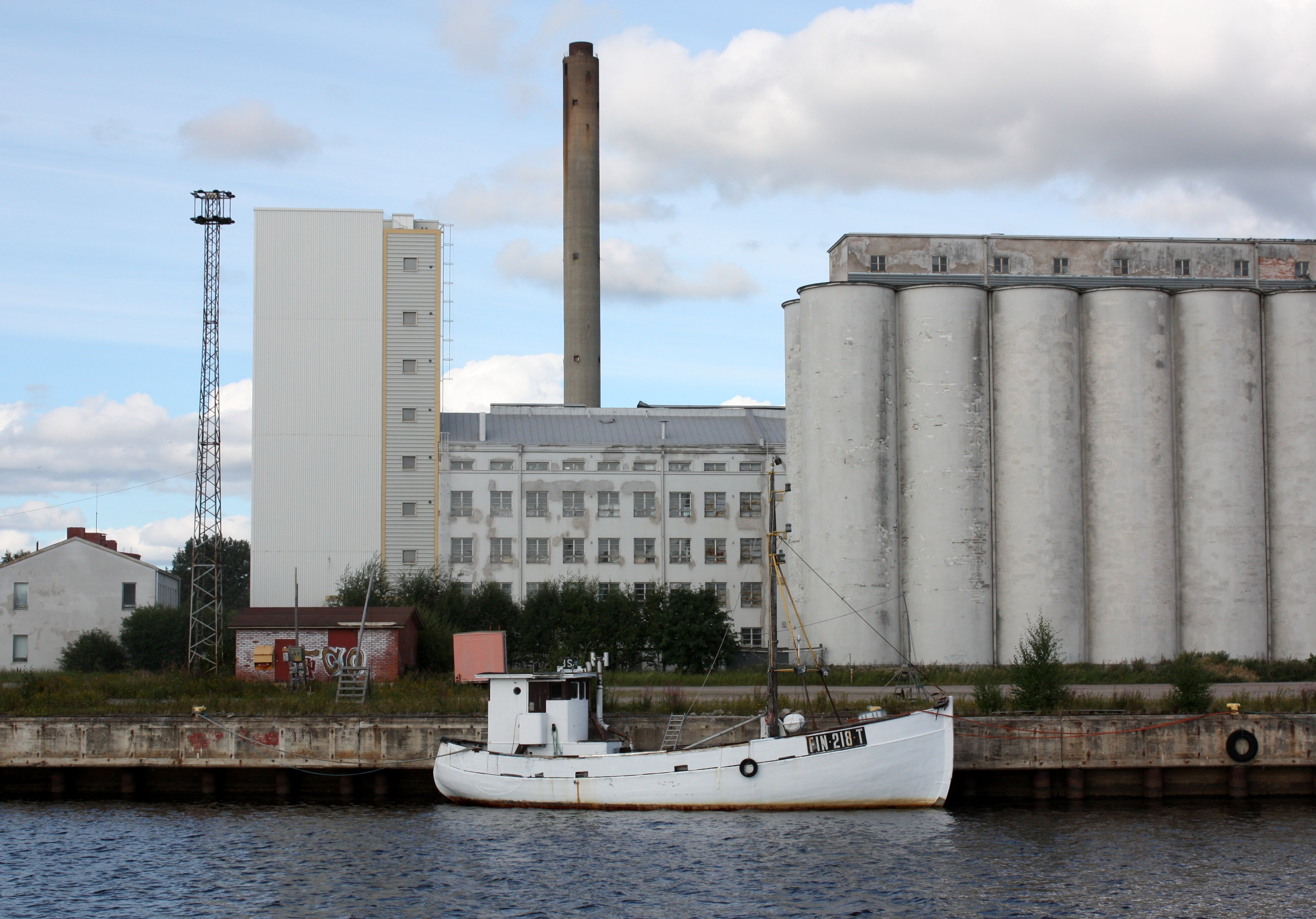
SOK Toppila Mill, 1929.

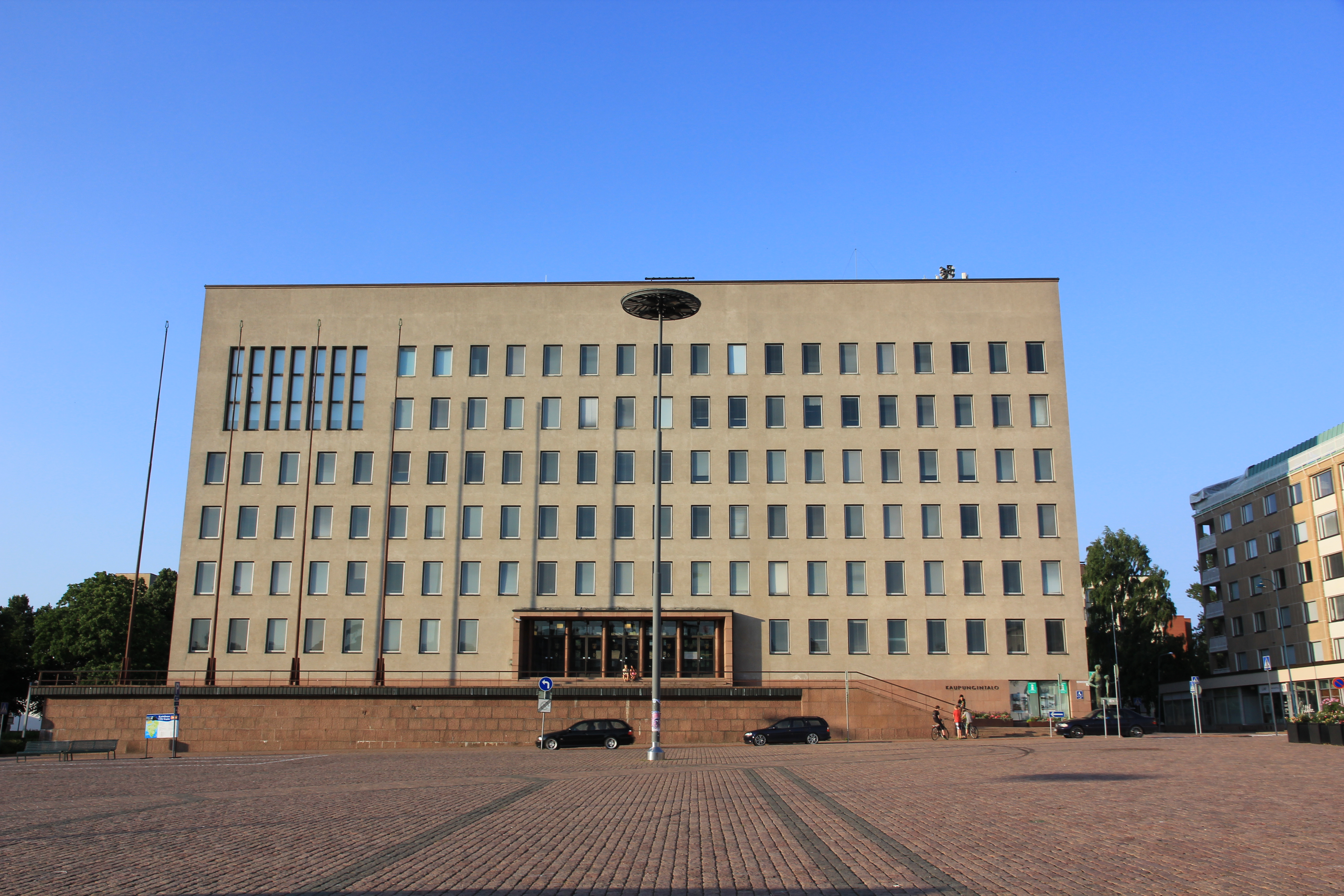
Kotka City Hall, 1934.

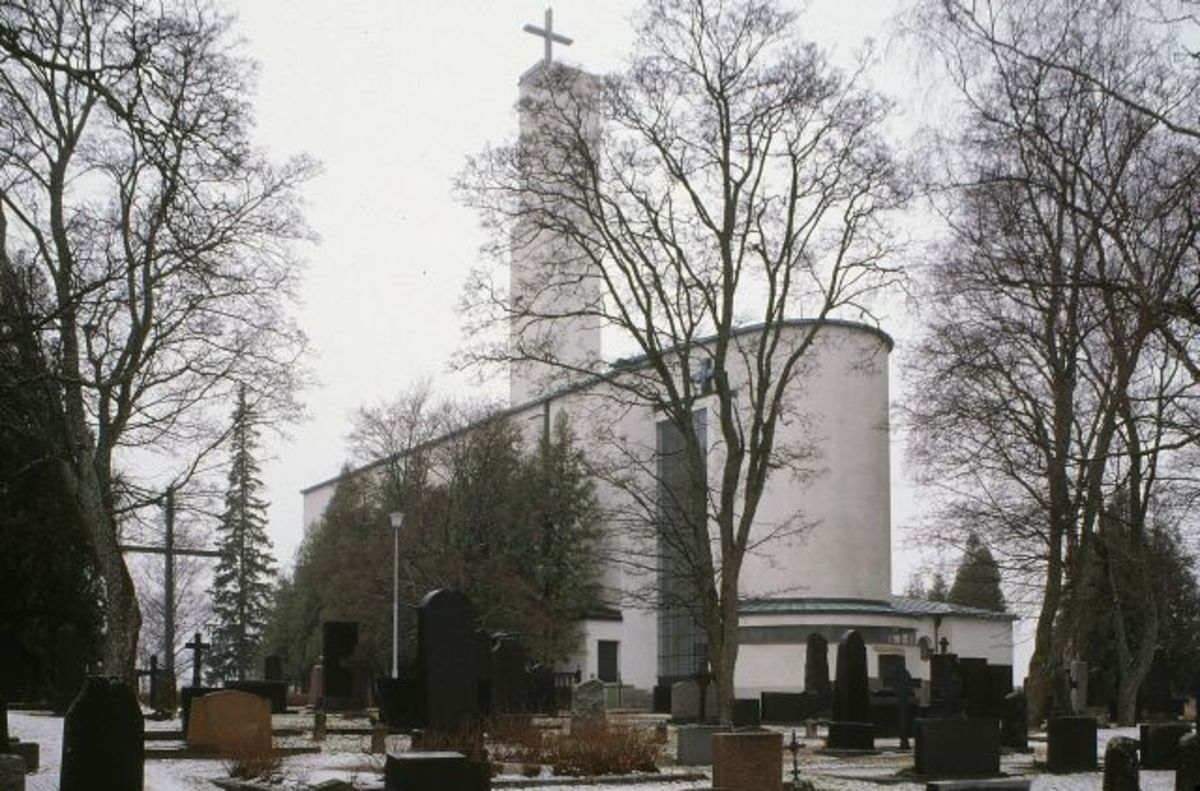
Nakkila Church, 1937.

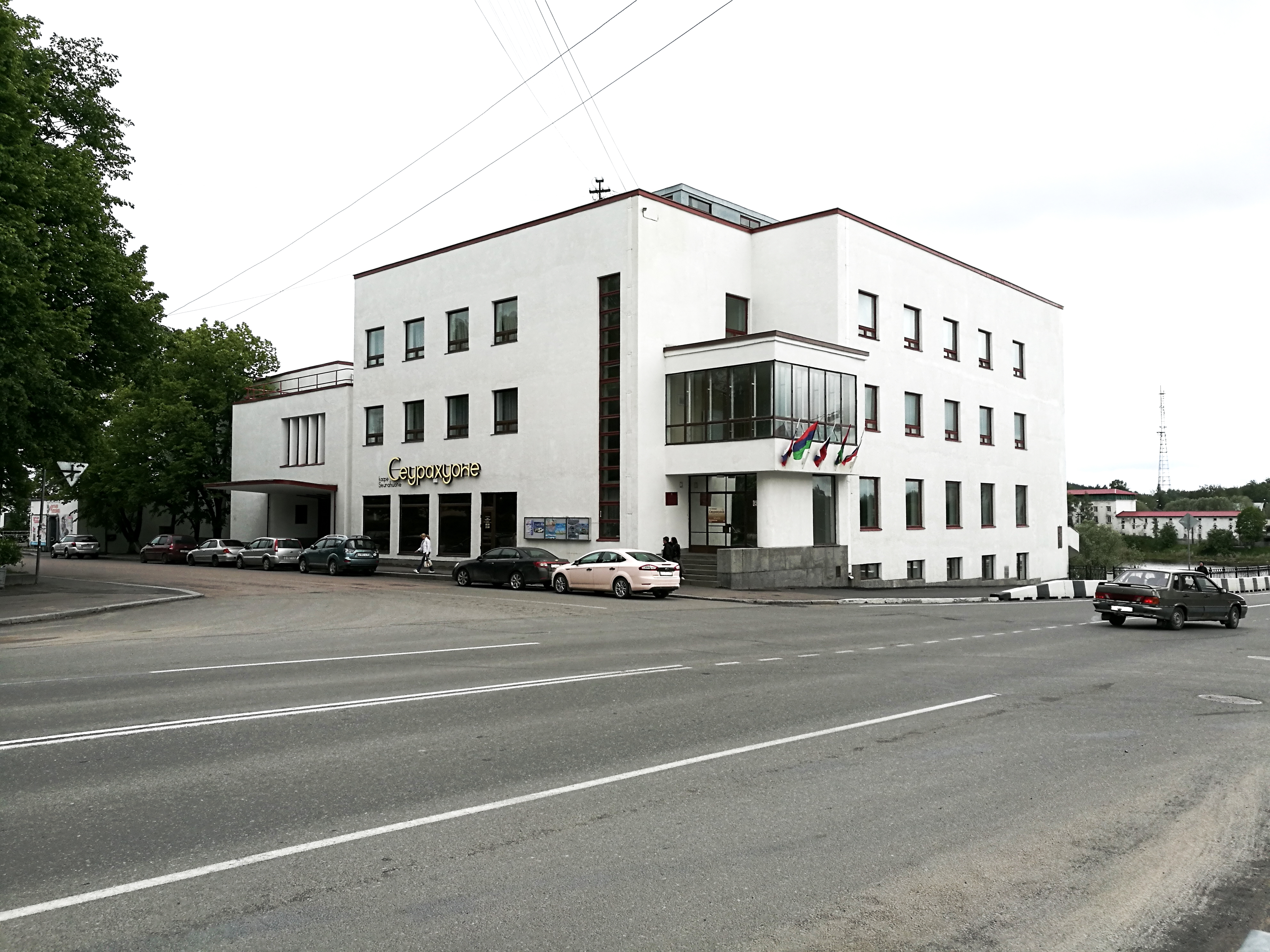
Seurahuone Hotel in Sortavala, 1938.

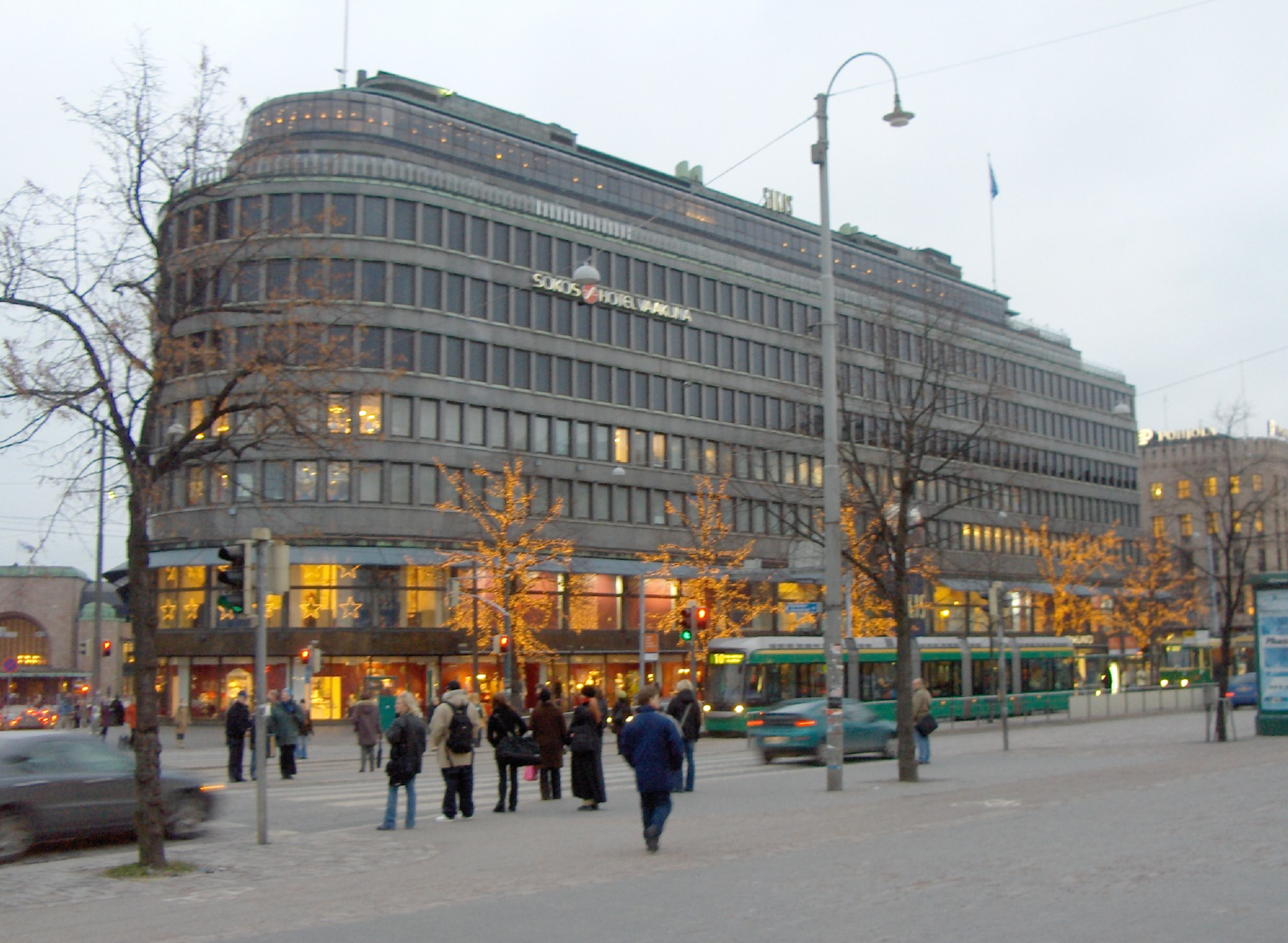
Sokos Department Store, Helsinki, 1952.
