= Rauha S. Virtanen =

Finnish author (1931–2019)

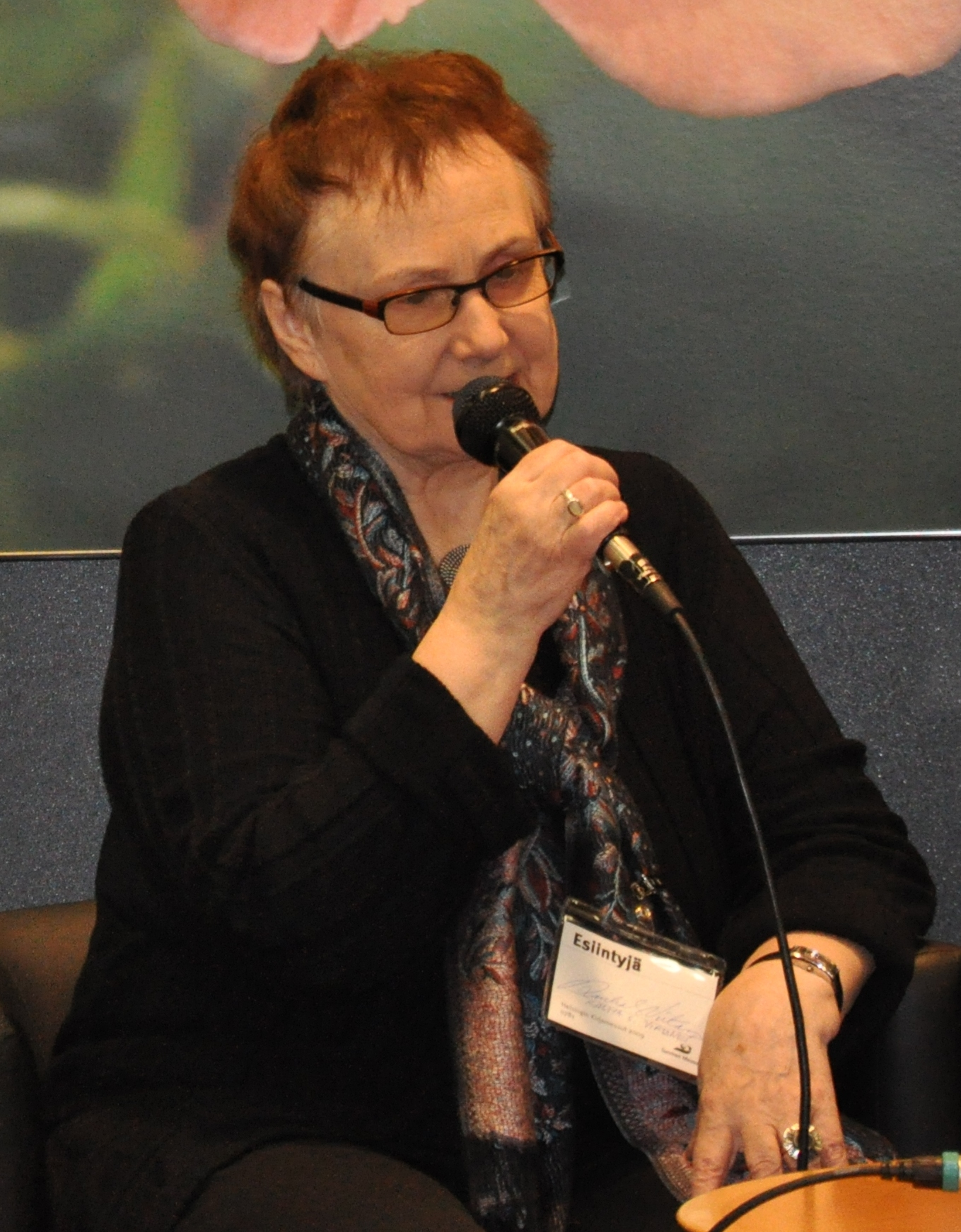
Rauha S. Virtanen, 2009

Rauha S. Virtanen (28 June 1931 – 20 March 2019) was a Finnish author who wrote youth literature as well as plays. Virtanen received numerous literary awards, including the Topelius Prize in 1971, the State Prize for Youth Literature in 1971, and the Tirlittan Prize of the Finnish Writers' Union in 2003.

== Biography ==
Rauha Susanna Virtanen was born in Alavus, 28 June 1931.

Inspired by Lucy Maud Montgomery's novel Emily of New Moon, Virtanen's first work, Seljan tytöt ("Selja's Girls"), appeared in 1955 and became into a four-part series inspired by Louisa M. Alcott's Little Women. In 1968, Ruusunen was turned into a book-based mini-series for Yle TV2, Pieni rakkaustarina ("A Little Love Story"). The novel deals with the relationship between an underage girl and an adult man. Virtanen's early work has humor, excitement and romance, but later productions focused on young people facing difficult solutions who see the social and political realities of their environment.

Virtanen's daughter Arja Pettersson is a theater director. Virtanen died in Helsinki, 20 March 2019.

== Awards ==
- Topelius Prize, 1971
- State Prize for Youth Literature, 1971
- Tirlittan Prize of the Finnish Writers' Union, 2003

== Selected works ==
Novels

- Seljan tytöt. Porvoo: WSOY, 1955.
- Tapaamme Seljalla: Seljan tyttöjen uusia vaiheita. Porvoo: WSOY, 1957.
- Kiurut laulavat. Porvoo: WSOY, 1959.
- Virva Seljan yksityisasia. Porvoo: WSOY, 1960.
- Tuntematon Selja. Helsinki: WSOY, 1964.
- Luumupuu kukkii. Helsinki: WSOY, 1965.
- Tuletko sisarekseni. Helsinki: WSOY, 1966.
- Ruusunen. Helsinki: WSOY, 1968.
- Joulukuusivarkaus. Helsinki: WSOY, 1970.
- Lintu pulpetissa. Helsinki: WSOY, 1972. ISBN 951-0-00680-7.
- Seljalta maailman ääreen. Helsinki: WSOY, 2001. ISBN 951-0-25634-X.
- Seljan Tuli ja Lumi. Helsinki: WSOY, 2009. ISBN 978-951-0-35458-2.

Plays

- Avaruusmekko (1966)
- Tässä on Hely Ahonen (1974)
- Laulukokeet (1976)
- Jääkö Pekka luokalle? (1977)
- Rööki-Rocky (1978)
- Pääsy kielletty (1979)
- Kolme mummoa (1982)
