= Kemppi =

Finnish company

Kemppi Oy
- Industry: Electrical/electronic manufacturing
- Founded: 1949 in Lahti, Finland
- Founder: Martti Kemppi
- Headquarters: Lahti, Finland
- Products: Welding equipment, software and services
- Website: http://www.kemppi.com/

Kemppi Oy is a Finnish company, founded in 1949 by Martti Kemppi. The company is a manufacturer of welding equipment. It is located in Lahti city. The company has subsidiaries in 13 countries, sales offices and retailers in over 70, and its turnover is more than €90 million. Kemppi Oy was formerly known as Veljekset Kemppi Oy and changed its name to Kemppi Oy in 1968. The company has production plants in Lahti region, Finland; and Chennai, India.

Kemppi Oy designs and manufactures arc welding equipment to its customers worldwide. It provides MIG/MAG welding products, such as compact machines, MIG welding sets and guns, and accessories; TIG welding products, including DC and AC/DC TIG welding products, TIG torches, and accessories; MMA welding machines; welding automation products; and accessories, such as welding helmets, panels, monitoring products, remote control units, cables and connectors, hanging devices and swing arms, transport units, and consumable parts. The company also offers welding gun, wire feed mechanism, power source, cooling unit, and TIG welding torch maintenance services. Its products are used in metal fabrication workshops; automotive industry; construction; chemical, process, and oil and gas industries; shipbuilding and offshore; welding automation; and other applications. In recent years the company has also expanded its product lineup into automated welding monitoring, pioneering tools for demanding industrial construction and manufacturing.

== Kempower ==
In addition to its welding equipment business, the Kemppi Group has developed a division dedicated to electric vehicle (EV) charging solutions, known as Kempower. In 1997, Kempower was established as a separate entity, and following a market survey in 2017, the fast charging business was transferred from Kemppi Group to Kempower. Kempower’s systems are designed for outdoor use and heavy-duty conditions, featuring modular charging cabinets with dynamic power distribution that adjusts to the demand of charging vehicles.

== See also ==
- List of Finnish companies
