= Niinimaa =

Village in South Ostrobothnia, Finland

Coordinates: 62.6458°N 23.4016°E

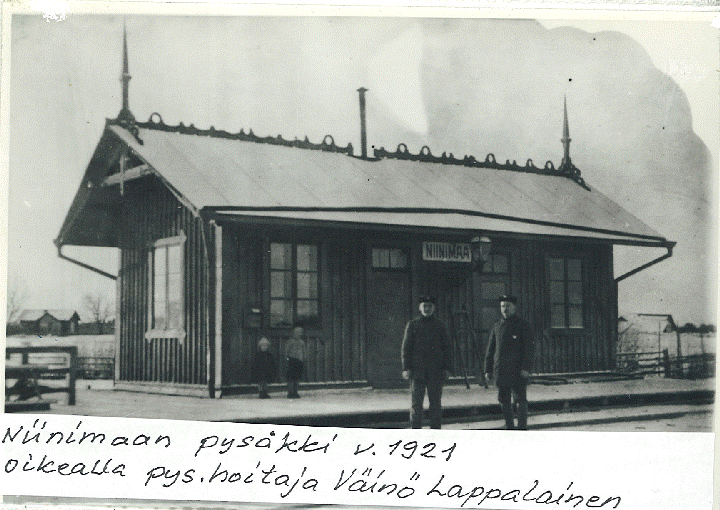
Train station in Niinimaa (1921).

Niinimaa is a small village in the municipality of Alavus, South Ostrobothnia, Finland.
