= List of largest companies in Finland =

This article lists the largest companies in Finland in terms of their revenue, net profit and total assets, according to the American business magazines Fortune and Forbes.

== 2021 Fortune list ==
This list displays all Finnish companies in the Fortune Global 500, which ranks the world's largest companies by annual revenue. The figures below are given in millions of US dollars and are for the fiscal year 2020. Also listed are the headquarters location, net profit, number of employees worldwide and industry sector of each company.

| Rank | Fortune 500 rank | Name | Industry | Revenue (USD millions) | Profits (USD millions) | Employees | Headquarters |
|---|---|---|---|---|---|---|---|
| 1 | 186 | Fortum | Electricity | 55,850 | 2,077 | 19,933 | Espoo |
| 2 | 485 | Nokia | Technology | 24,899 | −2,875 | 92,039 | Espoo |

== 2026 Forbes Global 2000 list ==
This list is based on the Forbes Global 2000, which ranks the world's 2,000 largest publicly traded companies. The Forbes list takes into account a multitude of factors, including the revenue, net profit, total assets and market value of each company; each factor is given a weighted rank in terms of importance when considering the overall ranking. The table below also lists the headquarters location and industry sector of each company. The figures are in billions of US dollars and are for the year 2026. All 9 companies from Finland are listed.

| Rank | Forbes 2000 rank | Name | Headquarters | Revenue (billions US$) | Profit (billions US$) | Assets (billions US$) | Value (billions US$) | Industry | Ref. |
|---|---|---|---|---|---|---|---|---|---|
| 1 | 181 | Nordea | Helsinki | 30.2 | 5.5 | 782.4 | 60.8 | Banking | |
| 2 | 571 | Nokia | Espoo | 23.2 | 0.9 | 43.0 | 77.4 | Technology | |
| 3 | 707 | Sampo | Helsinki | 13.6 | 1.9 | 30.7 | 27.7 | Insurance | |
| 4 | 884 | Neste | Espoo | 22.2 | 0.8 | 20.8 | 25.5 | Oil & gas | |
| 5 | 993 | Kone | Espoo | 13.1 | 1.1 | 10.2 | 30.7 | Construction | |
| 6 | 1365 | UPM-Kymmene | Helsinki | 11.0 | 0.6 | 20.5 | 15.4 | Materials | |
| 7 | 1403 | Fortum | Espoo | 6.2 | 1.0 | 18.4 | 21.1 | Utilities | |
| 8 | 1405 | Wärtsilä | Helsinki | 8.0 | 0.8 | 9.5 | 23.6 | Capital goods | |
| 9 | 1562 | Stora Enso | Helsinki | 10.8 | 0.7 | 21.7 | 8.7 | Materials | |

== See also ==
- List of companies of Finland
- List of largest companies by revenue
