= Tuuri =

Village in South Ostrobothnia, Finland

Coordinates: 62°36′N 23°45′E

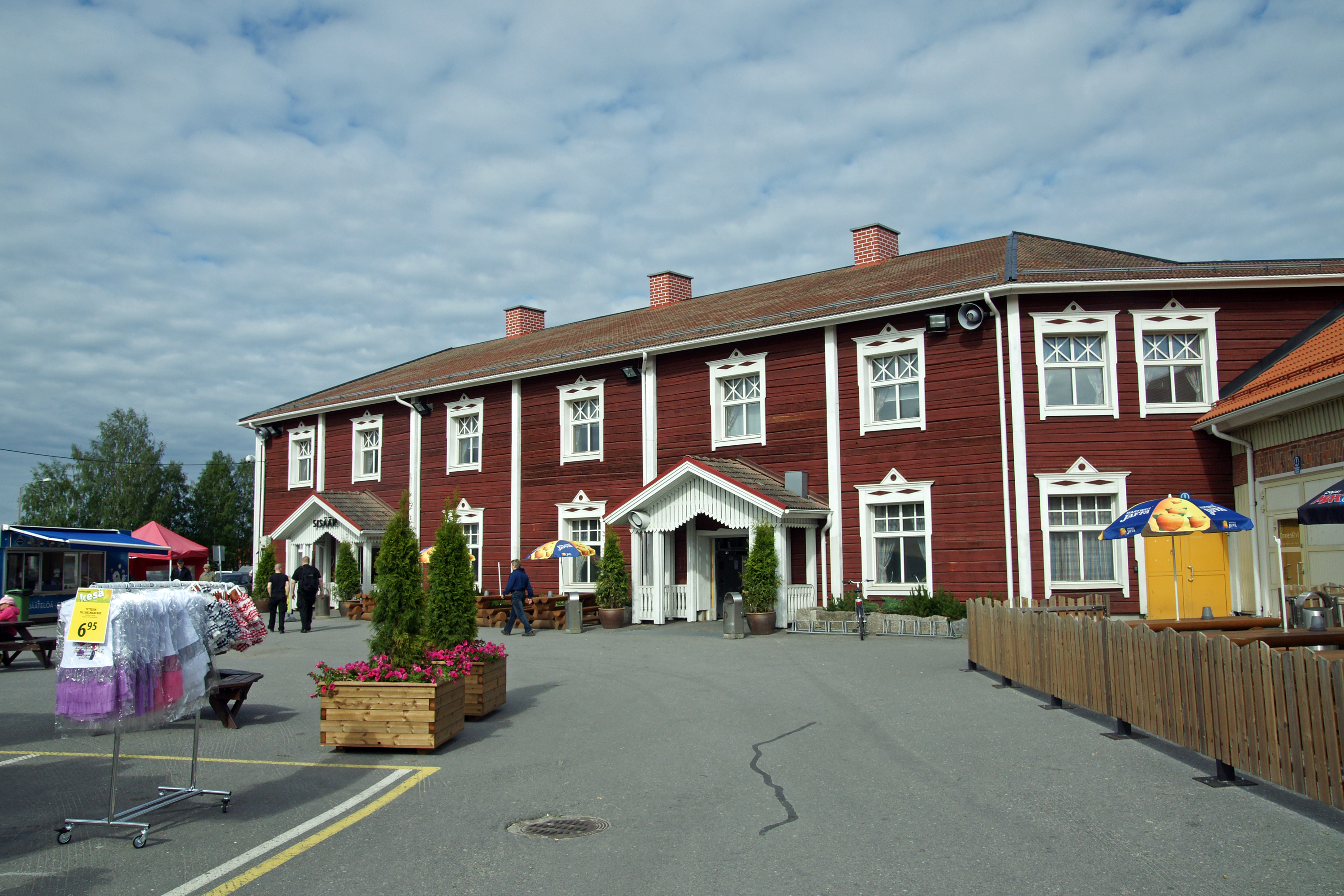
Veljekset Keskinen department store in Tuuri

Tuuri is a village in Töysä, since 2013 part of Alavus, a town of Finland. It is located in the province of Western Finland and is part of the South Ostrobothnia region. The village has a population of 500. In Modern Finnish the appellative tuuri means 'luck'.

The village is known for the second biggest department store in Finland, Veljekset Keskinen. The massive golden horseshoe erected over the shopping mall stands at number three in Reuters' list of world's ugliest buildings and monuments.

== See also ==
- Miljoona Rock
