= Villilä Manor =

Coordinates: 61°21′42″N 22°00′04″E

- Villilän kartano
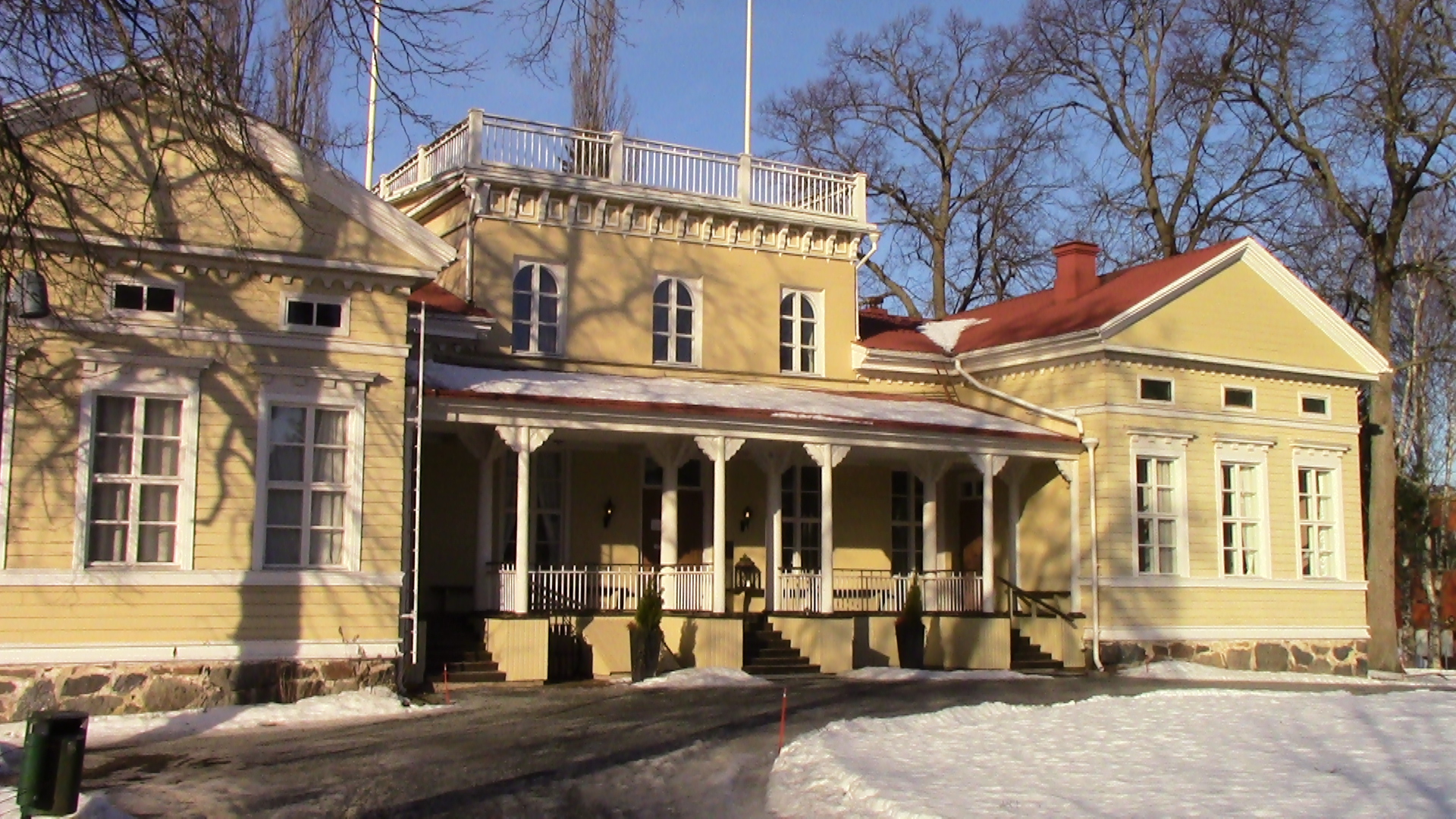
- Main building from the front

General information
- Town or city: Nakkila
- Country: Finland
- Completed: 1852 (current main building); 1450s (first known mention of the manor)

Villilä manor (Fin: Villilän kartano) is a manor in Nakkila. It is located right next to central Nakkila, close to valtatie 2 and the Tampere-Pori railway. Villilä studios have been operating in the next to the manor since 2003. The studio premises themselves are located in the former outbuildings of the manor, the main building of the manor serves as accommodation and restaurant facilities.

== History ==
The first known mention of Villilä Manor is from the 1450s, when the inhabitants of the village of Villiö in Kokemäki established a croft on the site. At the beginning of the 17th century, the three tax farms located on the site merged into a manor, which was given in 1638 as a county to Michell von Jordan, the governor of Vyborg and Savonlinna counties. It was under the control of the Jordan family until 1788. The owner was then the Avellan family until 1888, after which the manor was sold to Frans Stefanus Pohjala.

In 1905, a livestock school owned by the Satakunta Agricultural Group started operating in the manor. After the Civil War, 20 crofts and later 12 more settlements were separated from the manor's lands. After the death of Frans Pohjala's daughter Emma Grönlundl in 1969, the manor passed into the ownership of the municipality of Nakkila in 1971, which then sold it to the Nakkilan konepaja in 1976. In 2002, the municipality bought the manor back and renovated its cinema center. Eight hectares of land were also transferred to the municipality in the transaction. In 2003, the manor's main building, accommodation building, sauna and summer café building were leased to Villilän Kartanonrouvat Oy. From the beginning of 2018, musician Sani Aartela became the tenant of the manor's accommodation and restaurant premises.

Arantila and Lattomeri schools, a sports center and the Arantila bridge have been built on the land donated by the manor in Nakkila. Kirkonseudun koulu and Pappila are also former lands of the manor.

== Buildings ==
The current main building of Villilä Manor was completed in 1852. It was designed by Anders Fredrik Granstedt, a student of Carl Ludvig Engel, who died three years before the building was completed. The two-storey Empire-style main building has a total of 17 rooms. The manor's park was designed in the 1930s by Paul Olsson, a garden architect who studied in Germany. The park was renovated in the 1980s.

In addition to the main building, the area includes a two-story stable building designed by Sigurd Frosterus and Ole Gripenberg in 1925, a red-brick barn completed in 1864, and a two-story house built as a dormitory for animal husbandry. When completed, the barn was the largest in Finland. It is over 60 meters long and 21 meters wide. The dormitory was built in 1935 according to the plans of architect Heikki Tiitola. There is also a granary designed by Ola Gripenberg, completed in 1925, and a garage and pump room designed by Uno Sjöstöm in 1922.

== Sources ==
Villilä manor's homepage (translated to english)
