= Veljekset Keskinen =

Department store in Tuuri, Alavus, Finland

Coordinates: 62°36′09″N 023°43′36″E

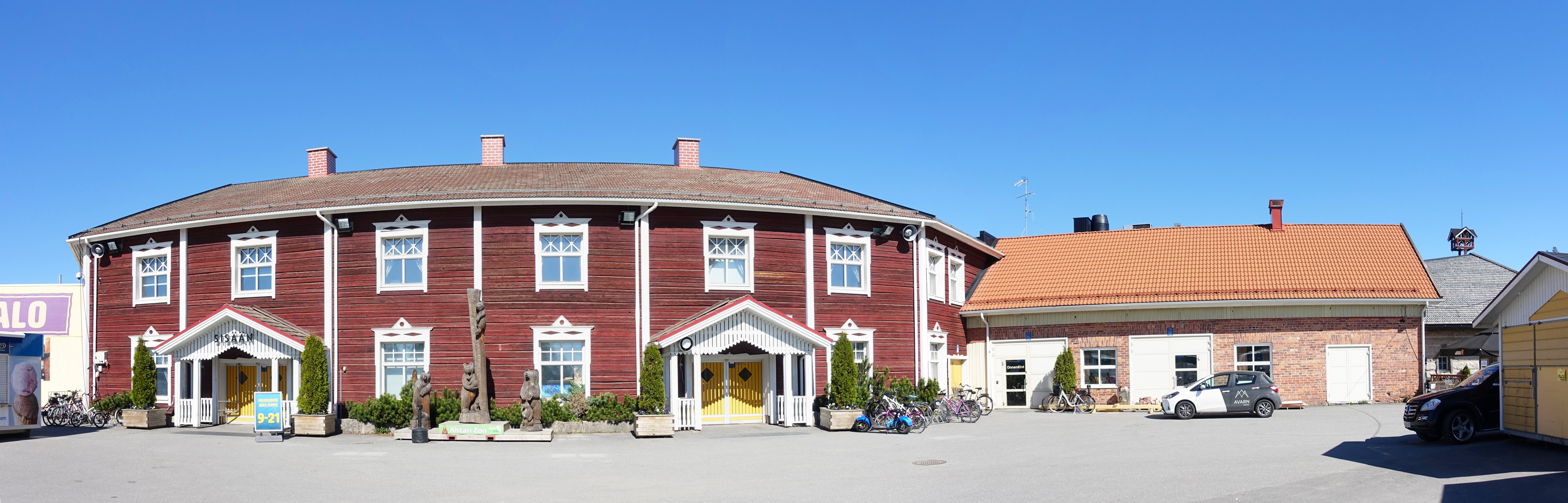
Veljekset Keskinen

Veljekset Keskinen Oy (Keskinen Brothers) is a department store in Tuuri, Alavus, Finland. In addition to the General Store and the Food Store, the shopping center includes Hotel OnnenTähti, the Onnela caravan park, the Village Store Gas Station, restaurant services and in the summer, a yard sale. Outside entrepreneurs operate on Kauppakatu. Over the years, a shopping village of dozens of companies has grown around the Village Store.

The current shopkeeper, Vesa Keskinen, is a fifth-generation merchant.

The store receives over 6 million customers per year, and is the largest department store in Finland. It is a tourist attraction as well as a regular department store. The store has been expanded several times. The most recent expansion of 5,000 square meters was completed in 2016, and in June 2017, the Kauppakatu, which connects the Department Store and the Grocery Store, was opened.

There is a large horse shoe at the parking area, as the name of the village ("Tuuri") means "luck" in Finnish; it stands at number three in Reuters' list of world's ugliest buildings and monuments.

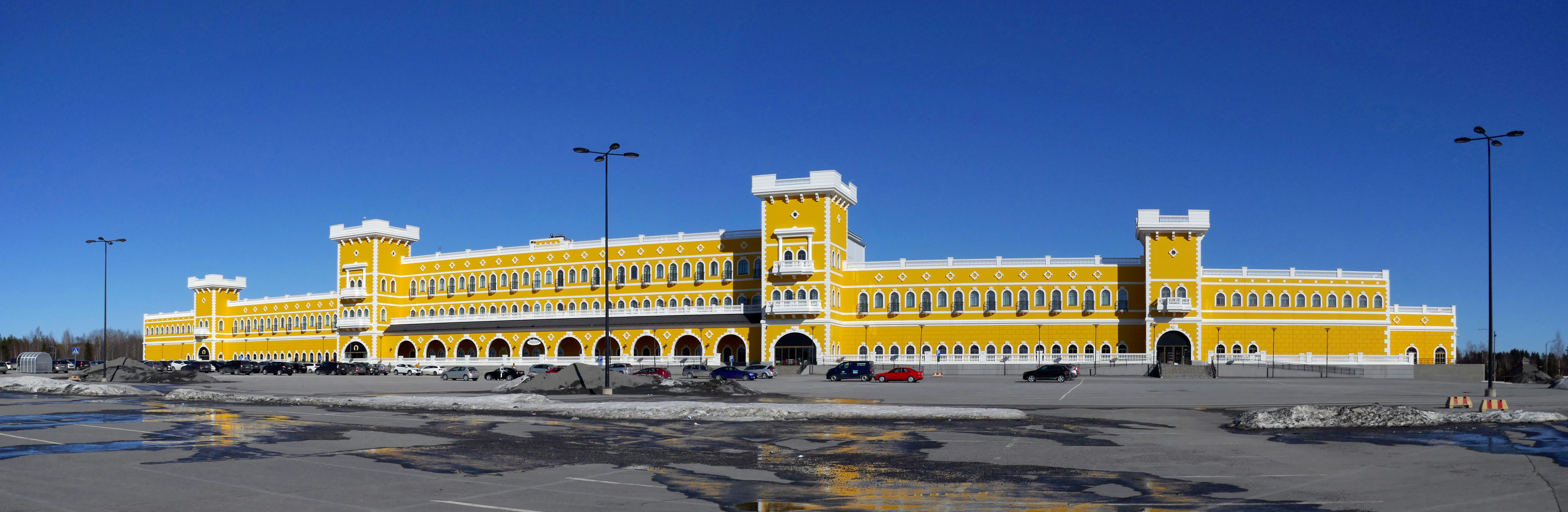
Veljekset Keskinen's food shop.

== History ==
Toivo Keskinen established a permanent store in Tuuri in 1946, which moved to its current location in 1969. In 1976, his sons, Matti and Mikko Keskinen, purchased his business, at which point the company was named Veljekset Keskinen Oy (Keskinen Brothers Ltd). In 1986, Mikko Keskinen sold his share of the village shop to his brother Matti. Matti's son, Vesa Keskinen, began working at the village shop in 1987 and became the CEO in 1994.

In 2003, Keskinen announced his plans to triple the sales area of Veljekset Keskinen. A castle-like facade facing west was built for the building, which was named OnnenLinna (Castle of Luck). The facade is 250 meters wide, the doorway is 8 meters high, and the highest point reaches 33.86 meters.

The department store received a new facade in 2016. The building is 96 meters wide and 18 meters high at its tallest point. The primary color is Royal Blue.

== Events and Experiences ==
The store organizes various events in the area or its vicinity. The largest events have included the Miljoona Rock music festival, the Miljoona Pilkki ice fishing competition, and various charity events. Currently, the biggest event is known as Miljoona Tivoli funfair, which is run on the shop grounds during the summer by Tivoli Sariola. Miljoona Tivoli is free of charge for children under 13.

The area also features the OnnenKenkä (Lucky Shoe) monument, OnnenSilta (Lucky Bridge), various statues, Moomin mug and coffee cup collections, a Nokia phone collection, a Lego miniature model of the Village Shop, and the Markan Tarina (Story of the Markka) coin room (Finland's largest displayed collection of Finnish currency used between 1860 and 2002).

The area contains various playgrounds, a Moomin playground, and the free Riemu Park indoor adventure park. A minigolf course is available during the summer. The area also features a skate park maintained by the city of Alavus.
