= Saarioinen =

Finnish food industry company

Saarioinen Oy
- Company type: Limited company (osakeyhtiö)
- Industry: Food industry
- Founded: 1955; 70 years ago in Finland
- Headquarters: Tampere, Finland
- Areas served: Finland
- Products: Food products
- Revenue: 257 million euros (2022)
- Number of employees: 1,236 (2022)
- Website: www.saarioinen.fi

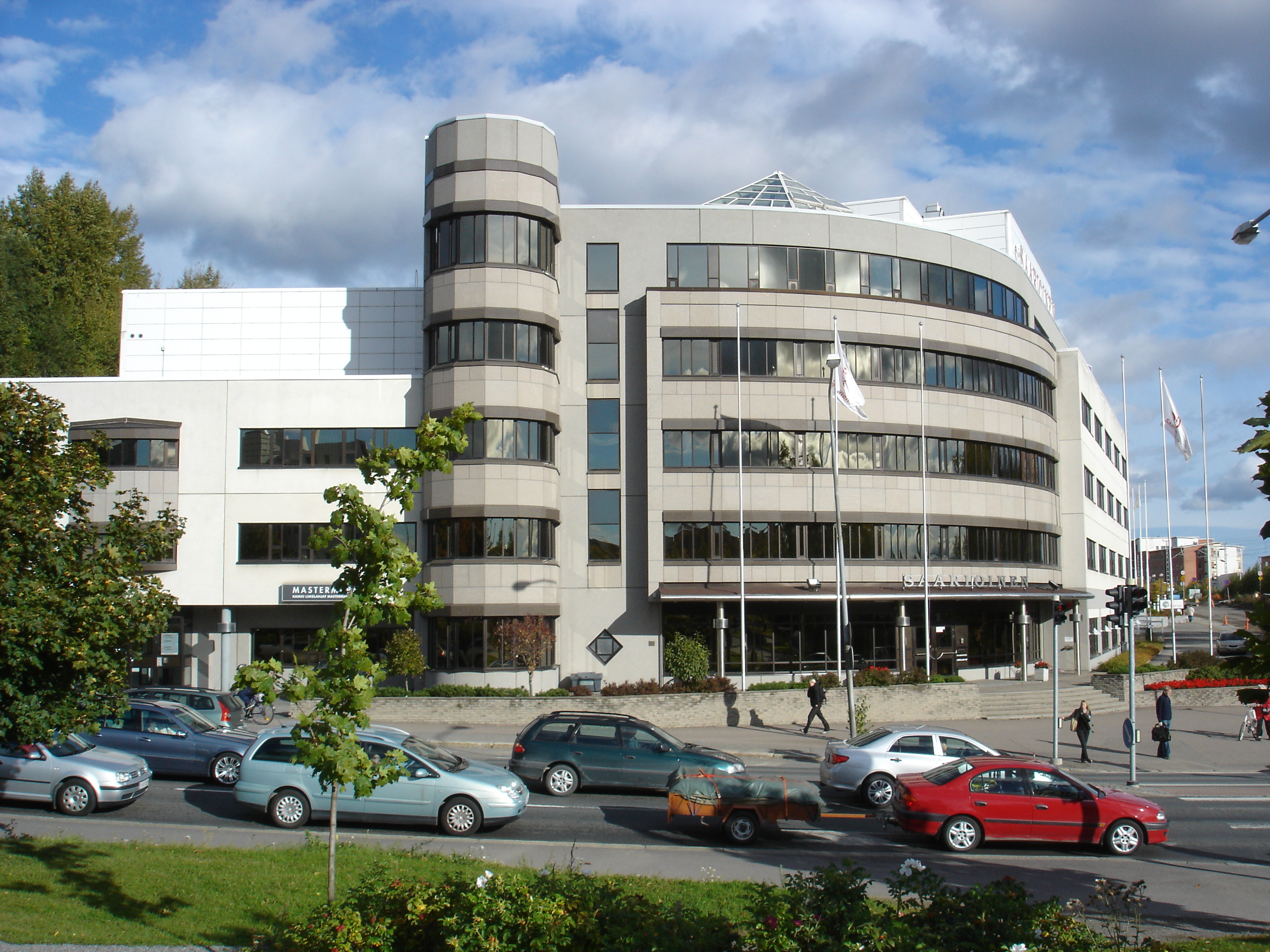
Saarioinen head office in Tampere, photographed in September 2007.

Saarioinen Oy is a Finnish concern in the foodstuff industry. It has activities in Huittinen, Kangasala, Valkeakoski in Finland and in Rapla in Estonia.

== History ==
Reino A. Avonius, the master of the Saarioinen manor in Sahalahti started a henhouse in 1945. The idea was to breed chickens for other henkeepers to use for breeding more chickens. The demand for animals was great, and in the early 1950s the farm had grown to the largest in the Nordic countries by area. In 1947 the garden Saarioisten Taimisto was founded in the farm, with the manure coming from the farm's own henhouse. In 1948 the farm started selling plant nutrients and manure to consumers as Humus products. The next year, the farm started farming minks and Arctic foxes. In the early 1950s the farm started producing canned vegetables, the first farm in Finland to do so at an industrial scale. The product line was soon joined by berry and fruit purees and juices and food conservation agents aimed at consumers. From 1946 the farm also grew tobacco, the tobacco company Oy Panama Tobacco Co stayed in business until 1967.

As production increased, the farm activity was incorporated in 1955 and Saarioinen Oy was founded. In 1957 the company started producing convenience food and two years later it started brewing broilers. From early on, the best selling convenience food was liver casserole. When Reino Avonius died in 1967, his brother Pentti Avonius succeeded him as company CEO. In 1969, a Saarioinen convenience food factory was founded in Sahalahti, which was the largest convenience food factory in Finland at the time. Production increased quickly: in 1972 a canned food factory was founded in Huittinen and in 1976 a poultry slaughterhouse in Sahalahti. In the 1970s Saarioinen had conquered a third of the convenience food market in Finland. The company moved to the meat food industry by buying the Mestari Pedersen sausage factory in 1984.

In 1991 Saarioinen moved its operations to Tampere, where a new head office was constructed. In the next year the company was changed into a concern: the production was split to separate companies Ruoka-Saarioinen Oy (meals), Saarioisten Säilyke Oy (canned produce), Liha-Saarioinen Oy (meat) and Saarioisten Taimistot Oy (plants). Erkki Isokangas was appointed CEO of the parent company Saarioinen Oy. In 1995 production of meat moved to Valkeakoski. In 1997 Saarioinen bought the ice cream factory Oy Sun Ice Ab from Jakobstad, which it later sold to Ingman Foods in 2002.

The company expanded into export activity: in 1995 Saarioinen Eesti OÜ was founded in Estonia, and the company later bought an Estonian convenience food factory. A couple of years later the company started exporting convenience food to Sweden and opened an office in Moscow, Russia. Saarioinen does not have export activity any more.

Erkki Isokangas retired in 2005. Ilkka Mäkelä was appointed as the new CEO.

Juhani Avotie, son of Saarioinen chairman of the board Pentti Avonius died in a free-time accident in Sahalahti in Kangasala on 4 December 2010.

In early 2011 the companies Ruoka-Saarioinen, Liha-Saarioinen, Saarioisten Lihanjalostus, Saarioisten Keskuslähettämö, Saarioisten Säilyke and Kiinteistö Oy Sahalahden Isoniementie 76 were fused back to the parent company Saarioinen Oy. In early 2012 the former parent company Artekno Oy and Artekno-Eps Oy were fused into Artekno-Pur Oy, which was renamed Artekno Oy. It is a multi-purpose industry subcontractor in Kangasala and Luopioinen in Pälkäne, producing food packaging and food logistics solutions as well as the Pallotuoli design chair and other plastic furniture designed by Eero Aarnio.

Ilkka Mäkelä retired in 2016. Matti Karppinen was appointed as the new CEO.

== Parent company ==
Saarioinen Oy is owned by the holding company Artekno-Saarioinen Oy.

Harri Bister, CEO of Artekno-PUR Oy replaced Juhani Avotie as CEO of Artekno Oy. Juhani Avotie's sister Kaisu Avotie was appointed as chairman of the board of Saarioinen Oy, also present at the board of Artekno Oy.

== Production facilities ==
Saarioinen has production facilities at three places in Finland as well as a daughter company in Estonia.

- Huittinen: salads, porridges, kissels, jams, marmalades and salad dressings.
- Kangasala: pastas, frittelse, traditional casseroles, pots, soups and portion meals, steaks, balls and loafs both cooked and frozen, as well as roasted poultry.
- Valkeakoski: pizzas, meat doughnuts, Karelian pies with rice, meat products and roasted meat. A central warehouse handling all of Saarioinen's fresh products.
- Rapla, Estonia: salads, sandwiches, pancakes, pastas, frittelses, soups and portion meals to the Estonian market. "Eväs" brand products to the Finnish market.

== Bibliography ==
- Avotie, Kaisu: Kartanosta elintarvikekonserniksi. WSOY 2011. ISBN 9789510382585.
