= Jesse Laaksonen =

Finnish ice hockey player (born 1989)

- Born: 1 March 1989 (age 36) Nakkila
- Position: Forward
- Shot: Right
- Played for: Porin Ässät; Heinolan Peliitat; Vaasan Sport; SaPKo; HC Satakunta; KK-V; Karhu HT (S-S); Karhu HT II (2-Div.)
- Playing career: 2009–2020

Jesse Laaksonen (born 1 March 1989) is a Finnish former professional ice hockey forward who last played for Karhu HT II (Note: Karhu HT II is an affiliate team of Karhu HT) of the 2. Divisioona.
