= Alavus =

Alavus Alavo
- Town
- Alavuden kaupunki Alavo stad
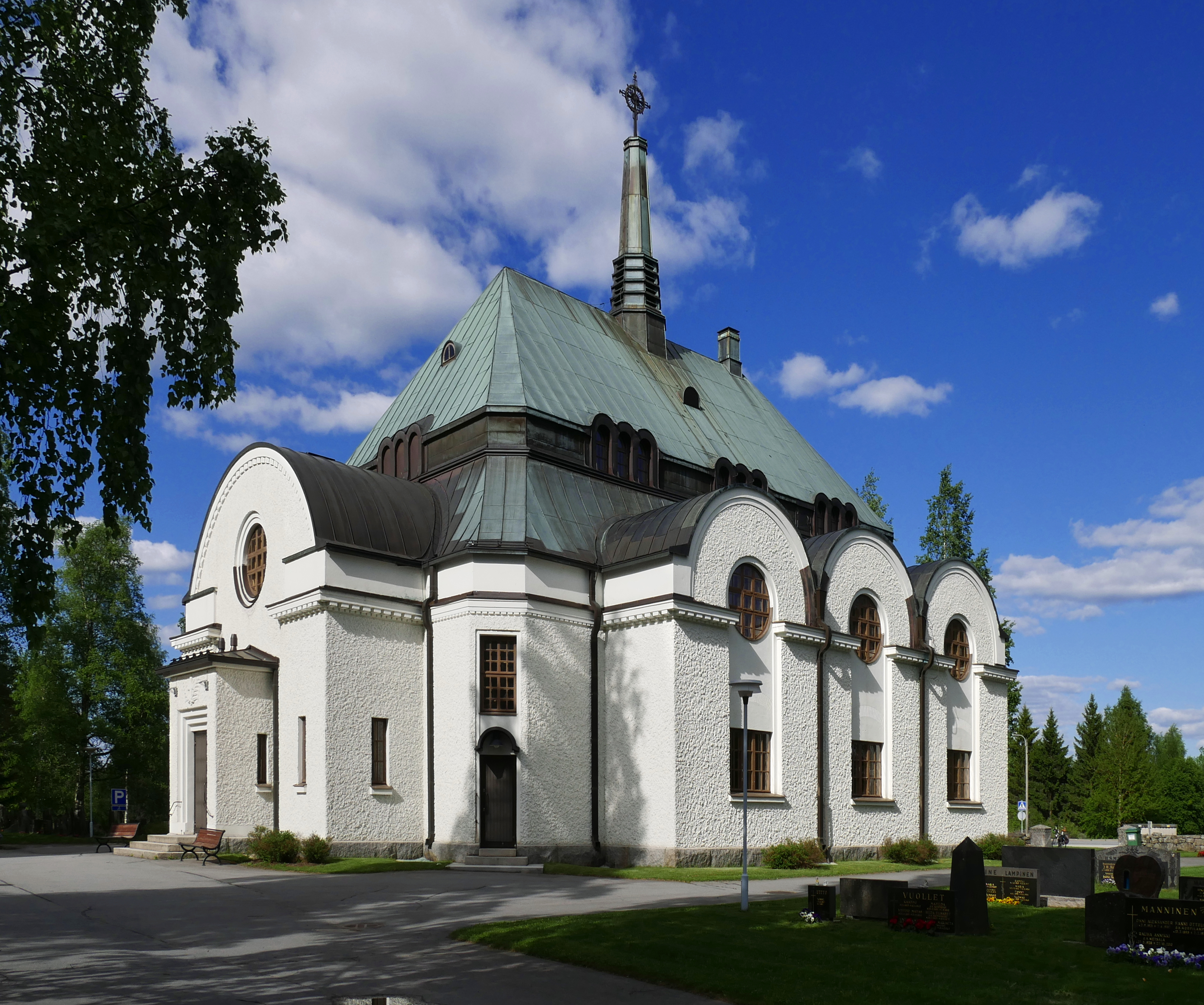
- Alavus Church

- Coat of arms

- Location of Alavus in Finland
- Interactive map of Alavus
- Coordinates: 62°35.5′N 023°37′E
- Country: Finland
- Region: South Ostrobothnia
- Sub-region: Kuusiokunnat
- Charter: 1865
- Market town: 1974
- Town privileges: 1977

Government
  - Town manager: Timo Saari

Area (2018-01-01)
  - Total: 1,151.46 km^{2} (444.58 sq mi)
  - Land: 1,087.23 km^{2} (419.78 sq mi)
  - Water: 52.31 km^{2} (20.20 sq mi)
  - Rank: 71st largest in Finland

Population (2025-12-31)
  - Total: 10,634
  - Rank: 90th largest in Finland
  - Density: 9.78/km^{2} (25.3/sq mi)

Population by native language
  - Finnish: 97.4% (official)
  - Others: 2.6%

Population by age
  - 0 to 14: 16.7%
  - 15 to 64: 54.6%
  - 65 or older: 28.7%
- Time zone: UTC+02:00 (EET)
  - Summer (DST): UTC+03:00 (EEST)
- Website: www.alavus.fi

Alavus (Swedish: Alavo) is a town and municipality of Finland in the province of Western Finland. Part of the South Ostrobothnia region, it is located 52 kilometres (32 mi) southeast of Seinäjoki, 138 kilometres (86 mi) north of Tampere and 319 kilometres (198 mi) north of Helsinki. The town has a population of 10,634 (31 December 2025) and covers an area of 1,151.46 square kilometres (444.58 sq mi) of which 52.31 km^{2} (20.20 sq mi) is water. The population density is 9.78 inhabitants per square kilometre (25.3/sq mi). Neighbouring municipalities are Alajärvi, Kuortane, Seinäjoki, Virrat and Ähtäri.

Agriculture and forestry employ a significant share of the population. Most of the industry in Alavus is related to construction: materials, design and contractors. Alavus has 60 lakes with 324 kilometres (201 mi) of shoreline. The town is unilingually Finnish.

== Geography ==
=== Villages ===
In 1967, Alavus had five legally recognized villages (henkikirjakylät):

- Alavus
- Rantatöysä
- Sapsalampi
- Sulkava
- Sydänmaa

== Demographics ==
In 2020, 16.7% of the population of Alavus was under the age of 15, 54.6% were aged 15 to 64, and 28.7% were over the age of 64. The average age was 46.1, above the national average of 43.4 and regional average of 44.7. Speakers of Finnish made up 98.3% of the population and speakers of Swedish made up 0.1%, while the share of speakers of foreign languages was 1.6%. Foreign nationals made up 1.2% of the total population.

The chart below, describing the development of the total population of Alavus from 1975 to 2020, encompasses the municipality's area as of 2021.

Historical population

Year	Pop.	±% p.a.
1975	13,465	—
1980	13,580	+0.17%
1985	13,781	+0.29%
1990	13,785	+0.01%
1995	13,472	−0.46%
2000	13,135	−0.51%

Year	Pop.	±% p.a.
2005	12,868	−0.41%
2010	12,439	−0.68%
2015	12,044	−0.64%
2020	11,332	−1.21%
2024	10,780	−1.24%

Source: Statistics Finland

=== Urban areas ===
In 2019, out of the total population of 6,919, 4,485 people lived in urban areas and 3,641 in sparsely populated areas, while the coordinates of 64 people were unknown. This made Alavus's degree of urbanization 60.7%. The urban population in the municipality was divided between three urban areas as follows:

#	Urban area	Population
1	Alavus central locality	4,004
2	Alavus railway station area	0
3	Töysä parish village	898
4	Tuuri	777

== Economy ==
In 2018, 9.1% of the workforce of Alavus worked in primary production (agriculture, forestry and fishing), 24.0% in secondary production (e.g. manufacturing, construction and infrastructure), and 65.6% in services. In 2019, the unemployment rate was 8.5%, and the share of pensioners in the population was 33.0%.

The ten largest employers in Alavus in 2019 were as follows:

1. Kuusiolinna Terveys Oy, 551 employees
2. Town of Alavus, 518 employees
3. Veljekset Keskinen Oy, 346 employees
4. Alavus Ikkunat Oy, 100 employees
5. Riikku Group Oy, 96 employees
6. Mattiovi Oy, 90 employees
7. Etelä-Pohjanmaan Osuuskauppa, 64 employees
8. Kuusiokuntien sosiaali -ja terveyskuntayhtymä, 58 employees
9. Normek Oy, 56 employees
10. Alavuden Betoni Oy, 52 employees

== Notable people ==
- Mimmi Bähr (1844–1923), Finnish inventor and developer of calligraphy.
- Erkki Huttunen (1901–1956), architect
- Rauha S. Virtanen (1931–2019), author

== See also ==
- Battle of Alavus
- Niinimaa
- Tuuri
