= Nakkila Church =

- Finnish: Nakkilan kirkko Swedish: Nakkila kyrka
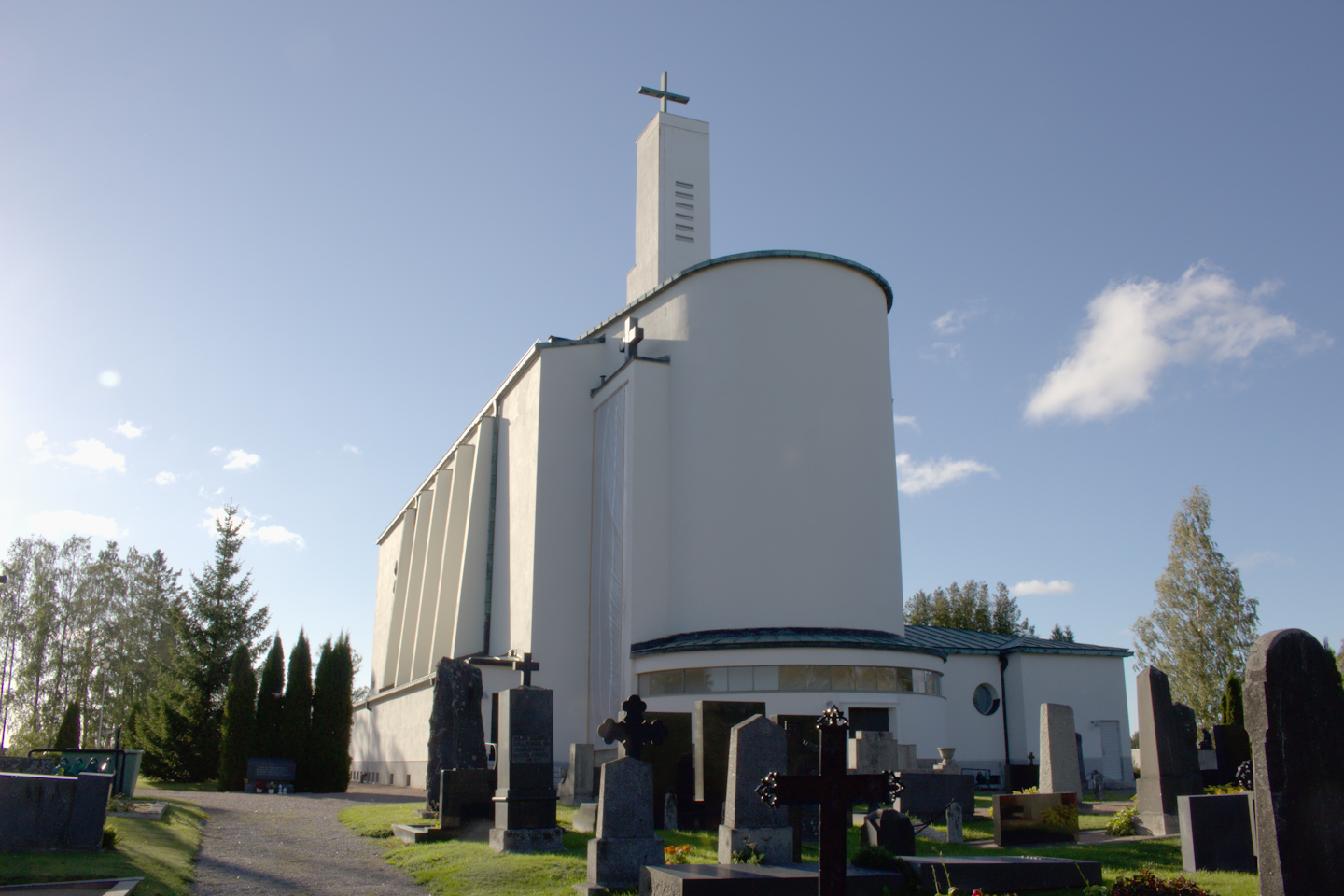
- Nakkila Church
- 61°22′04″N 22°00′14″E
- Location: Kirkkokatu 4,, Nakkila
- Country: Finland
- Denomination: Evangelical Lutheran Church of Finland

Architecture
- Architect: Erkki Huttunen
- Groundbreaking: 24 June 1936
- Completed: 26 June 1937

Specifications
- Capacity: 1 000

Administration
- Diocese: Archdiocese of Turku
- Parish: Nakkila

Nakkila Church is a Functionalist-style Lutheran church in Nakkila, Finland. It was completed in 1937 by the design of the architect Erkki Huttunen. Along with the churches of Kannonkoski, Rajamäki and Varkaus and the Lakeuden Risti Church, it is considered as one of the most significant examples of Modernist churches in Finland.

Nakkila Church was built next to the 1764 completed wooden church which was later demolished. It was financed by the bequest of the local businessman J. W. Suominen (1877–1935). He was buried in a crypt beneath the church. Next to the Nakkila Church is the 1970 completed parish center by the architect Juha Leiviskä. The modernist interior includes a wooden crucifix instead of an altarpiece. The lightning is designed by Paavo Tynell.

In 1993, Nakkila Church was listed as a modernist site of international importance by the Docomomo International. The church and the cemetery are also listed as Cultural Environments of National Significance by the Finnish National Board of Antiquities.
