= Woikoski =

Oy Woikoski Ab is Finland's oldest industrial and medical gas supplier. The company started 1882 as a carbon black factory which then evolved into the company's current form. The company is also an importer of welding and gas equipment which they distribute along with their gas products through a network of resellers. It currently operates 13 plants and offices, and has over 200 agents in Finland. In 2012 The annual turnover was approx. 41 million EUR.

Woikoski is also an exporter of liquid and gaseous helium, with an automated helium plant capable of recycling gaseous helium. In 2006 the company finished a carbon dioxide treatment plant capable of recovering and recycling 1-3 tonnes of carbon dioxide per hour.

== History ==
Woikoski was originally a factory producing carbon black, a pigment formerly known as lampblack, but over the decades its production focus shifted to gas production. Gas production began with the production of hydrogen, with oxygen produced as a by-product and sold for welding purposes. The company also manufactures equipment and systems needed for the handling and distribution of gases.

Alfred A. Palmberg, the son of engineer Knut August Palmberg, bought a mill on the banks of the Voikoski rapids in 1909 and established a millstone factory. He sold the Voikoski area to his brother Bertil Palmberg, who established a chemical factory and power plant there, both of which began operations in 1920. The Voikoski gas works continued operations under Oy Woikoski Ab, founded in 1929, which produces technical and medicinal gases and also builds and designs equipment and distribution systems for the field. Bertil Palmberg was succeeded as the company’s managing director from 1948 to 1977 by his son Sven Palmberg, who received the honorary title of Industrial Counsellor, and then by Sven’s son Clas Palmberg.
