= Youpret =

Finnish interpreting and translation company

- Industry: interpreting- and translation services
- Founded: 2016
- Headquarters: Joensuu, Finland
- Website: youpret.com

Youpret is a Finnish language service that offers interpreting and translation services. The name "Youpret" comes from the words "your interpreter". The company was founded in 2016 in Joensuu, Finland. Youpret intermediates interpreting assignments to approximately 1,300 interpreters, translators and other language professionals. Its customers include both public- and private sector organizations.

== Growth and development ==
Youpret was founded in 2016 by Ali Giray, Heikki Vepsäläinen, Teemu Purmonen, and Pekka Nurmela to address the growing need for remote interpreting services in Finland. In recent years, the company has grown into one of the biggest interpreting service providers in the country.

In November 2024, Youpret's mobile application received the KotoTeko award, granted by the Finnish Refugee Council in recognition of an innovation that promotes integration. Additionally, in the same month, Youpret was listed in Deloitte's Technology Fast 50 (ranked 19th) among the fastest-growing technology companies.

In December 2024, Youpret became the first Nordic language service company to receive a B Corp sustainability certification. B Corp certification is an international sustainability certification awarded by the non-profit organization B Lab. The certification is intended for companies that meet B Lab’s criteria for social and environmental responsibility, transparency, and responsible governance. B Corp–certified companies are assessed across several areas, including corporate governance, employee practices, impacts on customers, relationships with stakeholders, and environmental impact. The certification is based on the B Impact Assessment, which measures and scores a company’s overall impact according to predefined criteria.

In September 2025, Youpret began operations in Iceland, where the company offers remote- and on-site interpreting alongside the new service of instant interpreting. In January 2026, Youpret expanded its operations to Estonia by starting a collaboration with the Estonian translation company Interlex OÜ.

In 2026, Youpret added an AI-based interpreting service to its service portfolio, which uses artificial intelligence to translate speech between languages.
