= Bittium (company) =

Finnish company

Bittium Corporation
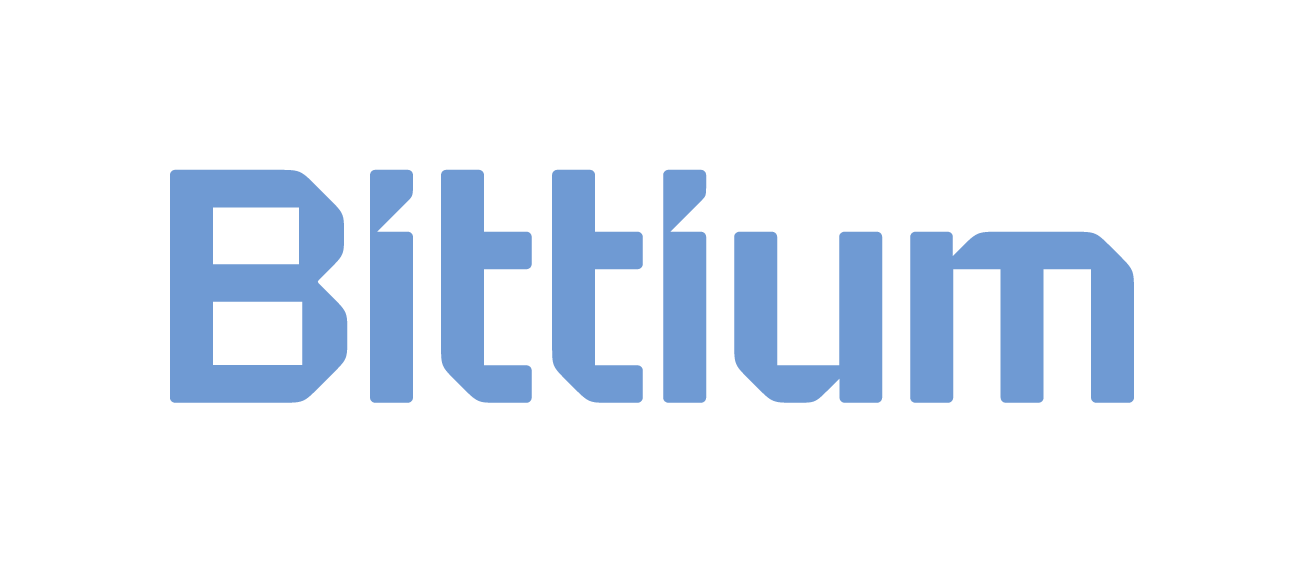

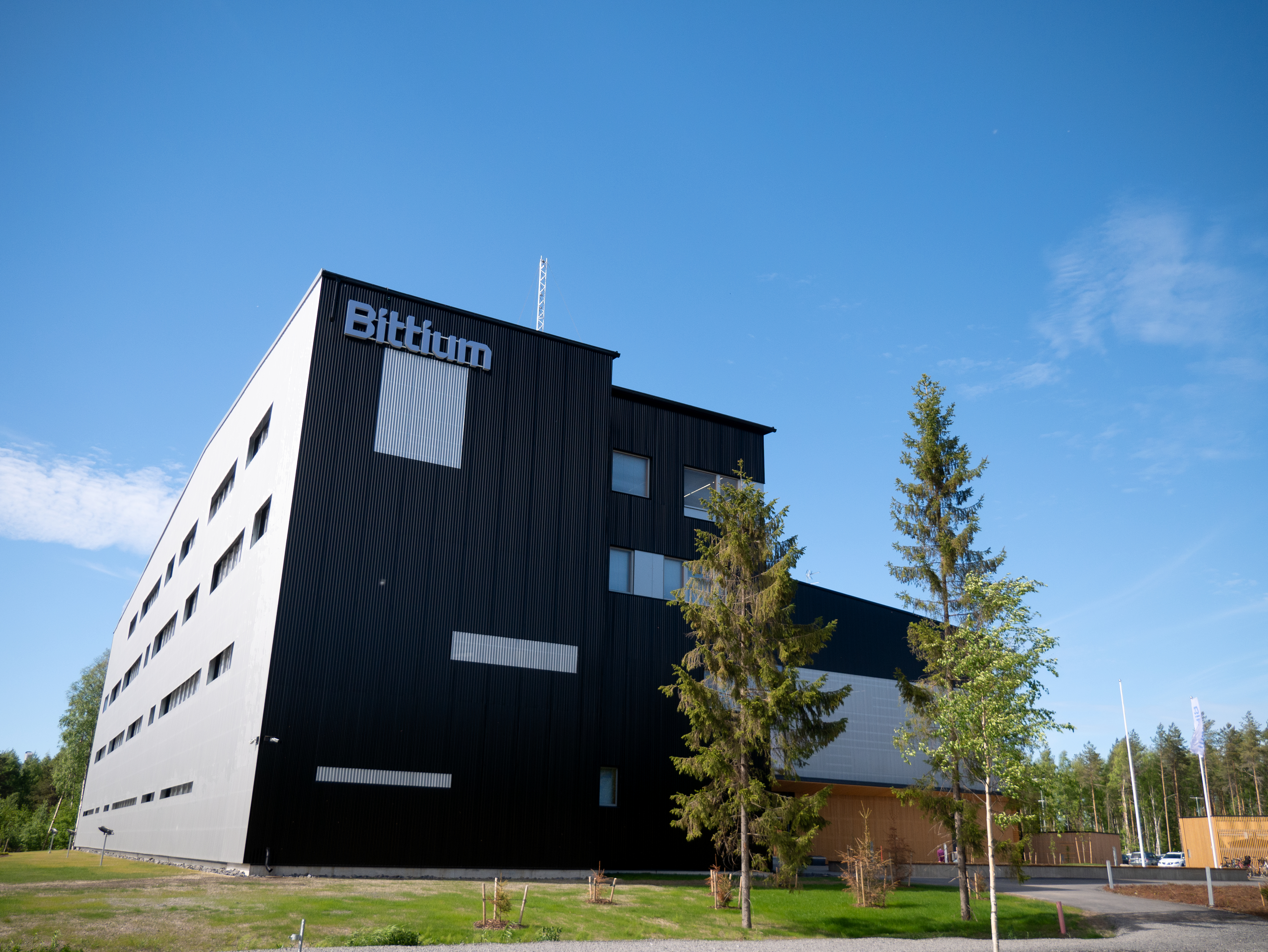
- Bittium's Oulu office in 2018
- Type: Public
- Traded as: Nasdaq Helsinki: BITTI
- Industry: Information Technology
- Founded: 1985
- Headquarters: Oulu, Finland
- Key people: Petri Toljamo (CEO); Petri Hiljanen (CFO)
- Revenue: €119.3 million (2025)
- Number of employees: 528 (2025)
- Website: www.bittium.com

Bittium Corporation is a Finnish company headquartered in Oulu. An engineering company in wireless businesses, Bittium specializes in the development of secure communications and connectivity solutions for sectors including defense, public safety, government, critical infrastructure, and the medical industry.

== History ==
In August 2012, the court approved a conditional settlement agreement between EB and TerreStar Corporation and some of its preferred shareholders in the reorganization proceedings of TerreStar Corporation, based on which EB received 13.5 million US dollars in cash on August 28, 2012, as final compensation for its claims. The settlement does not apply to TerreStar Networks' ongoing Chapter 11 liquidation proceedings and does not include any distributions that may be received from those proceedings.

On 28 January 2013 Anite plc of the U.K. announced it would acquire the Elektrobit System Test Ltd. subsidiary from Elektrobit Corporation (EB), representing the Propsim portion of EB's business. The acquisition was effective 1 February 2013.

On May 19, 2015, Elektrobit announced the sale of its automotive business segment to Continental AG for US$680 million. The sale includes the Elektrobit brand and all automotive segment assets. Elektrobit's wireless business was renamed Bittium Corporation. The acquisition was effective 1 July 2015.

On November 10, 2016, Bittium announced the acquisition of Mega Electronics Ltd and MegaKoto Ltd, Finnish companies based in Kuopio. Mega Electronics Ltd, founded in 1983, is an ISO13485 certified medical device manufacturing company. The company is specialised in biosignal measuring for cardiology, neurology, rehabilitation, occupational health and sports medicine. MegaKoto Ltd provides arrhythmia monitoring services for its customers such as primary care centers, private clinics and hospitals.

In November 2024, Bittium Wireless Ltd and the Finnish Defence Forces signed a long-term partnership agreement covering the years 2025-2036. In November 2025, Bittium Wireless signed a framework agreement with both the Finnish and Swedish Defence Forces, expanding its collaboration to a joint procurement scheme between the two countries in the area of command-and-control systems. The agreement allows both countries to procure Bittium's tactical communications equipment and software-defined radios, and it also facilitates future joint product development. Additionally, the agreement enables other Nordic defence partners, such as Norway and Denmark, to join the framework in the future.

== Bittium products and services ==
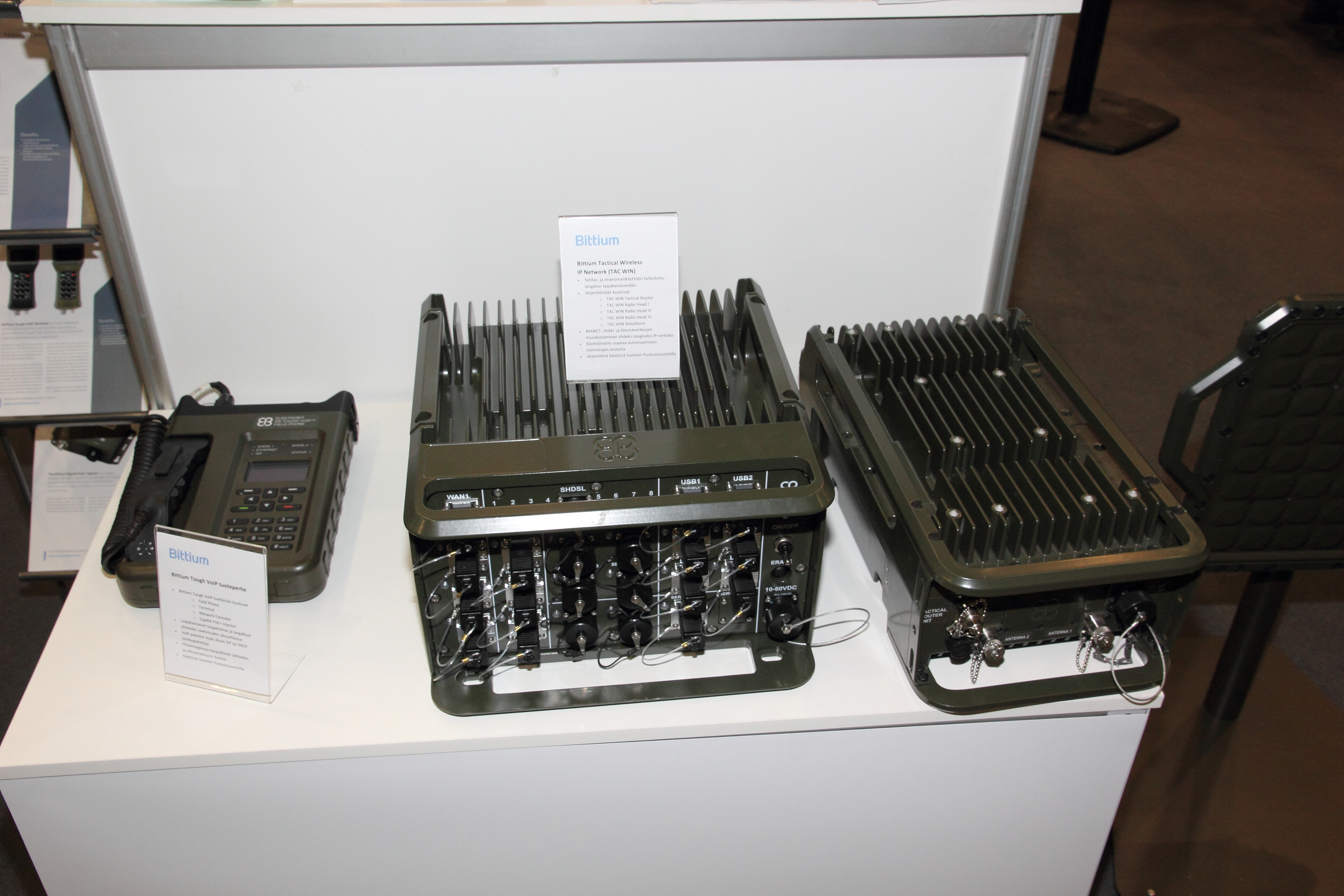
Bittium Tactical Wireless IP network

Bittium's products:

- Bittium Tactical Wireless IP Network
- Bittium Tough VoIP
- Bittium Specialised Device Platform
- Bittium Tough Mobile
- Bittium SafeMove

== See also ==
- List of Finnish companies
