= Navielektro =

Finnish company

- Trade name: Navielektro Ky
- Type: Private
- Industry: Software, Electronics, Military
- Founded: 1987
- Founder: Asser Koivisto
- Headquarters: Kaarina, Finland
- Area served: Global
- Key people: Asser Koivisto (CEO), Mats Koivisto (CTO)
- Products: JMAP Tactical Display Framework MATIS i-VMS Networked Track Fusion and Management System Route Management NERCS GMDSS DSC i-AtoN Sensors NEWIS
- Number of employees: 34
- Website: www.navielektro.fi

Navielektro /nɑvielektro/ is a privately owned Finnish company specialized in development and maintenance of situational awareness, surveillance and communication systems for both civilian and military purposes. Navielektro develops, manufactures and provides maintenance for a range of various radar and related sensors and communication equipment.

== History ==
Navielektro was founded by Asser Koivisto in 1987. The company originally began as a three person endeavor, selling and installing navigation systems onboard vessels. The operations eventually expanded to include installations of ship bridges. In the mid 1990s, the company branched out to surveillance sensors and software, as the focus shifted from providing on-board navigational systems to developing sensors, maritime surveillance systems and vessel traffic management systems for control centers. The first radar manufactured by Navielektro was developed in 1994, and the company has continued to produce their own line of antennas and sensors ever since.

In 1996, Navielektro signed a contract with the Finnish Maritime Administration (now the Finnish Transport Agency) to help establish a VTS system for the Archipelago Sea. From this point onwards, the company began to focus mainly on development, maintenance and delivery of situational awareness systems. By the early 2000s, the entire coast of Finland was covered by VTS delivered by Navielektro.

Navielektro co-operated with the main Swedish actors in the field of AIS system technology, resulting in the development of the first system in the world fusing AIS and radar tracks. Collaboration with the Finnish Maritime Administration, the Southwestern Maritime District and the Finnish Defense Forces made it possible to realize this innovation in Finland, making the Finnish VTS system the first in the world to incorporate AIS, providing interaction between the VTS system and vessels. Navielektro’s operations further expanded to include general situational awareness services and related software in the year 2000.

In May 2004, the Swedish Saab TransponderTech announced the company would be partnering with Navielektro to promote products for the VTS and coastal surveillance systems market. Navielektro and Saab TransponderTech teamed up to offer VTMS and Coastal Surveillance Systems for maritime administrations and port authorities worldwide for several years.

Since the year 2000 and onwards, Navielektro has provideded the Finnish Border Guard and the Finnish Navy with command, control, communications and surveillance platforms.

== Deliveries ==
Navielektro is the leading supplier of VTS, Coastal Surveillance and Situational Awareness Systems for the Coast of Finland. The majority of the radars currently in operation along the Finnish coast have been provided by Navielektro, replacing FIKA-radars from the 1970s. All of the Finnish agencies engaging in coastal surveillance (such as the Finnish Transport Agency, the Finnish Border Guard and the Finnish Navy) utilize radars and situational awareness systems manufactured by Navielektro. The VTMS and Coastal Surveillance System that Navielektro designed and delivered for the Finnish trilateral METO agencies is one of the largest and most sophisticated of its kind in the world.

In 2011, Navielektro and Eltel signed a contract with Ghana Maritime Authority to supply and install a Vessel Traffic Management Information System to ensure electronic surveillance and monitoring of the coast of Ghana. Navielektro provided the technology, while Eltel implemented telecommunication and homeland security solutions. The system was inaugurated on April 29, 2014, and integrates several sub-systems like radar control, automatic identification, radio data, CCTV and area control centers.

Navielektro actively participates in the development of situational awareness systems as part of joint operations with ITU, IALA and NATO.

== Projects ==
Navielektro has actively participated in the following projects:

- HELCOM (Helsinki Commission, First International AIS data-sharing tests in the late 1990s)
- GOFREP (Gulf of Finland Tri National Reporting System)
- METO (Finnish Maritime Tri Lateral Co-Operation)
- SUCFIS (Sweden-Finland, Military Sea Surveillance Co-Operation)
- SUCBAS (Baltic Sea Surveillance Co-Operation)
- MARSUR (Maritime Surveillance)
- ENSI (Enhanced Navigation Support Information) Service

== Products and Services ==
Navielektro offers a wide range of different solutions for surveillance and communication for both civilian and military customers. The company provides naval and military tactical information systems as well as systems for maritime surveillance (integrating VTS and AIS information in the RMP), intelligent transport, voice communication and weather information. Navielektro also manufactures radar sensors and transceivers.
