= Nakkila =

- Municipality
- Nakkilan kunta Nakkila kommun
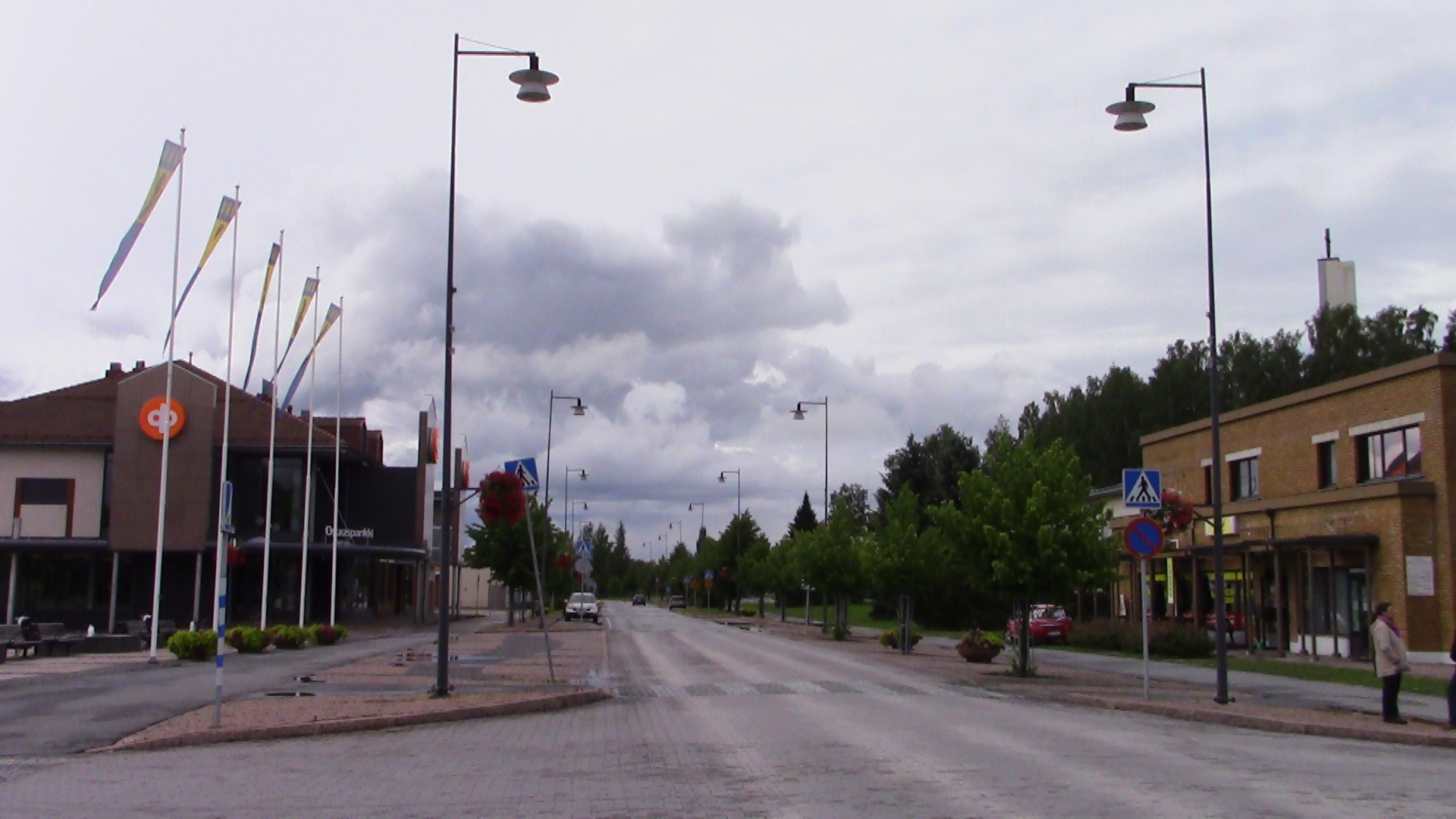
- Porintie, one of the main streets at Nakkila's centre in July 2020.

- Coat of arms
- Motto: Ystävyys meitä yhdistää
- Location of Nakkila in Finland
- Interactive map of Nakkila
- Coordinates: 61°21′53″N 22°00′20″E
- Country: Finland
- Region: Satakunta
- Sub-region: Pori
- Charter: 1861

Government
  - Municipal manager: Nina-Mari Turpela

Area (2018-01-01)
  - Total: 184.88 km^{2} (71.38 sq mi)
  - Land: 182.93 km^{2} (70.63 sq mi)
  - Water: 1.97 km^{2} (0.76 sq mi)
  - Rank: 268th largest in Finland

Population (2025-12-31)
  - Total: 4,890
  - Rank: 167th largest in Finland
  - Density: 26.73/km^{2} (69.2/sq mi)

Population by native language
  - Finnish: 97.1% (official)
  - Swedish: 0.6%
  - Others: 2.4%

Population by age
  - 0 to 14: 14.8%
  - 15 to 64: 56.5%
  - 65 or older: 28.7%
- Time zone: UTC+02:00 (EET)
  - Summer (DST): UTC+03:00 (EEST)
- Climate: Dfc
- Website: nakkila.fi/en/

Nakkila (Finnish pronunciation: [ˈnɑkːilɑ]) is a municipality of Finland. It is located in the province of Western Finland and is part of the Satakunta region, 19 kilometres (12 mi) southeast of Pori. The Kokemäki River flows along the center of Nakkila. The municipality has a population of 4,890 (31 December 2025) and covers an area of 184.88 square kilometres (71.38 sq mi) of which 1.97 km^{2} (0.76 sq mi) is water. The population density is 26.73 inhabitants per square kilometre (69.2/sq mi). The municipality is unilingually Finnish. The name Nackeby was earlier used in Swedish.

There are two major sights, the Nakkila Church and the film studio Villilä, often referred as "Hollywood of Finland". Nakkila is also well known for the European river lampreys, which are a traditional food of the locality.

== History ==
In the early days of the Continuation War, Järvikylä, Nakkila was a target of a strange bombing, when the Soviet bombers carried out the only air bombing of the Satakunta region. The reason of the bombing is still unknown.

== Demographics ==
Historical census populations – Nakkila

Year	Pop.	±%
1980	6 248	—
1985	6,445	—
1990	6,396	−0.8%
1995	6,186	−3.3%
2000	6,094	−1.5%

Year	Pop.	±%
2005	5,832	−4.3%
2010	5,788	−0.8%
2015	5,651	−2.4%
2020	5,321	−5.8%

== Economy ==
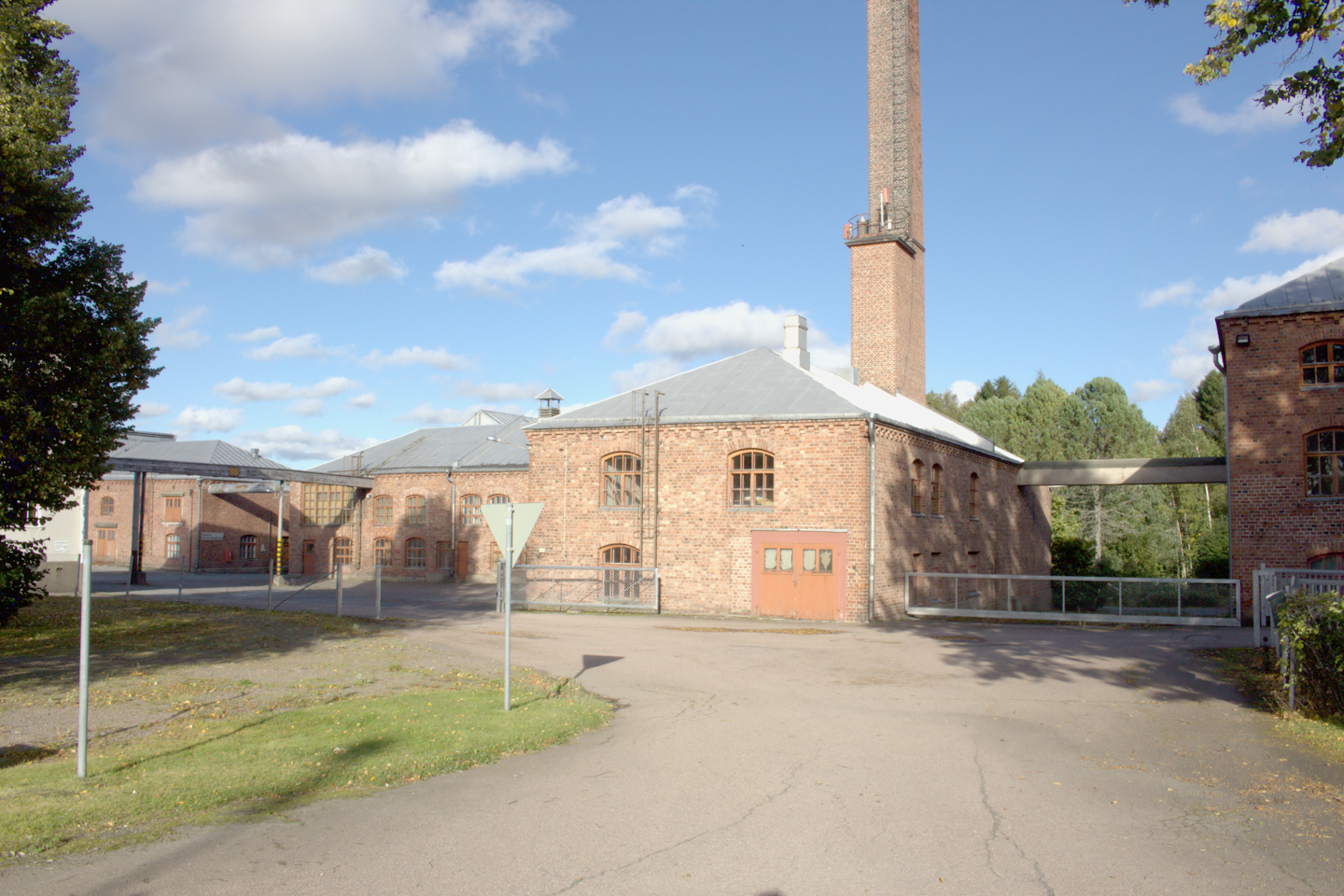
J. W. Suominen's old nonwovens factory in Nakkila

Nakkila's most significant industrial companies are Nakkila Works konepaja and Länsi-Suomen Voima Oy's hydropower plant. Smaller industrial activities have been represented by the carpentry industry. The Suominen Corporation's nonwovens factory (formerly Suomisen nahkatehdas) has also been a major employer, but much of the production has been shut down by the end of 2012.

== Villages in Nakkila ==
The year following the name of the village indicates when the first document entry is known about the village.

Arantila, Anola (1410), Hormisto, Järvikylä, Kivialho, Kukonharja (1354), Lammainen (1348), Leistilä (1441), Masia, Matomäki, Pakkala, Punapakka, Penttala, Pysykykangas, Ruskila, Soinila, Tattara (1441), Tervasmäki, Uotinmäki, Viikkala, Villilä(1451), Vuohimäki, Hohtari.

== Transport ==
Nakkila's most significant road is valtatie 2 between Helsinki and Pori. The Tampere-Pori railway also passes through Nakkila. Nakkila is served by OnniBus.com route Helsinki—Pori.

== Politics ==
Results of the 2011 Finnish parliamentary election in Nakkila:

- Left Alliance 22.1%
- True Finns 19.1%
- Centre Party 18.5%
- Social Democratic Party 17.7%
- National Coalition Party 15.9%
- Green League 3.2%
- Christian Democrats 3.2%
- Other parties 0.3%

== Attractions ==
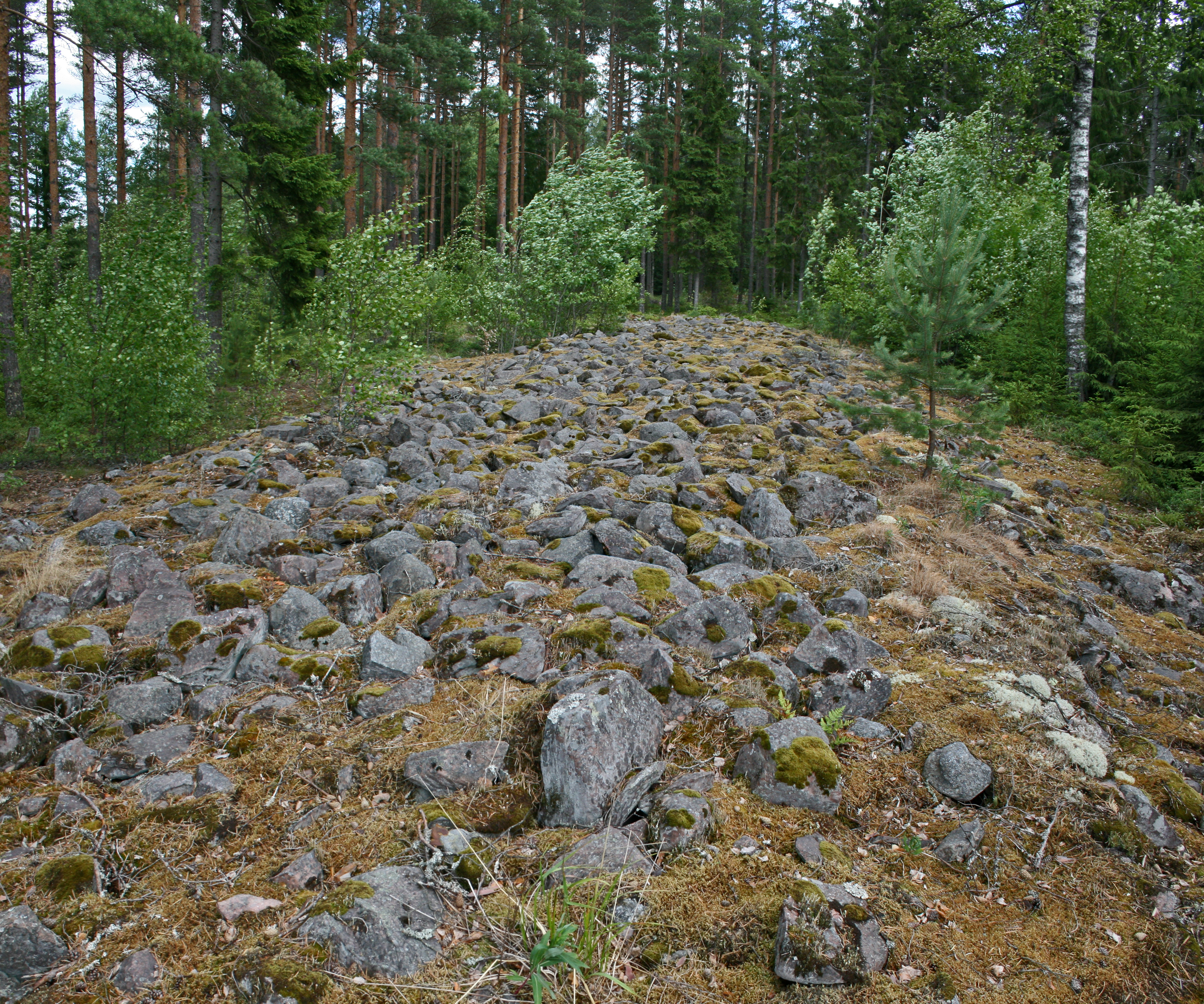
Selkäkangas cairn in Nakkila

Nakkila's attractions include Finland's first functionalist church, completed in 1937, and Villilä film studio, which is sometimes nicknamed "Hollywood of Finland". Villilä has shot parts of the films Sibelius (2003), Kaksipäisen kotkan varjossa (2005), FC Venus (2005) and Risto Räppääjä ja liukas Lennart (2014). There are also many archeological monuments in Nakkila, the most important of which are the Kiukainen cultural area in Uotinmäki, the Selkäkangas burial mounds in Viikkala from the bronze ages and the Rieskaronmäki bronze age residence in Kivialho.

Other attractions include:

- Kotiseutumuseo
- Juustomeijerimuseo
- Pyssykankaan koulumuseo.

== Sports ==
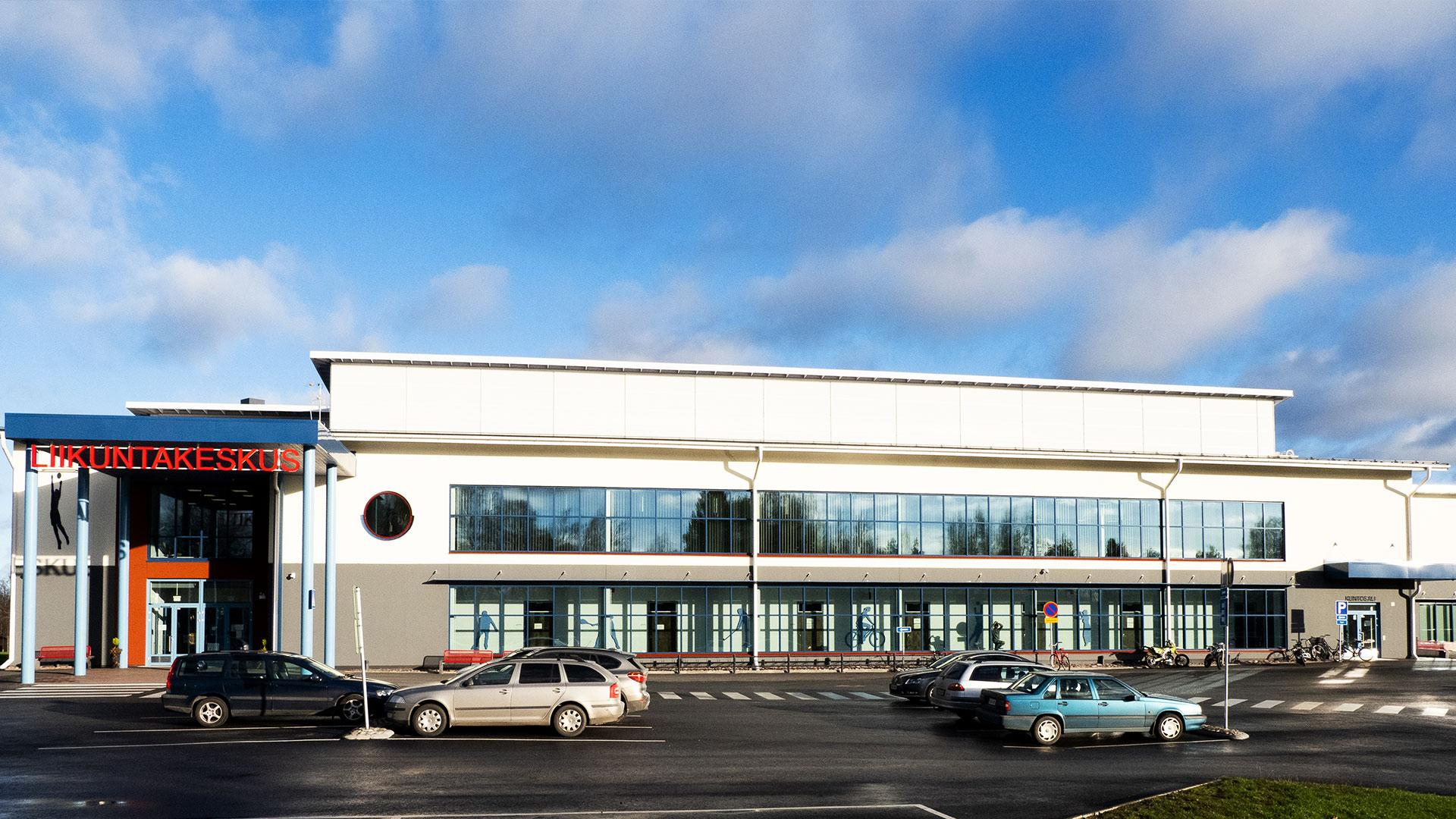
The main building of the Nakkila sporting center from the front

Nakkila has multiple clubs for different sports. Nasta is an association football and futsal club, NTK is a floorball club, Vire an athletics club and Paterit a volleyball club. Nasta used to play ice hockey and pesäpallo.

Nakkila used to have an indoor swimming pool, but in 2017 a new sporting center was built to replace it. The new sporting center has football fields, both artificial and grass, and a multipurpose indoor sporting hall and a gym. The outside of the sporting hall also has a running track, a frisbeegolf course and an ice hockey rink.

Salomonkallio is a ski resort and a golf course in Nakkila. The golf course has 18 holes and according to the golfing club, they have over 1 600 members.

The Finnish Championships of cross country running of 2022 were held in Nakkila from 7 May 2022 to 8 May 2022.

== Notable people ==
- Edvard Hannula (1859–1931), Finnish clergyman and politician
- Kyllikki Pohjala (1894–1979), Finnish politician
- Simo Frangén (1963) comedian
- Juho Wiktor Suominen (1877–1935) manufacturer
- Jesse Laaksonen (1989) ice hockey player
- Niklas Nevalainen (1993) ice hockey player
- Eemeli Reponen (1990) footballer
- Joonas Lakkamäki (2002) footballer
- Axel Kurck (1555–1630) warlord
- Tauno Matomäki (1937) Vuorineuvos
- Markus Palttala (1977) racing driver

== Sister cities ==
Nakkila is twinned with:

- Boksitogorsk, Leningrad Oblast, Russia
- Hudiksvall, Sweden
