= Process Vision =

Finnish IT company

- Industry: Information Technology
- Founded: 1993; 32 years ago
- Founder: Simo Makkonen
- Headquarters: Helsinki, Finland
- Key people: Simo Makkonen, CEO
- Number of employees: 100+
- Website: www.processvision.fi

Process Vision is a Finnish privately owned IT company.

The company specialises in applications for controlling electricity generation and distribution for large-scale energy companies. Process Vision's customers include various city- and nation-scale energy companies in the Nordic countries, the Baltic countries and Germany. Process Vision has over 100 employees, and has four offices: the main office in Helsinki, and branch offices in Jyväskylä, Kuopio, and Uppsala, Sweden.

The company was founded in 1993 by CEO Simo Makkonen.
