= Suominen Corporation =

Finnish textile company

- Native name: Suominen Oyj
- Company type: Public company (Julkinen osakeyhtiö)
- Traded as: Nasdaq Helsinki: SUY1V
- Founded: 1898; 128 years ago
- Founder: Juho Wiktor Suominen
- Headquarters: Helsinki, Finland
- Area served: Europe, Americas
- Key people: Petri Helsky (CEO), Jaakko Eskola (Chairman of the board)
- Products: Nonwovens
- Revenue: 443.2 million euros (2021)
- Operating income: 26.9 million euros (2021)
- Net income: 20.7 million euros (2021)
- Number of employees: 710 (average in 2021)
- Website: www.suominen.fi

Suominen Corporation (Nasdaq Helsinki: SUY1V; natively Suominen Oyj) is a Finnish company that supplies its industrial and retail customers with nonwovens for use in consumer products worldwide. Suominen is the global market leader in nonwovens for wipes. The company employs approximately 600 persons in Finland, Italy, Spain, Brazil and the United States. Suominen's net sales in 2015 amounted to 444 million euros and operating profit excluding non-recurring items was 31.2 million euros.
