= Kaasik =

Family name

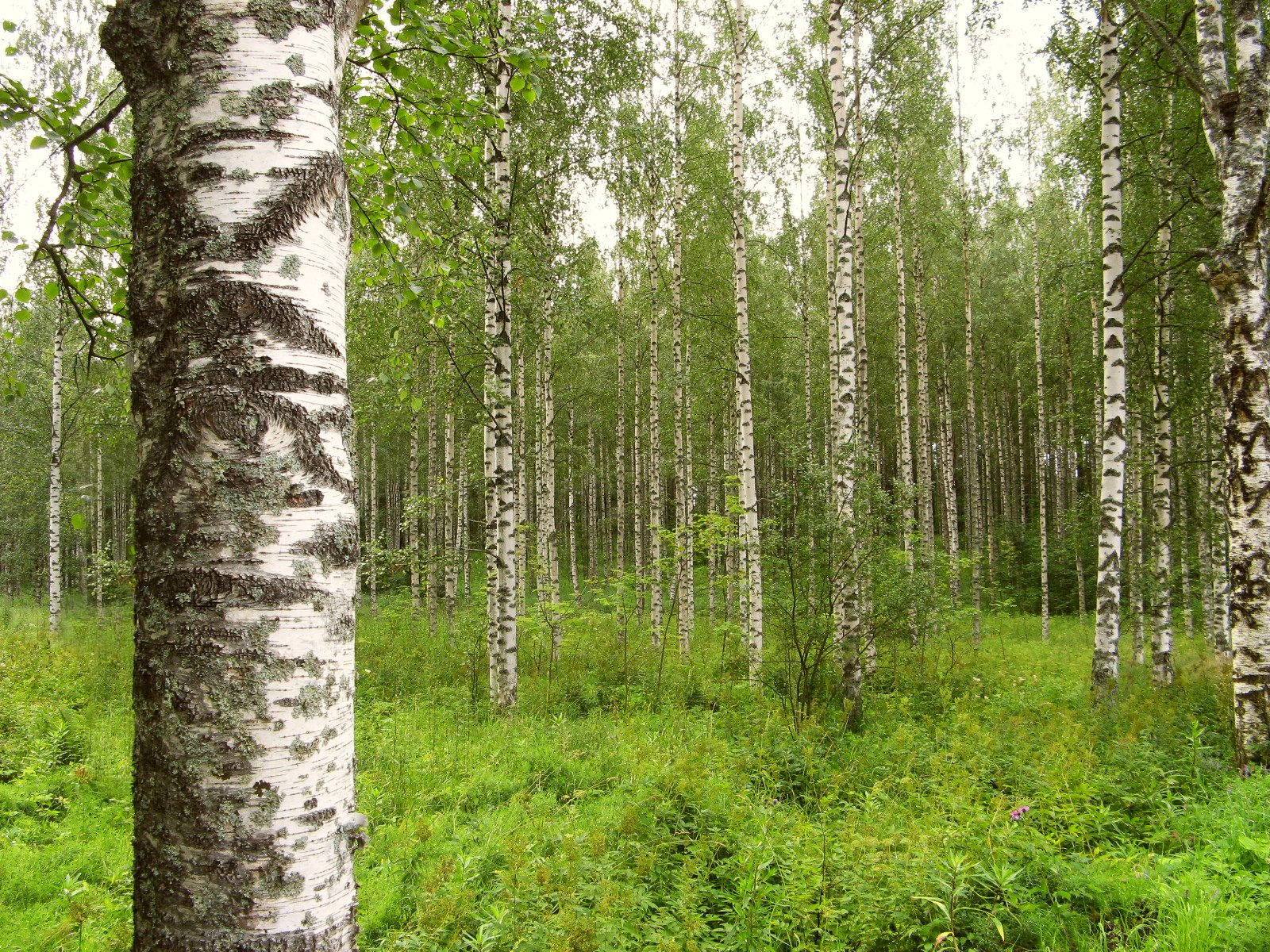

Origin
- Language: Estonian
- Meaning: Birch forest
- Region of origin: Estonia

Other names
- Variant forms: Kasemets, Kask, Kõiv

Kaasik is an Estonian surname (meaning birch forest). Notable people with the surname include:

- Ain-Elmar Kaasik (1934–2026), Estonian neurologist, neurosurgeon and academic
- Gert Kaasik, Estonian-born Finnish rapper and DJ
- Hannes Kaasik (born 1978), Estonian football referee
- Tõnis Kaasik (born 1949), Estonian entrepreneur, fencer, environmentalist, conservationist, and politician
- Ülo Kaasik (1926–2017), Estonian mathematician

== See also ==
- Kaasiku (disambiguation), several villages in Estonia
- Kasemets, Estonian surname also meaning birch forest
