= Kasemets =

Family name

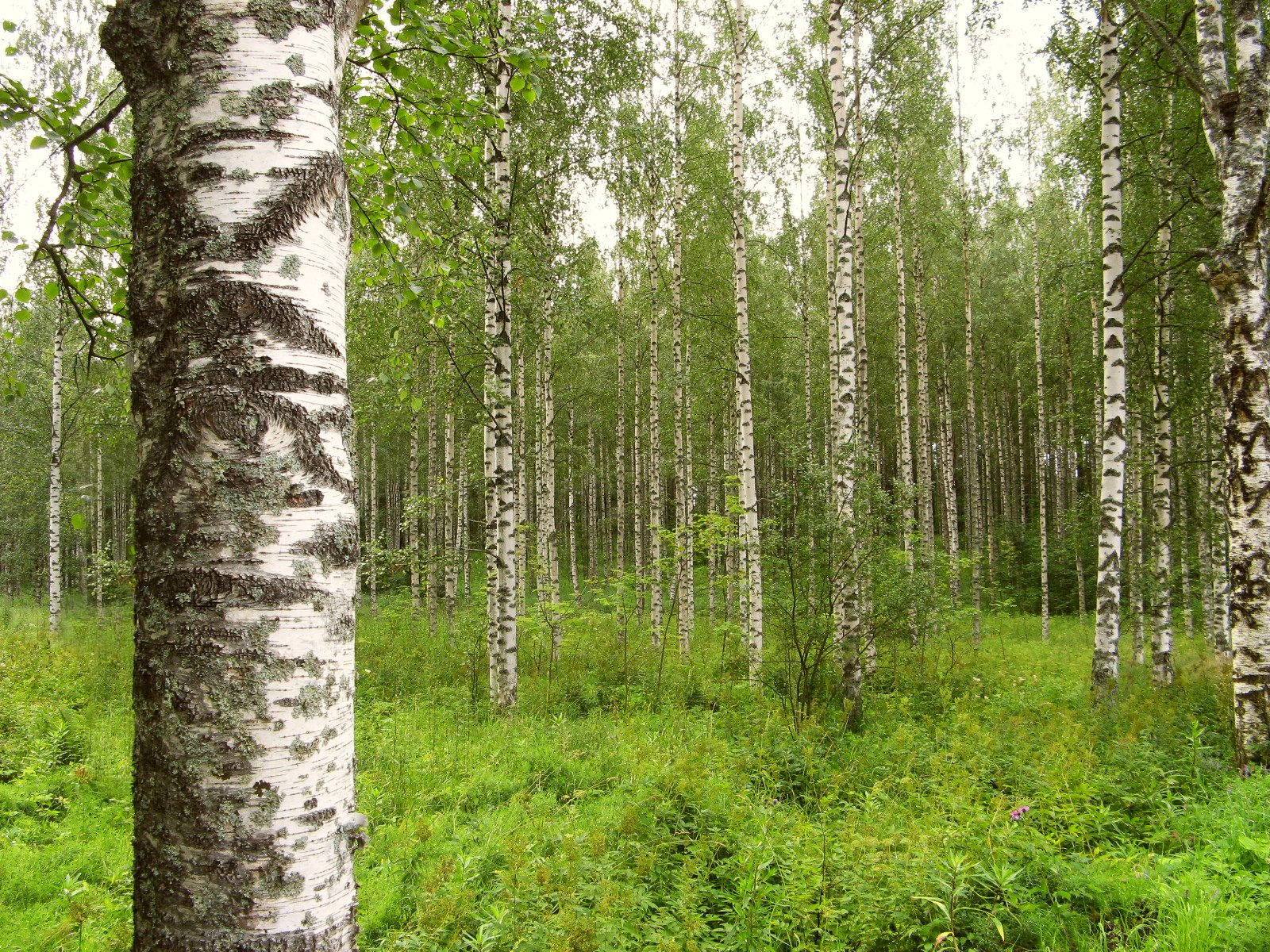

Origin
- Language: Estonian
- Meaning: Birch forest
- Region of origin: Estonia

Other names
- Variant forms: Kaasik, Kask, Kõiv

Kasemets is an Estonian surname (meaning birch forest).

Notable people with the surname include:

- Aare Kasemets (born 1963), Estonian sociologist
- Tõnis Kasemets (born 1974), Estonian racing driver
- Udo Kasemets (1919–2014), Estonian-born Canadian composer

== See also ==
- Kasemetsa, village in Estonia
- Kaasik, Estonian surname also meaning birch forest
