= Tax burden =

Proportion of income paid in taxes at different income levels

Chart comparing effective total (federal and state and local) tax rates in the United States, of the richest Americans and those in the bottom 50% of earners

The tax burden is the level of effective taxation represented as the distribution of tax rates across people, households, sectors, or forms of income by the amount of their income. Tax burdens are commonly summarized as the tax revenue as a share of gross domestic product for different groups; usually as the effective tax rates paid by different income groups as a share of their income or consumption, or taxes on labor measured as a tax wedge.

The tax burden is related to but distinct from tax incidence. Incidence analysis examines how a tax may be shifted through prices and factor returns, while tax burden typically refers to the taxes paid by different income groups. The distribution of the tax burden is an important topic in public finance and is frequently discussed in relation to economic inequality, wealth redistribution, and fiscal policy.

== Definitions and measurement ==
Because tax systems include many taxes and exemptions, and because studies may define "income" differently and make different incidence assumptions, tax-burden estimates are not always directly comparable across sources.

Common measures include:

- Tax-to-GDP ratio: total tax revenue divided by GDP; used for comparisons across countries and over time.
- Effective tax rates by group: taxes attributed to a group divided by a measure of that group's resources (for example, annual income); used to describe how progressive or regressive a system is.
- Labor tax burden (tax wedge): the difference between total labor costs to an employer and a worker's net take-home pay, expressed as a share of labor costs (often including income taxes and social contributions, net of cash benefits).

A tax's legal liability (the statutory responsibility to remit payment) can differ from the economic effects after market adjustments. In standard public-finance models, tax shifting depends largely on the relative price elasticity of demand and price elasticity of supply, which determine how prices, wages, and returns adjust when a tax is introduced or changed. As a result, taxes may be partly reflected in consumer prices, wages, or returns to owners of capital, depending on market conditions. Taxes can also create deadweight loss by changing behavior and reducing mutually beneficial trades.

Public finance theory evaluates the equity of tax burdens using principles such as the benefit principle and the ability-to-pay principle. The ability-to-pay principle motivates progressive rate structures, while empirical work on behavioral responses (including tax avoidance and evasion) is used to assess efficiency and distributional outcomes under different tax designs.

== Tax mix and distribution within countries ==
Within a country, distributional analyses often separate burdens from major tax types, such as Income tax, Corporate tax, Property tax, general consumption taxes (including Sales tax and Value-added tax), and selective consumption taxes such as Excise taxes. Systems that rely heavily on broad consumption taxes tend to be more regressive relative to annual income unless offset by progressive income taxes or targeted credits; systems with larger roles for progressive income taxes and wealth-related taxation tend to place a larger share of the burden on high-income households (depending on the base, exemptions, and enforcement).

=== International comparisons ===
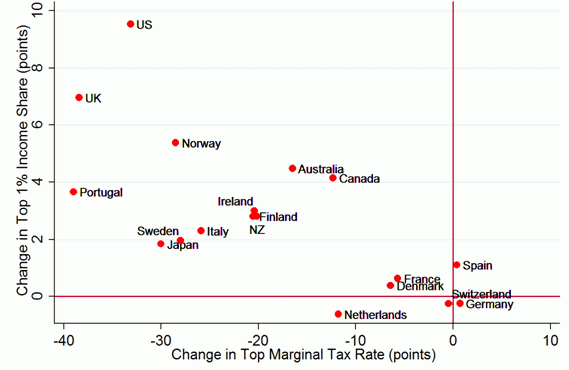
Change in top 1% pre-tax income shares against the change in their top marginal income tax rates from 1975 to 2008 for 18 OECD countries

Across countries, tax-to-GDP ratios vary widely. In 2023, OECD tax-to-GDP ratios ranged from 17.7% in Mexico to 43.8% in France, with an OECD average of 33.9%. The United States is relatively low-tax among high-income OECD countries by this measure; in 2022, total tax revenue was 27.7% of GDP versus an OECD average of about 34%, and the United States ranked 31st out of 38 OECD countries in that year in the cited comparison.

Comparisons also reflect differences in tax mix. For example, the United States is the only OECD country without a national value-added tax and relies primarily on state and local retail sales taxes; value-added taxes are used widely in other OECD countries and in many countries worldwide. A complementary cross-country measure is the tax wedge on labor. OECD reporting for 2023 shows an average tax wedge of 34.8% for a single worker earning the average wage and 25.7% for a one-earner married couple with two children (OECD averages as defined in the report).

For developing countries, a common cross-country pattern is lower tax revenue as a share of GDP than in richer countries. The literature discusses factors including widespread informal employment, administrative capacity constraints, economic structure, and political economy dynamics that can limit broad-based personal income taxation and increase reliance on indirect taxes on goods and services.

=== Distribution in the United States ===
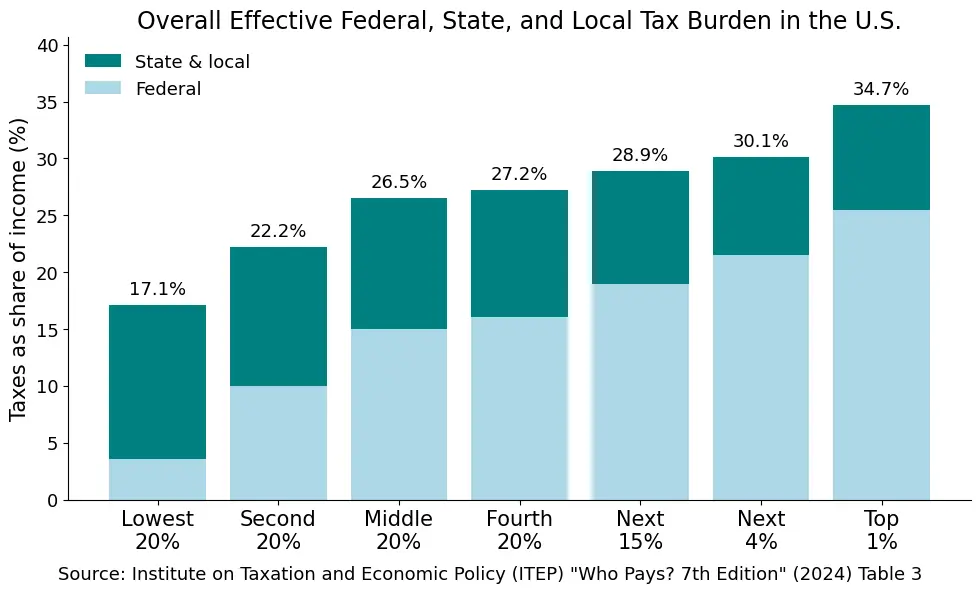
Overall tax burden in the US in 2024

Analyses commonly distinguish between a generally progressive federal system and more regressive state and local systems, reflecting differences in tax bases and the relative importance of consumption taxes at the subnational level.

The federal system relies on progressive personal income taxation and refundable tax credits, and research has examined changes in federal progressivity over time, including the role of credits for lower-income taxpayers. State and local tax systems often rely more heavily on consumption taxes such as general sales tax and excise taxes; distributional analyses therefore commonly report higher effective state and local tax rates (as a share of income) for lower-income households than for higher-income households, on average nationwide. Estimates for very high-wealth households are discussed below.

==== State and local taxes ====
Overall effective state and local tax rates in the United States (2024)
| Income group | Effective tax rate |
|---|---|
| Lowest 20% | 11.4% |
| Second 20% | 10.4% |
| Middle 20% | 10.5% |
| Fourth 20% | 10.3% |
| Next 15% | 9.5% |
| Next 4% | 8.3% |
| Top 1% | 7.2% |

In a nationwide analysis, the Institute on Taxation and Economic Policy (ITEP) reports the average effective state and local tax rates for non-senior households by income group, shown here. Differences across states reflect variation in the share of revenue raised from progressive income taxes, consumption taxes, and other sources.

== Very high-wealth effective tax rates ==
Some research estimates effective tax rates for the highest-wealth households using linked administrative and wealth data. A U.S. National Bureau of Economic Research working paper from August 2025 estimates income and taxes for the Forbes 400 group; it reports low effective tax rates for that group under its definitions and methodology.

The Congressional Budget Office (CBO) publishes a series of reports indicating the share of all federal taxes paid by taxpayers at a given income level. Their data for 2017 shows the following:

- The top 1% of income earners pay 25% of all federal taxes.
- The highest quintile pays 87% of all individual income taxes and 69% of all federal taxes.

== Relationship with economic inequality ==
The distribution of tax burdens is linked to economic inequality, including income inequality and wealth inequality. OECD work emphasizes that tax systems can affect inequality directly through the progressivity of personal taxes and wealth-related taxes, and indirectly through the way taxes finance public services and transfers.

Peer-reviewed and institutional reviews on fiscal policy and inequality generally find that taxes and transfers reduce disposable-income inequality in many high-income countries, while emphasizing variation across countries and the importance of policy design. Research also examines how changes in the taxation of top incomes, capital income, and wealth relate to inequality trends, and how tax systems interact with government budgets and redistribution over time. Policy debates in this area include proposals such as wealth taxes and measures to address cross-border tax avoidance, including through tax havens.

== See also ==
- Gini coefficient – Measure of inequality of a statistical distribution
- Optimal tax – Design and implementation of tax policy maximizing social welfare
- Progressive tax – Higher tax on richer sources
- Regressive tax – Higher tax ratio on poorer sources
- Tax choice – Participatory tax allocation process
