= Koivu =

Koivu is a Finnish surname meaning "birch". Notable people with the surname include:

- Mikko Koivu (born 1983), Finnish professional ice hockey player, brother of Saku
- Rudolf Koivu (1890–1946), Finnish artist
- Saku Koivu (born 1974), retired Finnish professional ice hockey player, brother of Mikko

== See also ==
- Kõiv, an Estonian surname of the same etymology
- Kõivu, an Estonian settlement
- Koivu mine, a titanium project in Finland
