= Forest industry in Finland =

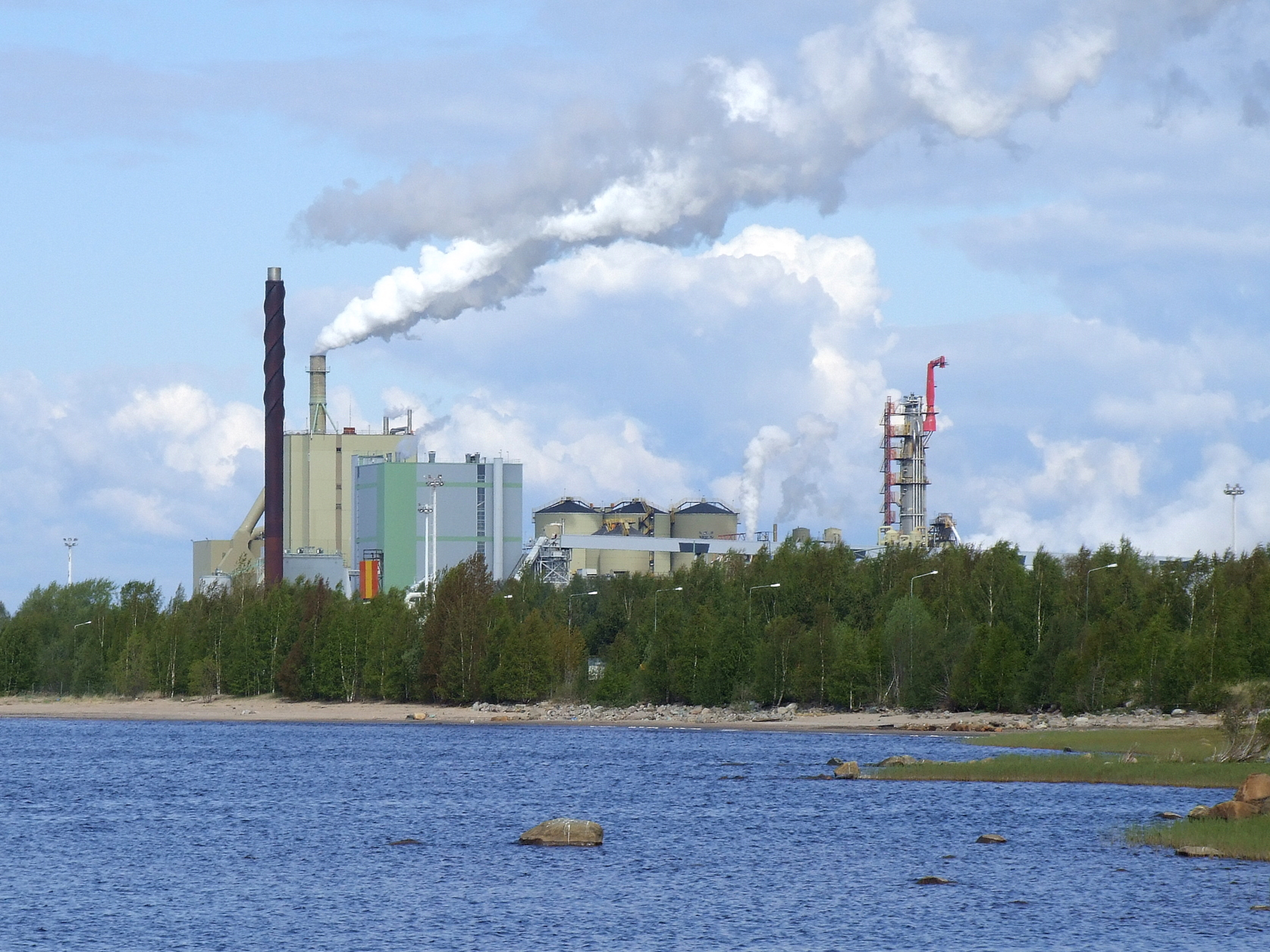
StoraEnso paper mill, Kemi, Veitsiluoto

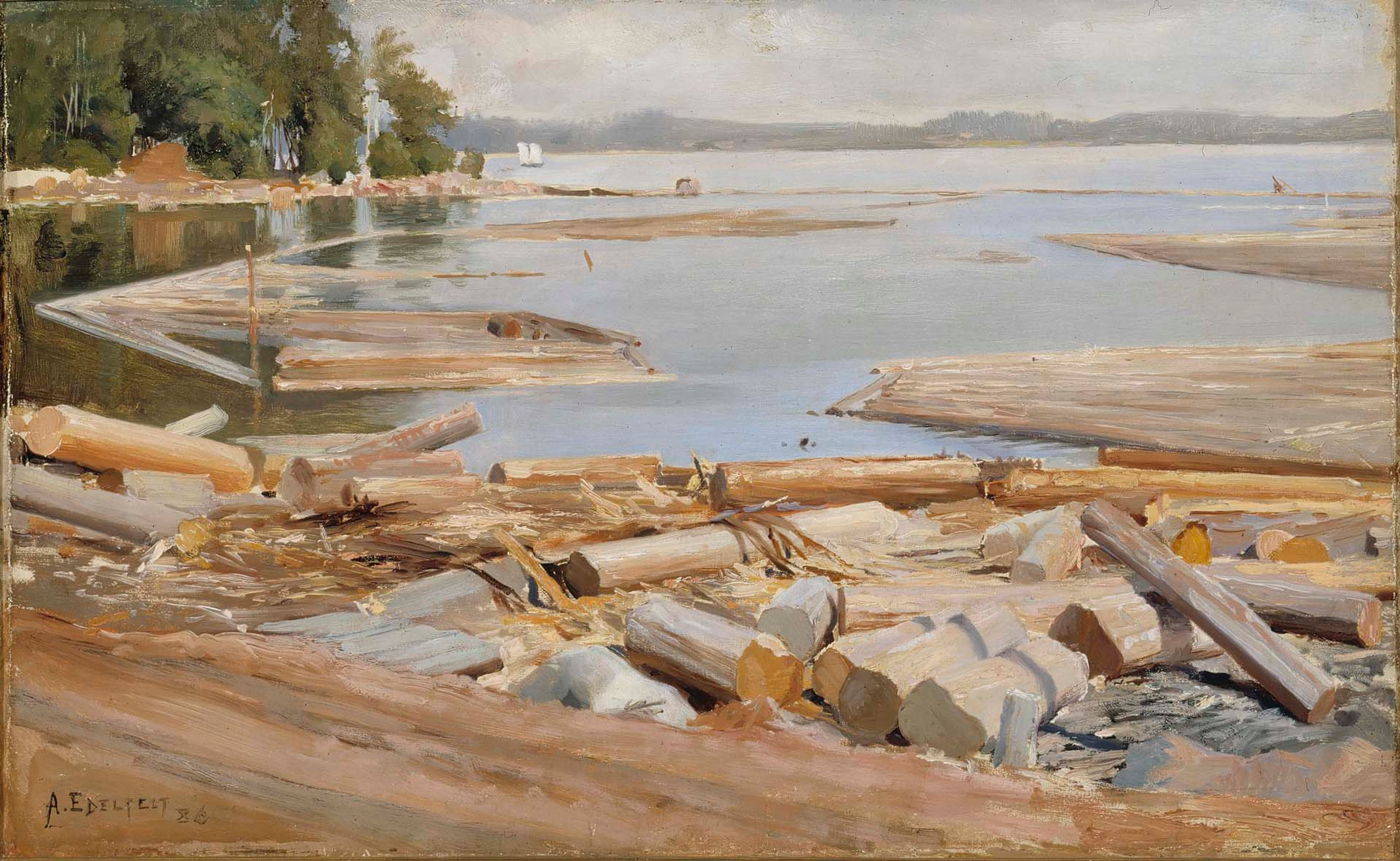
Tukkilautta (Log Raft), by Albert Edelfelt (1886). In the collection of the Finnish National Gallery.

Forest industry in Finland consists of mechanical (timber) and chemical (paper and pulp) forest industry. Finland is one of the world's largest producers of pulp, paper and cardboard and one of Europe's largest producers of sawn timber. The forest industry directly and indirectly employs approximately 160,000 people in Finland. The industry's multiplier effects extend broadly into surrounding society.

Log driving had begun by the 17th century in Finland (tukinuitto) with long rivers such as Oulujoki, Iijoki and Kemijoki being used. The total length of timber-floating routes in Finland was 40,000 km. Given the economic importance of the activity, the Finnish water act states that "unless otherwise provided by law, everyone has the right, without inflicting unnecessary damage, harm or disturbance, to… float timber in the water body…". A log driver competitions is still organised in Finland annually – the Tukkilaiskisat.

In 2014 the value of production of forest industry in Finland, including furniture industry, was 20.7 billion euros. This was 18% of all industrial production. Forest industry employed 15% of industrial workers in Finland. The forest industry is the main source of income for many regions in Finland. It accounts for approximately 20 per cent of all Finnish exports.

Chemical forest industry (also known as paper and pulp industry) produces paper, cardboard and pulp. Finland has 25 paper mills, 14 cardboard mills and 15 pulp mills. In 2014 they employed 22 000 people.

Mechanical forest industry produces wooden items mechanically: sawing, turning and glueing. Sawmills are the largest employer of the sector. Sawmills and board production are highly automatised, but manual skills are still needed in carpentry. Mechanical forest industry employs 26 000 people in Finland. In addition 9000 have a job in furniture production. There are also about 130 industrial sawmills as well as other companies in the wood products industry.

The largest companies are Stora Enso, UPM-Kymmene and Metsä Board. In 2005–2015 they had to jettison almost half of their employees as the paper production was declining. The companies searched new growth in packaging materials and wood-based chemicals.

Wood is also used as biomass (Energy in Finland#Statistics) and as heating material in stoves.
