= Industry in Finland =

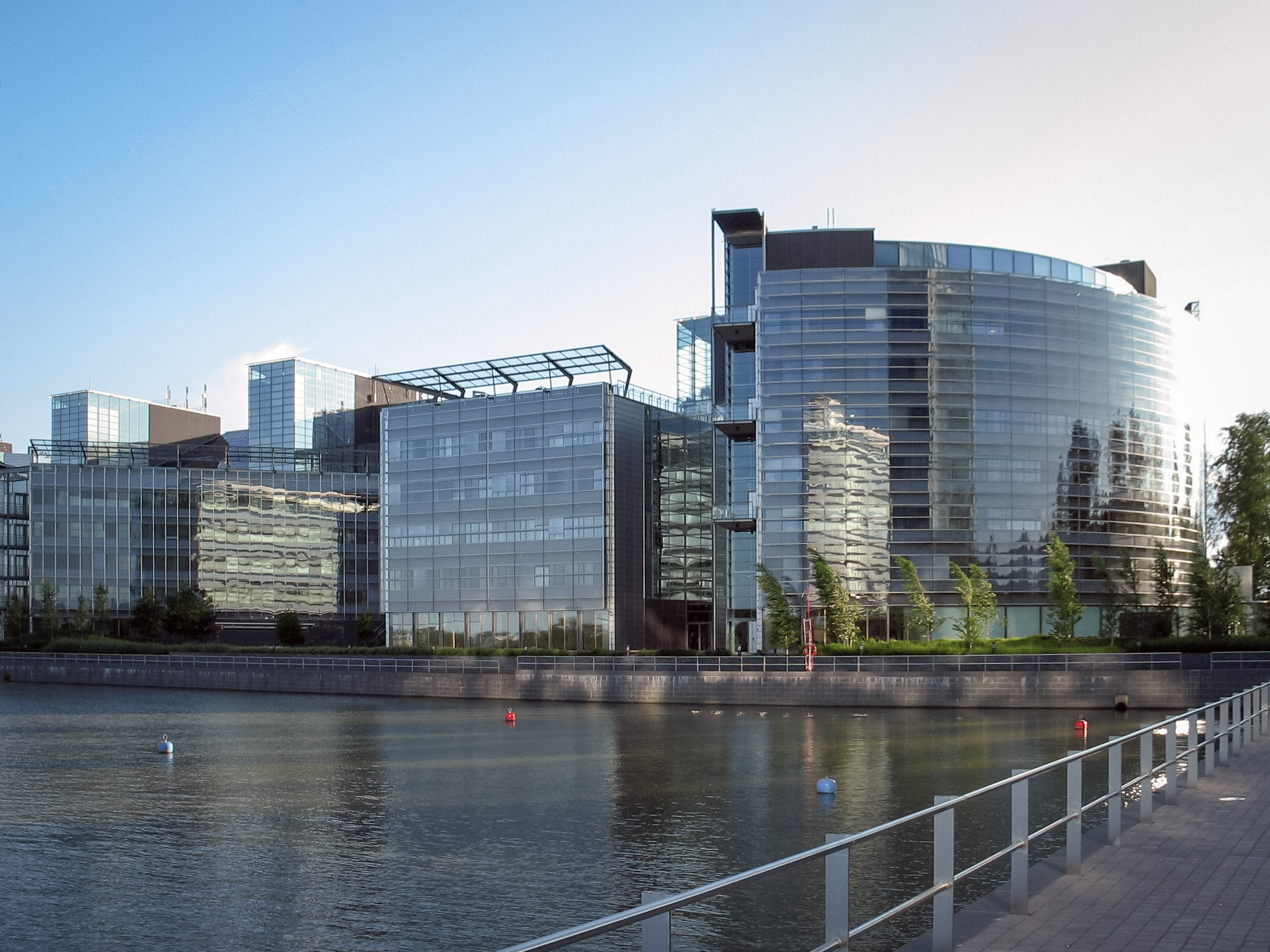
Nokia corporate headquarters, Keilaniemi, Espoo, Finland

Industry in Finland is the second largest sector of Economy of Finland after the service sector.

The production of different branches was in 2013 as follows:

- metal industry 37%
- chemical industry 26%
- forest industry 19%
- food, alcohol, and tobacco industries 11%
- other manufacturing 5%
- mining 1.5%
- textile and leather industry 0.7%.

Metal industry is divided to several branches. Finnish exports in 2014 included metals and metal products worth of 14.4%, machinery 12.8%, electronics 12% and vehicles 5.9%. Exports of electronics had decreased since the top years. Shipbuilding (Valmet, Wärtsilä) has long traditions. It In 2014, there were eight shipyards in Finland. They employ 20 000 people and export 90% of their production. Nokia and its subcontractors in mobile phones have dominated electronics.

Chemical industry is providing roughly one quarter of Finland's industrial production and exports. It employs directly 34 000 people. Neste Oil is the largest company in chemical industry.

Forest industry in Finland is at the moment providing a fifth of Finland's exports, a bit less of all industrial production and 15% of jobs. Its relative importance for Finnish economy has been decreasing significantly since the 1960s.
