= Portimo mine =

Gold mine in Lapland, Finland

- Location: Lapland, Finland
- Products: Gold, copper, nickel

The Portimo mine in Finland is one of the largest gold mines in the world. It is located in Lapland, in the north of the country. It has estimated reserves of 4.9 million oz of gold, 3.73 million oz of palladium and 1 million oz of platinum. The mine also has ore reserves amounting to 78.1 million tonnes grading 0.10% copper and 0.07% nickel.
