= Konttijärvi mine =

Mine in Finland

- Location: Lapland, Finland
- Products: Gold, copper, nickel

The Konttijärvi mine in Finland is one of the largest gold mines in the world. The mine is located in the north of the country, in Lapland. The mine has estimated reserves of 2.8 million oz of gold, 2.07 million oz of palladium and 0.58 million oz of platinum. The mine also has ore reserves amounting to 35.6 million tonnes grading 0.19% copper and 0.07% nickel.
