= Kask (surname) =

Family name

Kask is an Estonian surname meaning "birch". Notable people with the surname include:

- Aleksander Kask (1885–1950), Estonian politician
- Aleksander Kask (1902–1965), Estonian weightlifter
- Arnold Kask (1902–1994), Estonian linguist, philologist and professor
- Herman Kask (died 1918), Estonian politician
- Jana Kask (born 1991), Estonian singer
- Janne Kask, former singer of the Swedish band Brainpool
- Jens Kask (1966–2011), Swedish ice sledge hockey player
- Oskar Kask (1898–1942), Estonian politician
- Peet Kask (born 1948), Estonian politician
- Rein Kask (born 1947), Estonian politician
- Risto Kask (born 1985), Estonian civil servant and politician
- Teet Kask (born 1968), Estonian ballet dancer and choreographer
- Tim Kask (1949–2025), American editor and writer
- Tõnis Kask (1929–2016), Estonian director

== See also ==
- Kõiv, another Estonian surname meaning birch
