= Tukkilaiskisat =

Traditional timber

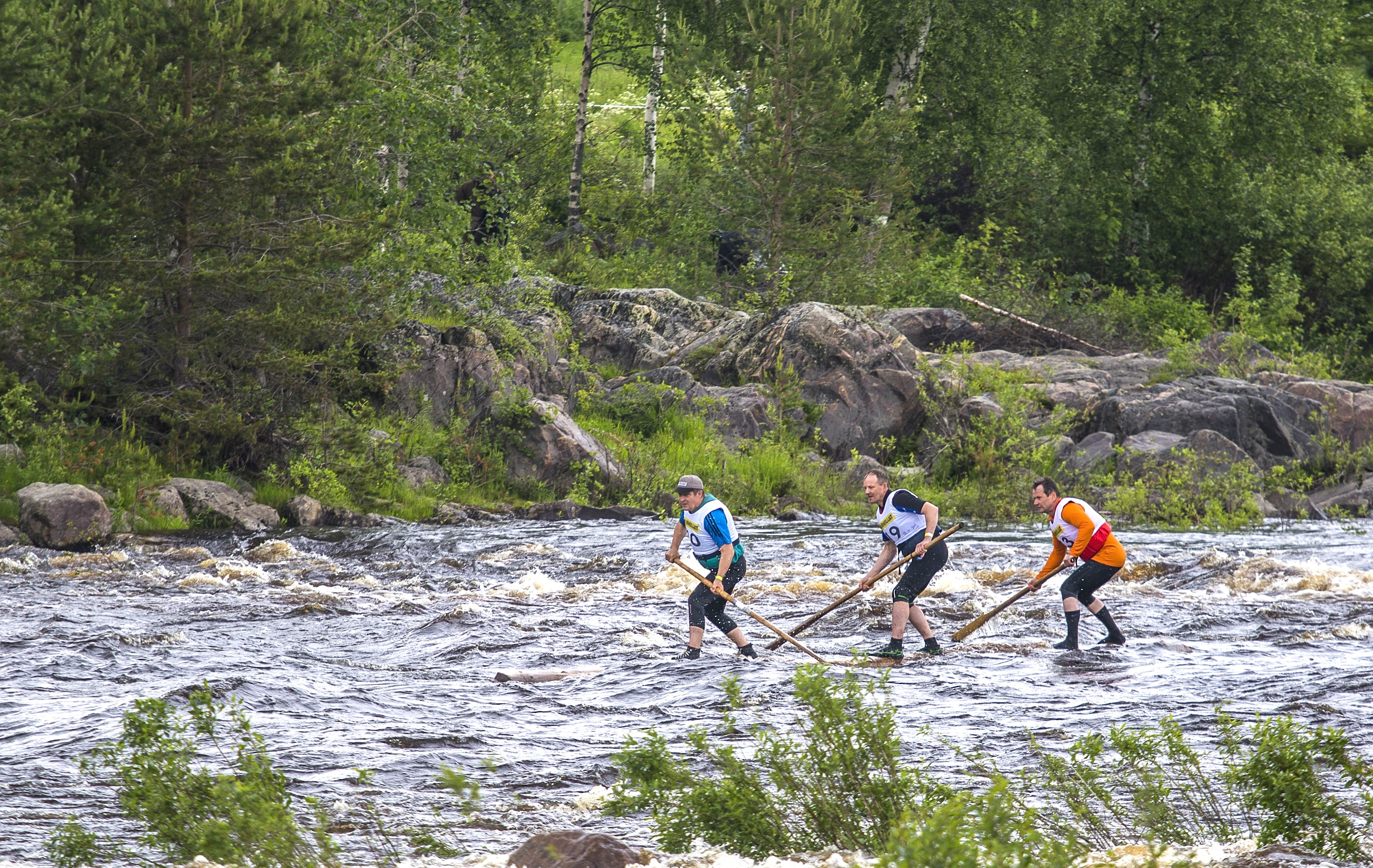

Tukkilaiskisat (Tukkilaiset) is a traditional timber rafting competition in Finland. Originally tukkilaiset referred to log drivers.

Recent sites where Tukkilaiskisat took place are Ii (Raasakkakoski), Kuusamo (Käylä), Laukaa (Kuusaankoski), Ylitornio (Kattilakoski), Imatra (Tainionkoski), and Lieksa. The 2017 championship was held in Torniojoki. Participants can be experienced or novices.

== Dates for summer 2026 ==
Kuhmo, Pajakkakoski 27.6.2026

Ii, Raasakkakoski 4.7.2026

Kuusamo, Käylä 11.7.2026 The Lumberjack competition in Kayla

== In popular culture ==
- Koskenlaskijan Morsian, (1923 film) produced by Erkki Karus.
- Laulu tulipunaisesta kukasta, (book) by Johannes Linnankoskis.
- Tukkijoella, (book) by Teuvo Pakkalas

Both books were also adapted into films.

- Me tulemme taas (2008 book) by Mauri Hast and Pekka lanko
- Tukkilaisen tulo ja lähtö (1996 book) by Hanna Snellman

== Gallery ==
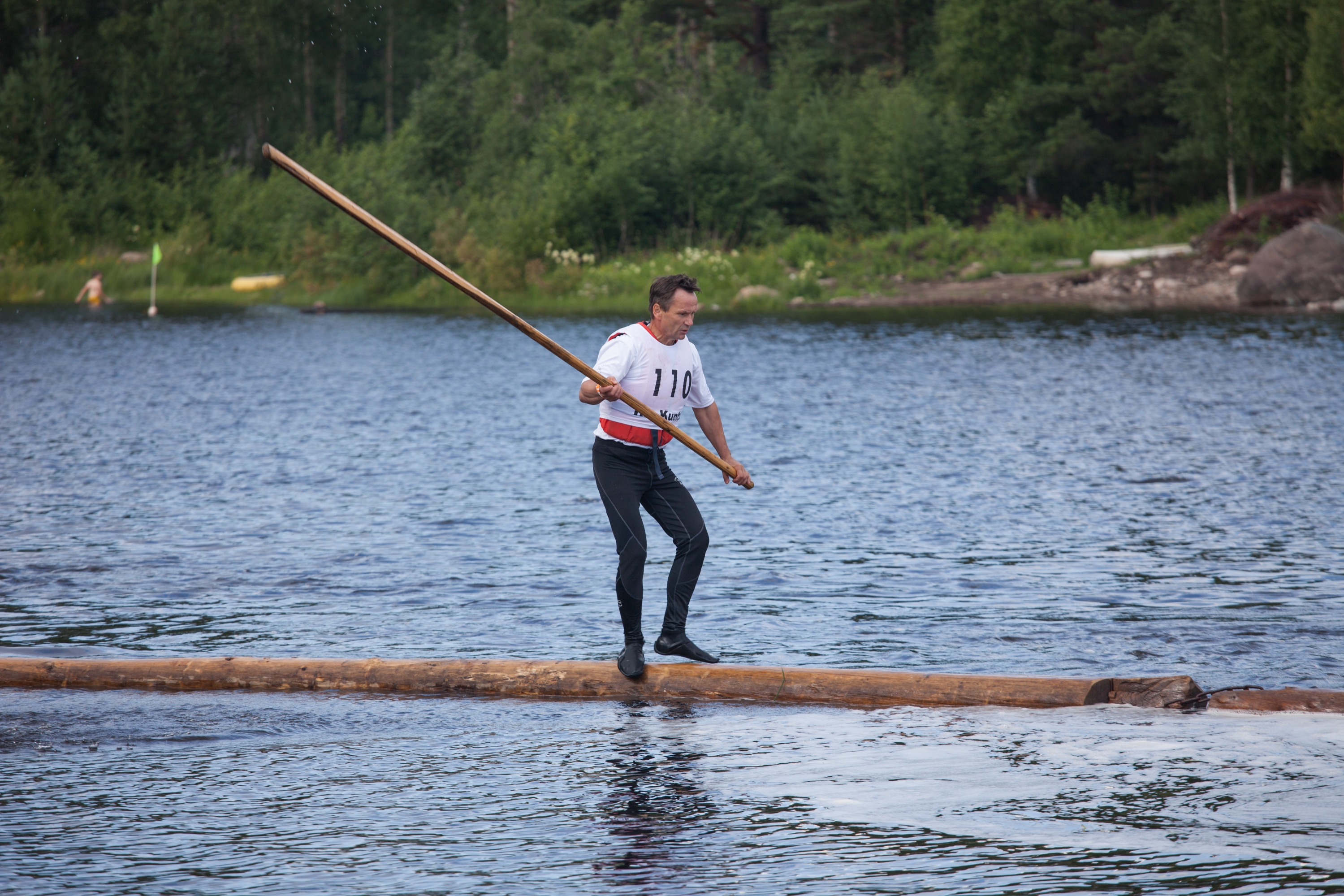
Puomillajuoksu

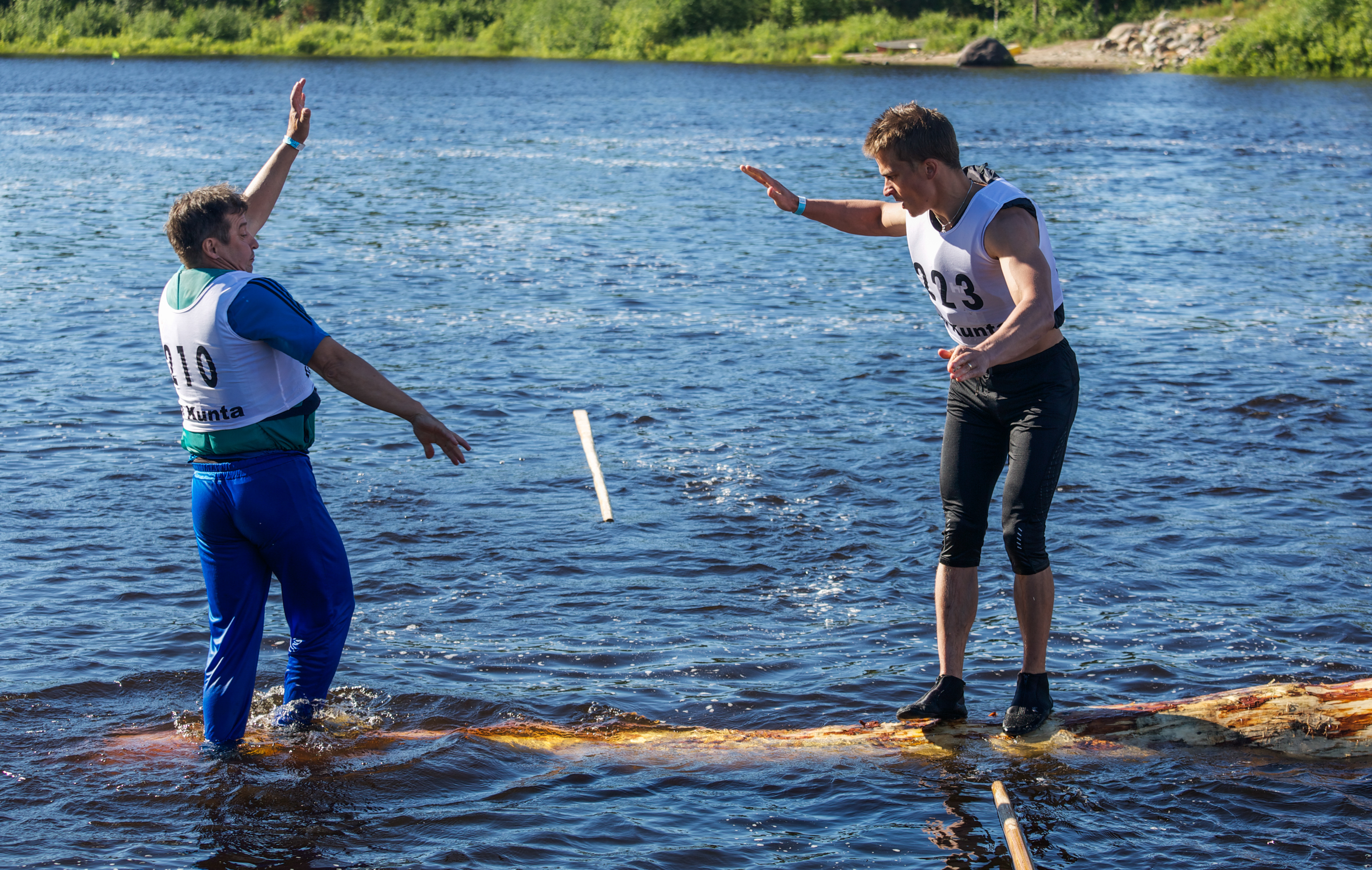
Rullaus

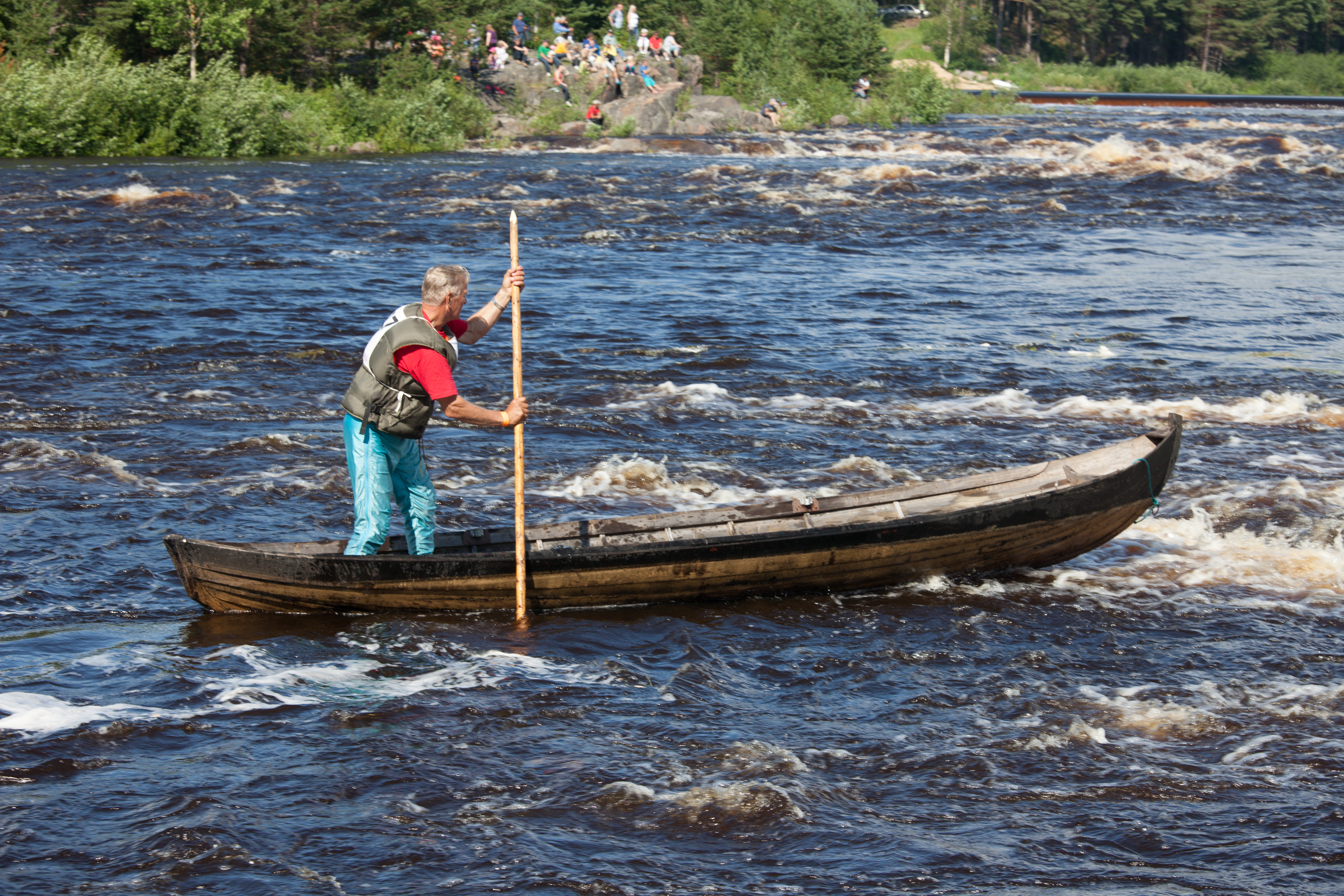
Sauvonta

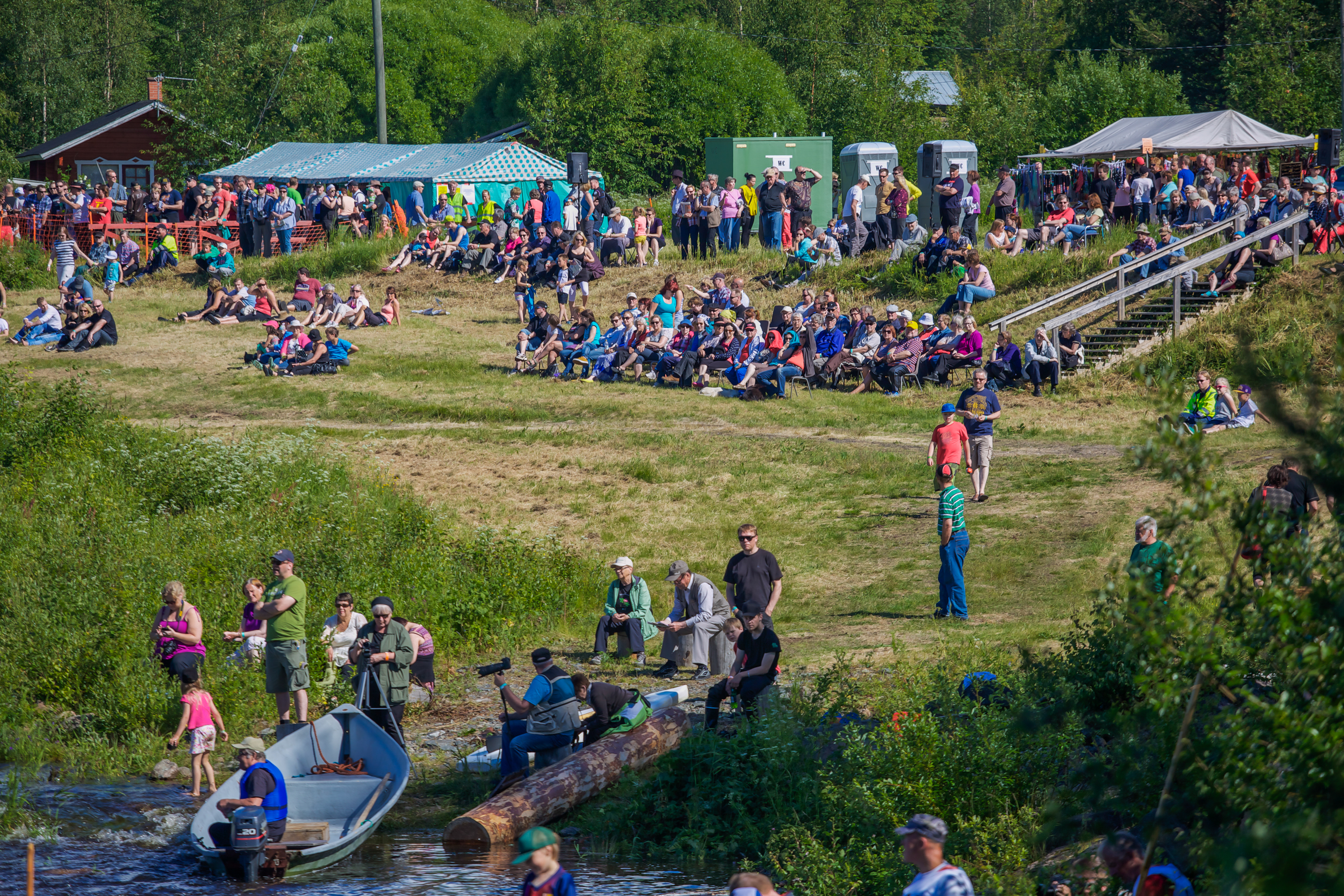
Audience in tukkilaiskisat, Ii
