= Kaasiku =

Kaasiku may refer to several places in Estonia:

- Kaasiku, Harju County, village in Kernu Parish, Harju County
- Kaasiku, Hiiu County, village in Hiiumaa Parish, Hiiu County
- Kaasiku, Jõgeva County, village in Mustvee Parish, Jõgeva County
- Kaasiku, Lääne County, village in Lääne-Nigula Parish, Lääne County
