= Mustavaara mine =

Vanadium mine in Oulu, Finland

Coordinates: 65.8071°N 28.0744°E

- Location within Finland
- Location: Oulu Province, Finland
- Products: Vanadium

The Mustavaara mine is one of the largest vanadium mines in Finland. Located in Oulu Province, the mine has reserves amounting to 30 million tonnes of ore grading 0.91% vanadium.
