= Suhanko mine =

Mine in Finland

Coordinates: 66°7′11.3″N 26°3′20″E

- Interactive map of Suhanko mine
- Location: Lapland, Finland
- Products: Gold, copper, nickel

The Suhanko mine (Finnish: Suhangon kaivos) in Finland is one of the largest platinum group element projects in the world. The mine is located in the north of the country in Ranua, Lapland. The project is estimated to host over 10 million ounces of combined palladium and platinum, with valuable quantities of copper, nickel and gold.
