= Risto Kask =

Estonian politician

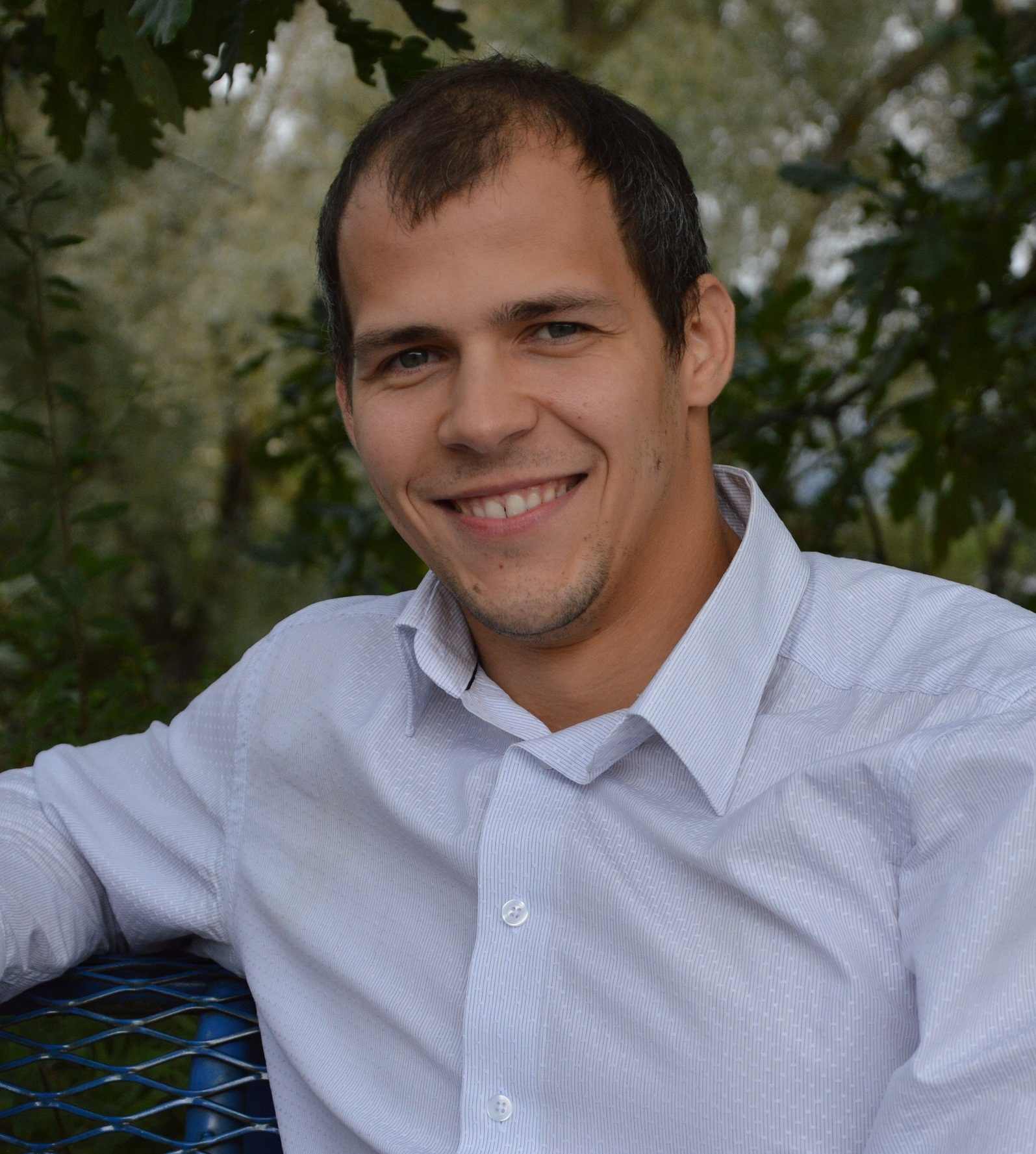
- Born: 24 November 1985 (age 40); Tallinn, then part of Estonian SSR, Soviet Union
- Education: BA - Accounting and Finance; MBA - Corporate Finance
- Alma mater: Estonian Business School (PhD)
- Occupation: Financial expert
- Years active: 2009-...
- Honours: Innovation Scholarship (2016)

Risto Kask (born 24 November 1985) is an economist and a founder and former CEO of non-profit organization MTÜ Aita Nõrgemat and a board member of MTÜ Ettevõtluskool Noor Eesti.

From 2014–2017, he worked as a deputy head of the Nõmme District. He has a BA degree on Accounting and Finance and MBA degree on Corporate Finance, both acquired from the Estonian Entrepreneurship University of Applied Sciences. He is currently pursuing a PhD degree on Management at Estonian Business School.

In 2016, he received an innovation scholarship from the city of Tallinn for his successful academic work.

== Membership in various organizations ==
- From 2008 – MTÜ Aita Nõrgemat, board member
- From 2008 – MTÜ Roheline Noor, board member
- From 2011 – MTÜ Ettevõtluskool Noor Eesti, board member
- From 2015 – Kodumaa Kapitali HLÜ, member of audit committee

== As an author ==
In 2015, he published a book Konnapoiste talvejutud. The book is for children aged 3–7, first edition was released in 720 units.

== Notable athletic achievements ==
- 1999 Championship of underwater swimming, up to 16-yo class – I place
- 2000 Championship of underwater swimming, up to 16-yo class – II place
- 2004 Aikido 5kyu rank
- 2005 Aikido 4kyu rank
- He is a member of jury of the competitions of "Eesti Suvepiiga ja Suvemees" and "Estonian Topmodel". In 2008, he was a member of the jury for "Manhunt Estonia"
- Triathlon Estonia 2022, Public distance III place
