= Koivu mine =

Titanium mine in Finland

- Location: Central Ostrobothnia, Finland
- Products: Titanium

The Koivu mine is one of the largest titanium mines in Finland. The mine is located in Central Ostrobothnia. The mine has reserves amounting to 62.2 million tonnes of ore grading 7.75% titanium. In 2012 it was acquired by Cove Resources.
