= Tax wedge =

Deviation from equilibrium price and quantity

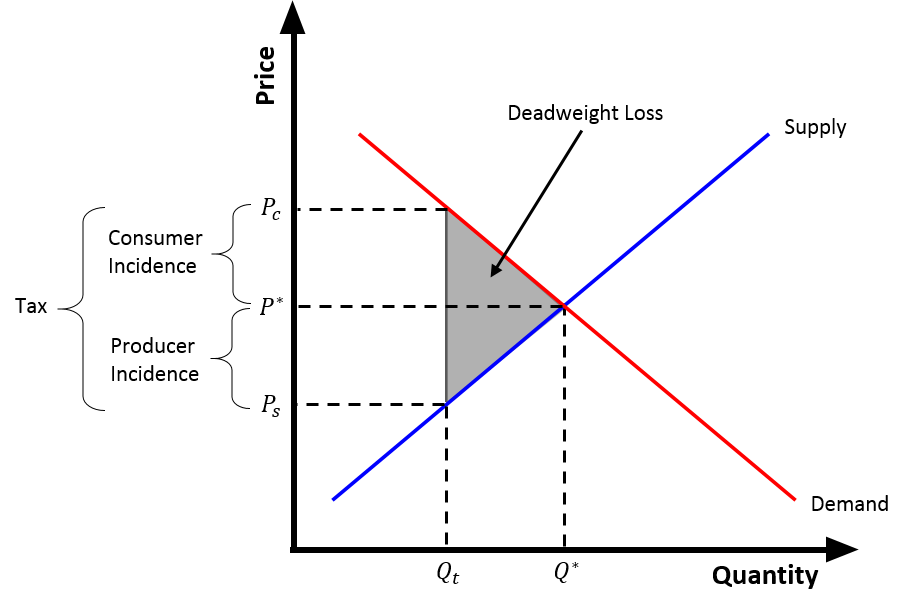
Graph of a tax wedge, showing consumer and producer incidence.

The tax wedge is the deviation from the equilibrium price and quantity ($P^*$ and $Q^*$, respectively) as a result of the taxation of a good. Because of the tax, consumers pay more for the good ($P_c$) than they did before the tax, and suppliers receive less for the good ($P_s$) than they did before the tax . Put differently, the tax wedge is the difference between the price consumers pay and the value producers receive (net of tax) from a transaction. The tax effectively drives a "wedge" between the price consumers pay and the price producers receive for a product.

Following the law of supply and demand, as the price to consumers increases, and the price received by suppliers decreases, the quantity that each wishes to trade will decrease. After a tax is introduced, a new equilibrium is reached, where consumers pay more $(P^* \rightarrow P_c)$, suppliers receive less $(P^* \rightarrow P_s)$, and the quantity exchanged falls $(Q^* \rightarrow Q_t)$. The difference between $P_c$ and $P_s$ will be equivalent to the size of the per-unit tax.

== Implications of a tax wedge ==
=== Deadweight loss ===
The filled-in "wedge" created by a tax actually represents the amount of deadweight loss created by the tax. Deadweight loss is the reduction in social efficiency (producer and consumer surplus) from preventing trades for which benefits exceed costs. Deadweight loss occurs with a tax because a higher price for consumers, and a lower price received by suppliers, reduces the quantity of the good sold. Thus, the equilibrium quantity of a taxed good is lower than the equilibrium quantity when the same good is not taxed. The deadweight loss created by the tax is equal to ${1 \over 2}\times \ Tax \ \times (Q^*-Q_t)$, represented by the shaded triangle in the figure.

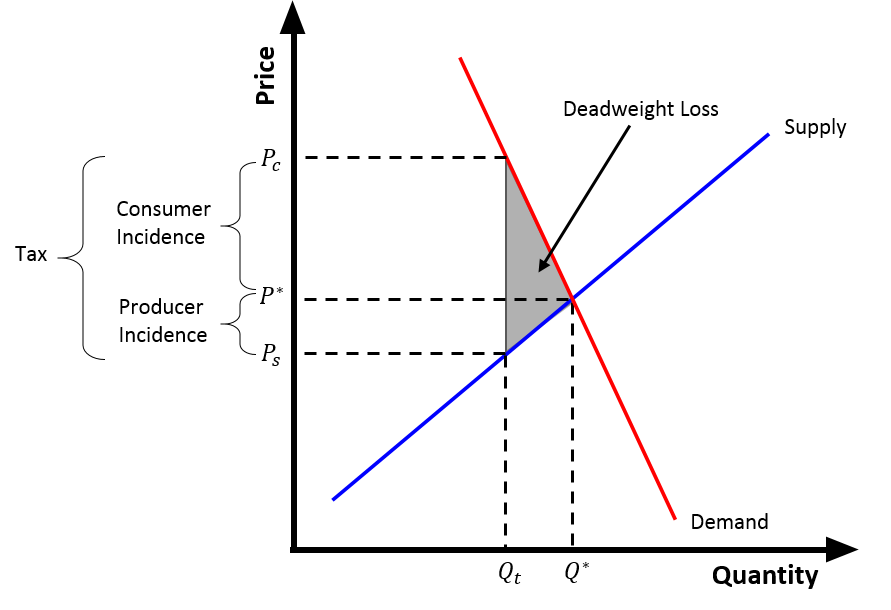
When demand is more inelastic than supply, consumers bear more of the tax. (Ex. cigarettes)

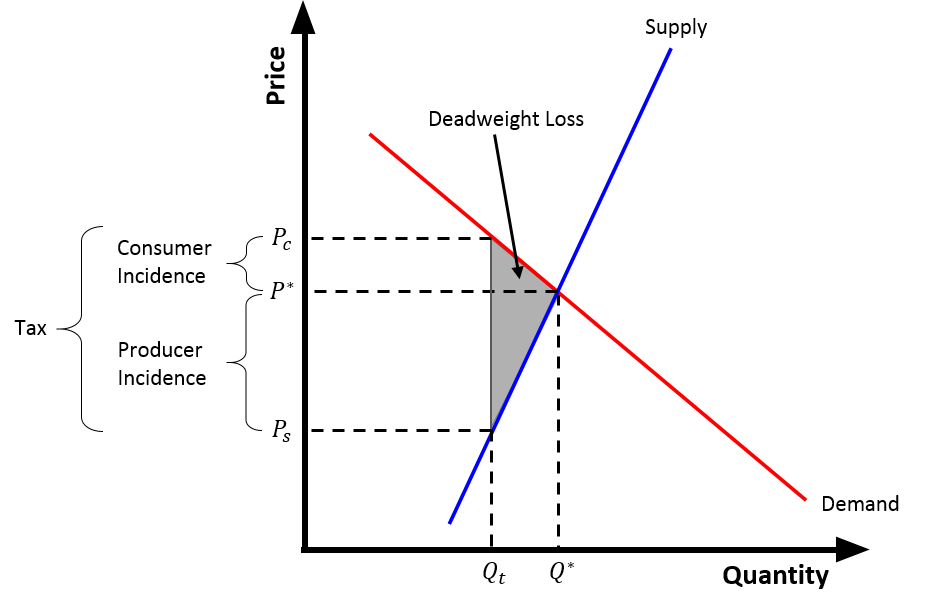
When supply is more inelastic than demand, producers bear more of the tax. (Ex. beachfront hotels)

=== Tax incidence ===
There are two types of tax incidence or tax burden created by a tax: the statutory incidence of a tax and the economic incidence of a tax. Typically, a general reference to "tax incidence" refers to the economic incidence of a tax.

The statutory incidence of a tax falls on the party, producers or consumers, that has to physically send a check to the government in the amount of a tax. For example, if a person directly pays his or her income tax to the government (with no employer withholding), the statutory burden would fall on consumers. If a tax is imposed on the producers of gasoline, however, the statutory burden would fall on producers.

The economic incidence of a tax falls on the party that bears the actual cost of the tax. Put another way, economic incidence reflects the actual change in an individual's or firm's resources due to the tax. The statutory incidence of the tax is irrelevant to the economic incidence of the tax. In fact, the economic incidence is completely determined by the elasticity of supply and demand. Typically, both producers and consumers bear some portion of the economic incidence of the tax, but these portions do not have to be equal. The party with the more inelastic (steeper) curve bears more of the tax. For example, consumers of tobacco products typically bear more of the tax on tobacco, because they are addicted to the product and their consumption is not strongly affected by price changes (demand is inelastic). Producers bear more of the tax when supply is inelastic; for example, producers of beachfront hotels would bear more of a tax on hotels and accept lower prices for their product, because a change in price would not have a large effect on the quantity of beachfront hotels. These examples are illustrated graphically (right). The economic incidence on consumers is equal to $P_c - P^*$, and the incidence on producers is equal to $P^* - P_s$.

Full shifting of a tax occurs when one party in a transaction bears all of the tax burden. When demand is perfectly inelastic, the tax burden is fully shifted onto consumers; when supply is perfectly inelastic, the tax burden is fully shifted onto producers. In the long run, however, supply and demand both become more elastic: consumers' preferences for a product can change (cigarette smokers can quit smoking), and suppliers can choose to reduce their investment in, or leave, the market (a hotel chain can decide to sell its beachfront properties). This means that the economic incidence on consumers and producers can change in the long run.

The size and impact of the tax wedge vary considerably across countries.

European countries, especially in Scandinavia, tend to have a high tax wedge due to comprehensive social security systems and robust public services. Countries like Belgium, Germany, and France have some of the highest tax wedges globally.
