= Kõiv =

Family name

Kõiv is an Estonian surname. The word means "birch" in Võro.

According to the Estonian Population Register, there lived 1,242 people with the surname Kõiv in Estonia, as of 8 May 2012.

Notable bearers of the name Kõiv include:

- Karl Kõiv (1894–1972), featherweight weightlifter
- Kauri Kõiv (born 1983), biathlete
- Kerli Kõiv (born 1987), singer and songwriter
- Küllo Kõiv (1972–1998), wrestler
- Madis Kõiv (1929–2014), author, physicist and philosopher
- Tõnis Kõiv (born 1970), politician
- Tõnu Kõiv (born 1968), politician

== See also ==
- Koivu, a Finnish surname of the same etymology
- Kask, a more common Estonian surname with the same meaning
