= Solidium =

Finnish investment company

Solidium is a Finnish state-owned investment company. Founded in 1991, Solidium's original purpose was to manage the property of SKOP Bank (Säästöpankkien Keskus-Osake-Pankki; fi), which went bankrupt in the early 1990s recession.

In 2008, Solidium's mandate became the management of the listed minority shareholdings of the Finnish state.

Previously, the government directly owned the stock, and transferring it to a single company was the work of Minister of Trade and Industry Jyri Häkämies. On August 1, 2022, the net asset value of Solidium was EUR 8,968 billion.

Aside from Solidium, the government still directly owns shares in three listed companies as a majority shareholder.

== Holdings ==
Solidium took over the state-owned shares in 2008 of Kemira, Metso, Outokumpu, Rautaruukki, Sampo, Sponda, Stora Enso, and Telia, and in 2009 Elisa.

Solidium acquired over 5% of Outotec Mining Technology Company's shares in March 2012, while Goldman Sachs reduced its ownership to less than 5%. 5% is the limit of the obligatory stock information note in Finland.

Solidium has also bought Talvivaara mining stocks and sold all shares of Sponda. In February 2024, Solidium sold their shares in Kemira Oyi for about $124 million as well as their shares in Mandatum.

Company	% of company owned
Anora Group	19.4
Elisa Oyj	10.0
Konecranes	11.1
Metso Oyj	14.9
Nokia Oyj	6.0
Nokian Tyres	10.1
Outokumpu Oyj	15.5
Sampo Oyj	6.2
Stora Enso Oyj	10.7
Tietoevry Corporation	10.9
Valmet Corporation	10.1

The Finnish state also directly owns shares of certain publicly listed companies, deemed to be strategically important, that are not in Solidium's portfolio. These include Finnair (55.8%), Fortum (50.8%), and Neste Oil (50.1%).

== Corporate governance ==
Solidium Oy managing director is Kari Järvinen. The members of Solidium's Board of Directors are chairman (interim) Heikki Bergholm, Markku Hyvärinen (Varma, Tradeka), Marketta Kokkonen (Espoo municipality), Anni Vepsäläinen (Finnish Fair Corporation), and Eero Heliövaara (Ownership steering department of the Prime Minister's Office).
