= Katajanokan Laituri =

Coordinates: 60°9′57.95″N 24°57′41.45″E

Katajanokan Laituri (Finnish for "The Katajanokka Pier") is a four-storey wooden office and hotel building in Katajanokka, Helsinki, Finland, completed in July 2024. The building hosts the head office of the company Stora Enso. It is one of the largest wooden buildings in the Helsinki City Centre. As well as the Stora Enso head office, the building hosts the restaurant Luppo, the hotel Pier 4 and cafés, restaurants and conference spaces. The building has a flat green roof with multiple plant species. The building is made of light-coloured wood and has a curved shape.

== History ==
In 2020, the insurance company Varma started building a new wooden building called Katajanokan Laituri in Katajanokka, which would include the Stora Enso head office as well as other offices, a hotel and public spaces open to the citizens. The designer of the building was chosen with an international competition, which was won by Anttinen Oiva Arkkitehdit. The pillar shaft chassis of the building was made of laminated veneer lumber and its internal structures were made of cross-laminated timber.

The building's structure was designed by Sweco. The materials came from Stora Enso's own factories in Finland and Sweden.

The construction took two years in total.

== Acknowledgements ==
- Upon completion in 2024 the building was awarded the Wooden building of the year prize in Finland.
- In 2025 it was awarded the press wooden architecture prize at the 14th Forum International Bois Construction (FBC) event in Paris. It was said to fit into the environment, and the building was said to present wood in a beautiful way in the details as well as the load-bearing structures.
- In 2025 the building was nominated for the Finlandia prize in architecture.

== Gallery ==
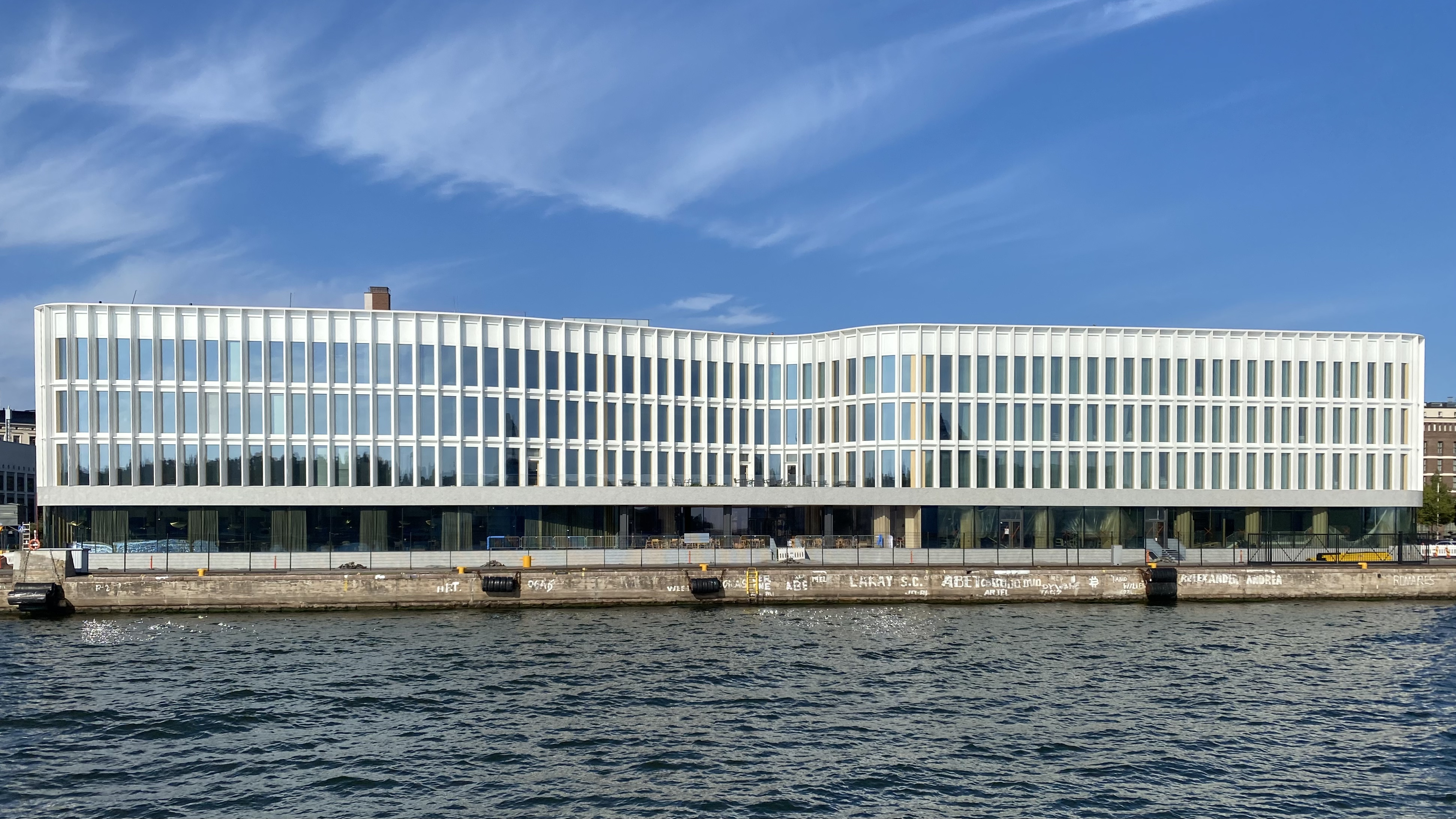
The facade to the seaside.

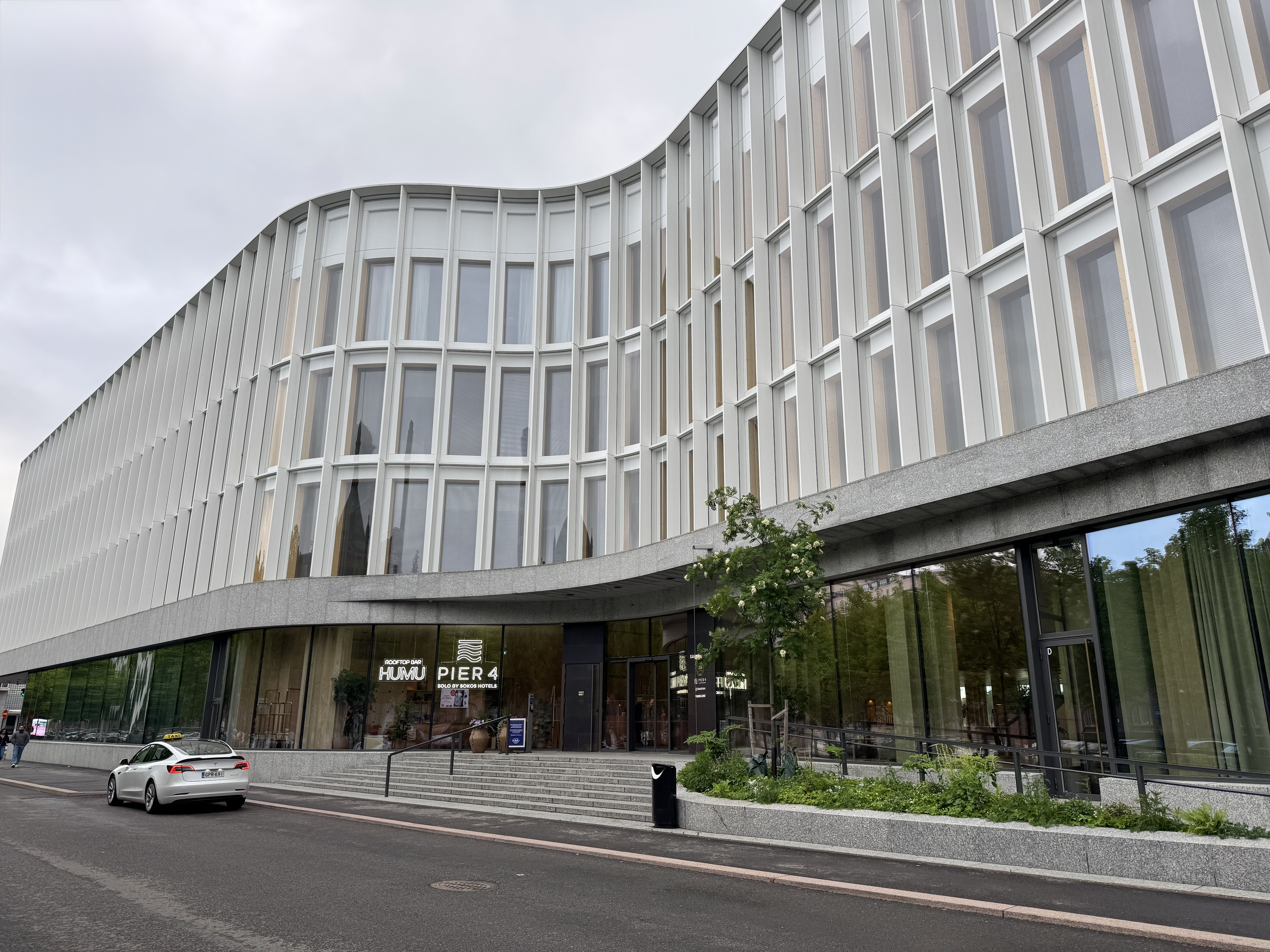
The entrance from the street.

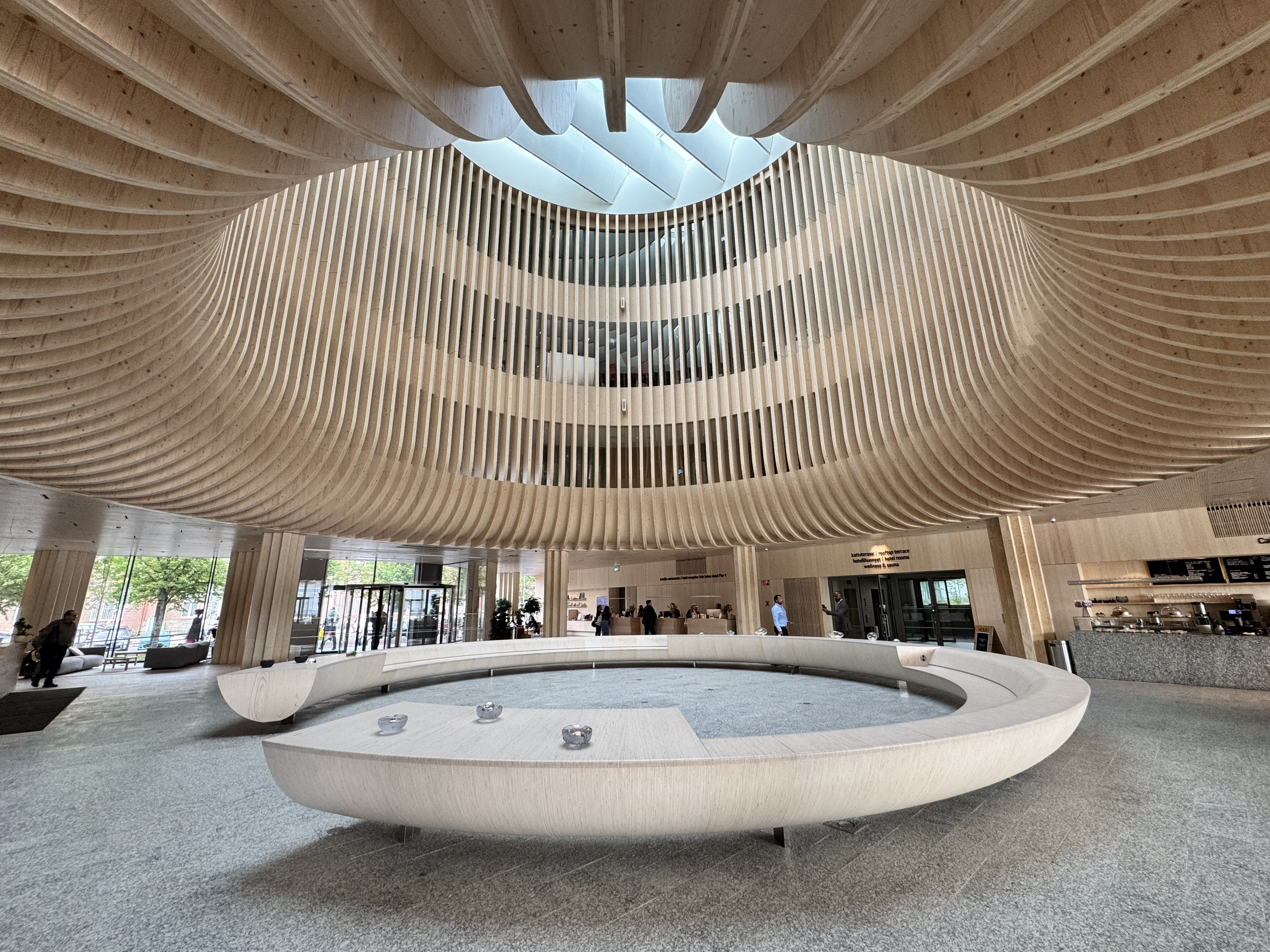
The entrance lobby.

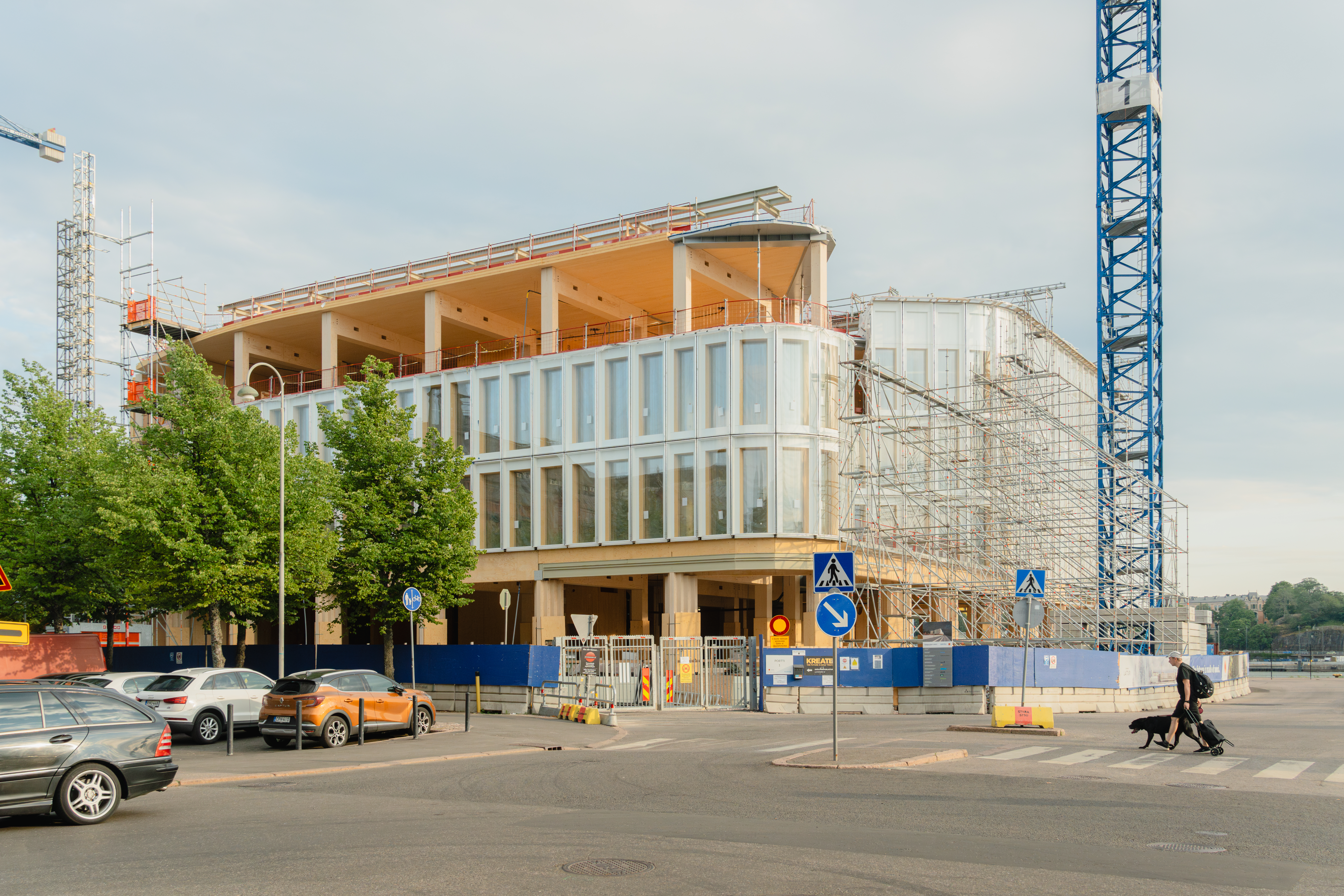
The building under construction in June 2023.

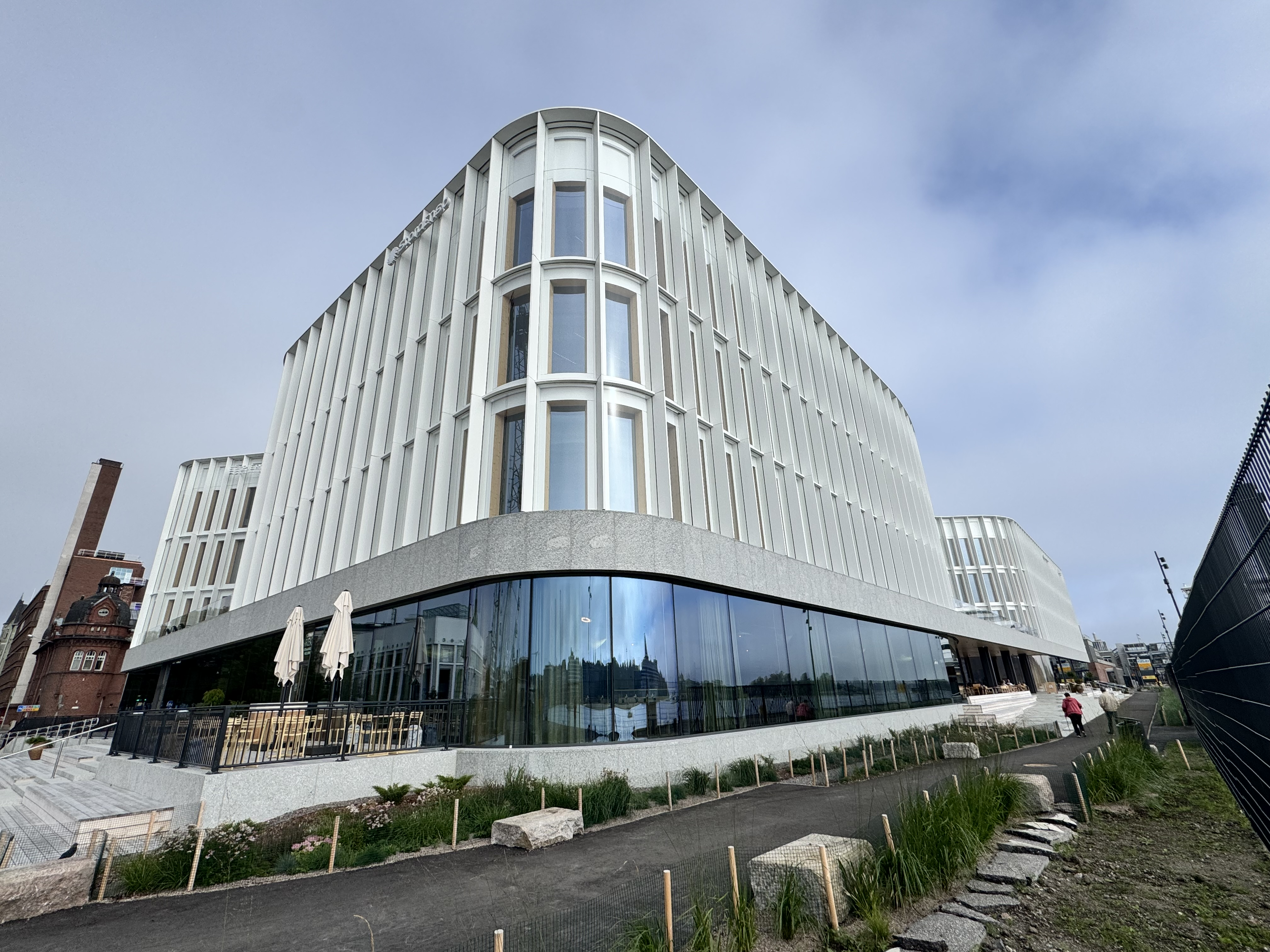
The building in September 2025.

== See also ==
- Stora Enso headquarters
