= Norrmén house =

Coordinates: 60°10′04″N 024°57′31″E

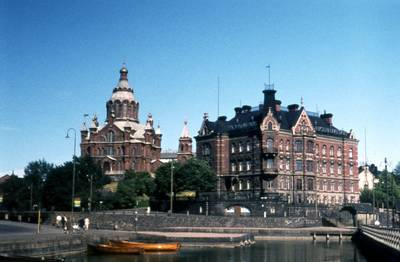
Normén house on the right

The Norrmén house, also known as the Norrmén castle and palace, was a red brick residential house representing the neo-renaissance architecture, situated for 63 years in Katajanokka, Helsinki, Finland, opposite the Uspenski Cathedral. It was designed by architect Theodor Höijer for the chairman of the Helsinki city council, Alfred Norrmén, who ordered the building plans from Höijer in 1896.

The four-floor building was constructed at a fast pace, and the building was already completed in 1897. The top floor of the building contained high-class large apartments, while the much smaller apartments on the bottom floor were mainly reserved for servants. Alfred Norrmén himself lived in the building until his death in 1942. The building also hosted the Eastern Emigrants Club and its restaurant until 1944, when it was discontinued.

Later the building hosted the Allied Commission.

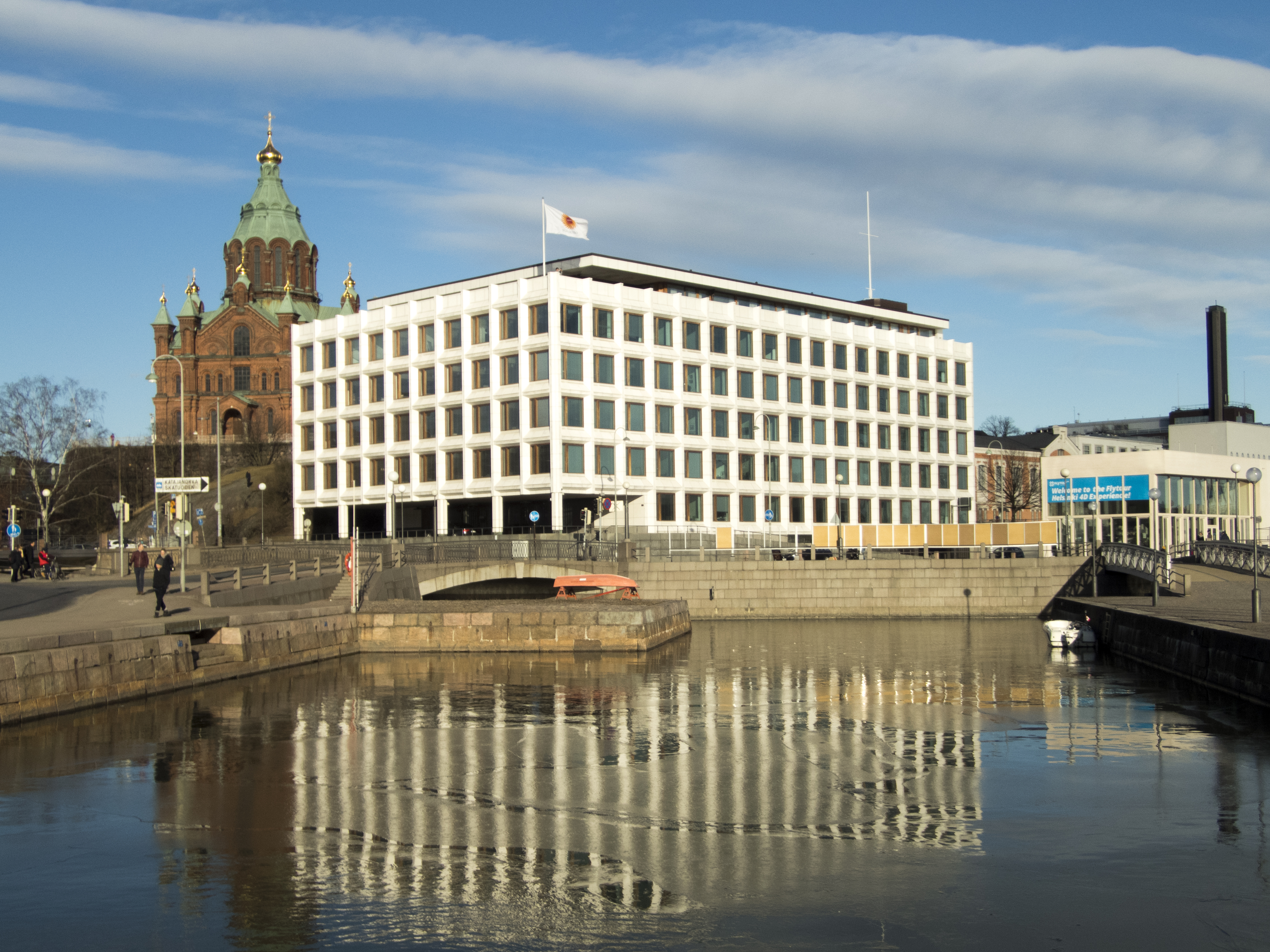
The Stora Enso headquarters, nicknamed "the sugar cube", has stood at the place of the Norrmén house since 1962.

The Norrmén house was dismantled in 1960. The Enso-Gutzeit (currently Stora Enso) main office, built from white marble and designed by Alvar Aalto, was built in its place. It was completed in 1962.

The dismantling of the house has been criticised ever since the year of its dismantling, and many view Aalto's new building in its place as completely unfit for the façade of Katajanokka, and the dismantling of the Norrmén house as one of the greatest wrongdoings in the history of Helsinki. Some have even proposed that Aalto's building should be dismantled and a replica of the Norrmén house should be built in its place. However, the city of Helsinki, along with the National Board of Antiquities is strongly in favour of preserving the main office building.

In the 2004 film Pelikaanimies, directed by Liisa Helminen, the Norrmén house has been digitally built back in its place.
