= Jukka Mäkelä =

Finnish politician

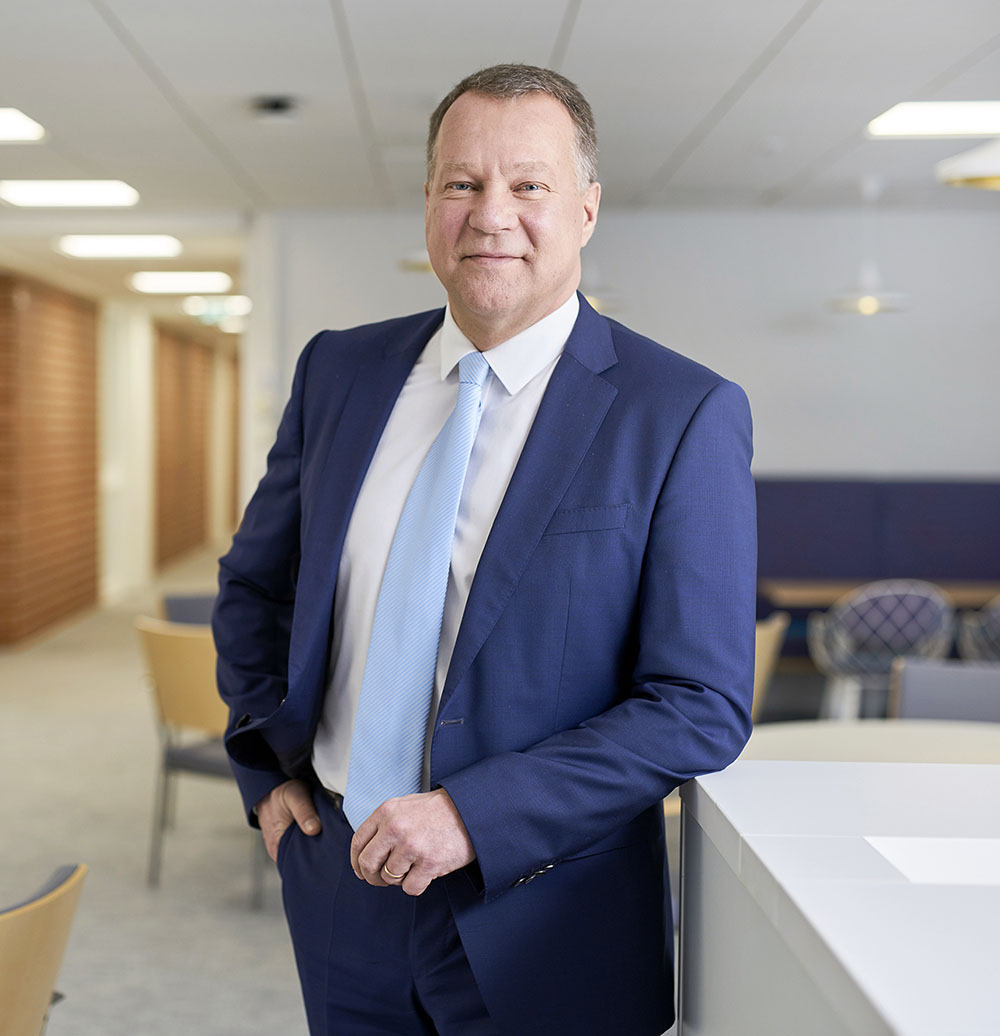

City Manager of Espoo
- Incumbent
- Assumed office 1 January 2011
- Preceded by: Marketta Kokkonen

Personal details
- Born: 7 July 1960 (age 66) Espoo, Finland
- Party: National Coalition Party
- Spouse: Saijaliisa Mäkelä

Jukka Mäkelä (born 7 July 1960 in Espoo) is a Finnish politician from the National Coalition Party and the current city manager/mayor of Espoo, the second largest city of Finland, since 1 January 2011. He was elected to the Parliament of Finland (Eduskunta) in the 2007 parliamentary election, but he was resigned after he was elected to the post of mayor. He is married and he has three children.

Jukka Mäkelä was a member in the HOK Elanto administration board (hallintoneuvosto) during 2008–2012. HOK Elanto is part of S Group (SOK). This is third biggest company and leading retail trade company in Finland in 2012. HOK Elanto has business e.g. in hotels, shopping centers, restaurants and petrol stations (Energy in Finland).

Jukka Mäkelä is member of Helsinki district administration of Chamber of Commerce (valtuuskunta) in 2013.

== Elections ==
In the municipal elections Jukka Mäkelä got 1,973 votes out of 113,000 in 2008.
