= Kemira =

Finnish chemicals company

Kemira Oyj

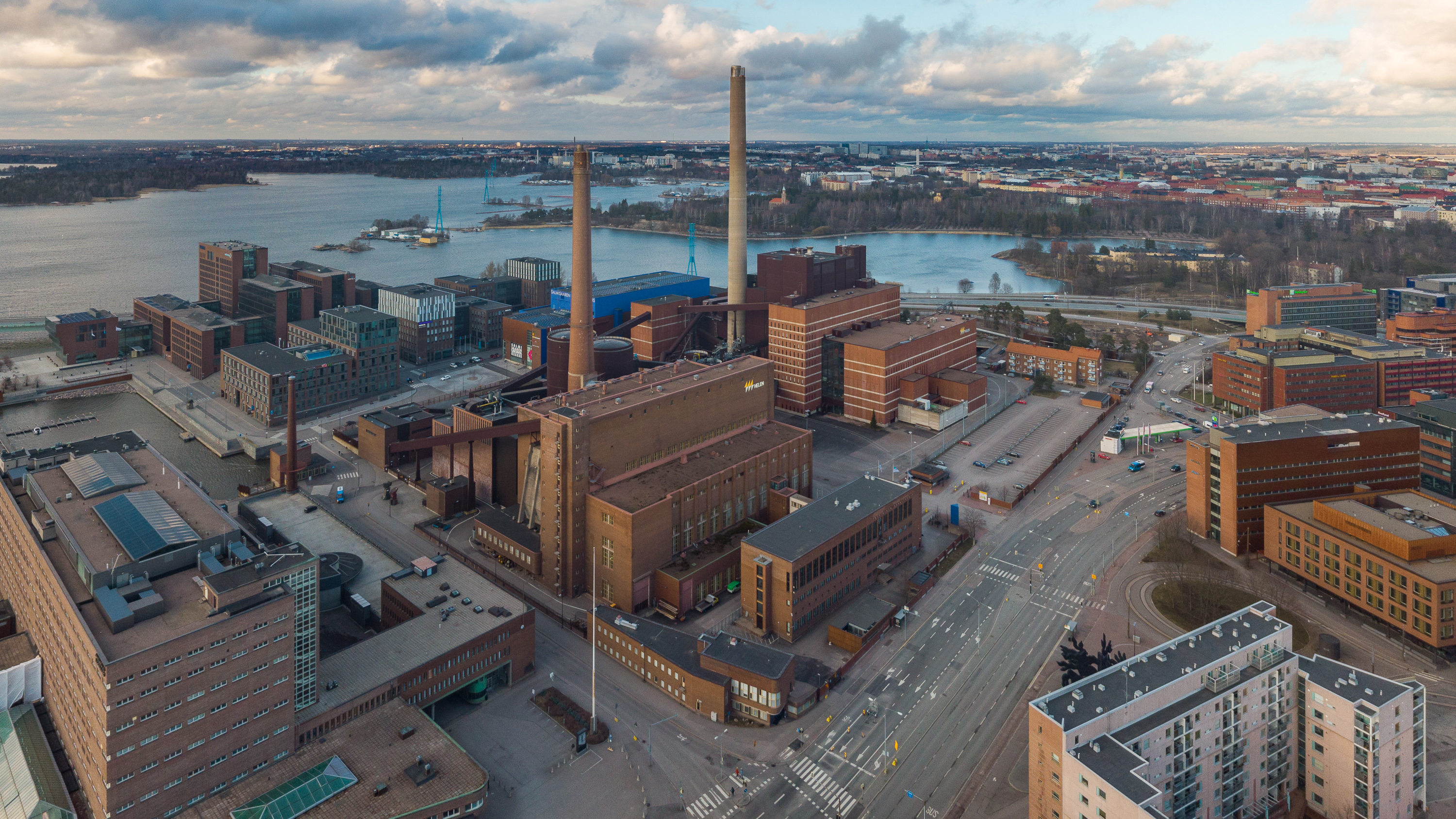
- Kemira Headquarters is located in Salmisaari, Helsinki
- Type: Julkinen osakeyhtiö
- Traded as: Nasdaq Helsinki: KEMIRA
- Industry: Chemicals
- Founded: 1920; 106 years ago
- Headquarters: Helsinki, Finland
- Key people: Matti Kähkönen (Chairman); Antti Salminen (President and CEO); Petri Castrén (CFO)
- Products: Chemicals for fibre treatment, water treatment and separation
- Revenue: ▼€2.948 billion (2024)
- Operating income: ▲€399 million (2024)
- Net income: ▼€199 million (2023)
- Total assets: ▼€3.489 billion (2023)
- Total equity: ▼€1.684 billion (2023)
- Number of employees: ▼4,746 (end 2024)
- Website: www.kemira.com

Kemira Oyj (Nasdaq Helsinki: KEMIRA) is a chemical industry group headquartered in Helsinki, Finland. The company was established in 1920 and operates in three business areas: Water Solutions, Packaging & Hygiene Solutions, and Fiber Essentials.

== History ==
Kemira’s history begins with the State Sulphuric Acid and Superphosphate Plants, founded in 1920. When it became known in Finland that machinery for a sulphuric acid plant was for sale in Germany, the plant was purchased and a company (Kemira) was established around it.

The company supplied chemicals needed to supply the Finnish industrial, mining, and fertilizer production sectors.

In 1971, Typpi Oy — active in nitrogen industry in Oulu since 1952 — was merged into the company, and Rikkihappo Oy became Kemira Oy.

Kemira Oyj was listed on the Nasdaq Helsinki in 1994.

In 2008, the company decided to focus on water chemistry.

After Russia’s invasion of Ukraine, Kemira announced in March 2022 that it would suspend deliveries to Russia and Belarus. In May, the company stated it would exit the markets entirely.

In February 2024, the company’s oil and gas business was sold in the United States to Sterling Specialty Chemicals LLC.

== Organization ==
The company's headquarters is located in Salmisaari, Helsinki, and its research centers are in Espoo, Shanghai, and Atlanta.

Antti Salminen became Kemira's President and CEO in February 2024.

Kemira's main shareholder is Oras Invest Oy and its owners, members of the Paasikivi family. Its former main owner, the State of Finland through Solidium, sold the largest part of its holding to Finnish investors in August 2007 and divested its remaining shares in 2023-2024. In 2024, Oras Invest holds 23% of Kemira's shares.

Kemira has three business areas: water treatment, fiber products, and packaging and hygiene. The related business units are Water Solutions, Packaging & Hygiene Solutions, and Fiber Essentials.
