= Rautaruukki =

Finnish company

Rautaruukki Oyj
- Company type: Julkinen osakeyhtiö
- Industry: Basic resources, Metal industry
- Founded: 1960
- Headquarters: Helsinki, Finland
- Area served: Worldwide
- Key people: Reino Hanhinen (Chairman), Sakari Tamminen (President and CEO)
- Products: Manufacture and supply of metals and metal products
- Revenue: ▲€2.798 billion (2011)
- Operating income: ▲ (€22 million) (2011)
- Net income: ▼ (€79 million) (2010)
- Total assets: €2.539 billion (end 2010)
- Total equity: €1.389 billion (end 2010)
- Number of employees: 11,820 (average, 2011)
- Website: ruukki.com

Rautaruukki Oyj, using the marketing name Ruukki, is a Finnish company, headquartered in Helsinki, which manufactures and supplies metal-based components and systems to the construction and engineering industries. In 2014 Swedish SSAB bought Ruukki.

The company was founded in 1960 by the Finnish Government to provide the steel supply needed by the nation's heavy industries. Since part-privatization in 1994, the state has gradually decreased its holding in Rautaruukki.The firm consists of three business areas: construction, engineering and metals. Rautaruukki produces a range of products for clients in various industries, including cabins and chassis for heavy vehicles, hot rolled steel plates and coils, roofing sheets and building and bridge structures.

== Ownership ==
On 31 December 2011 the principal shareholders were:

1. Solidium: 39.67%
2. Ilmarinen Mutual Pension Insurance Company: 3.72%
3. Varma Mutual Pension Insurance Company: 2.51%
4. The State Pension Fund: 1.39%
5. ODIN Fund Management: 1.03%

== Gallery ==
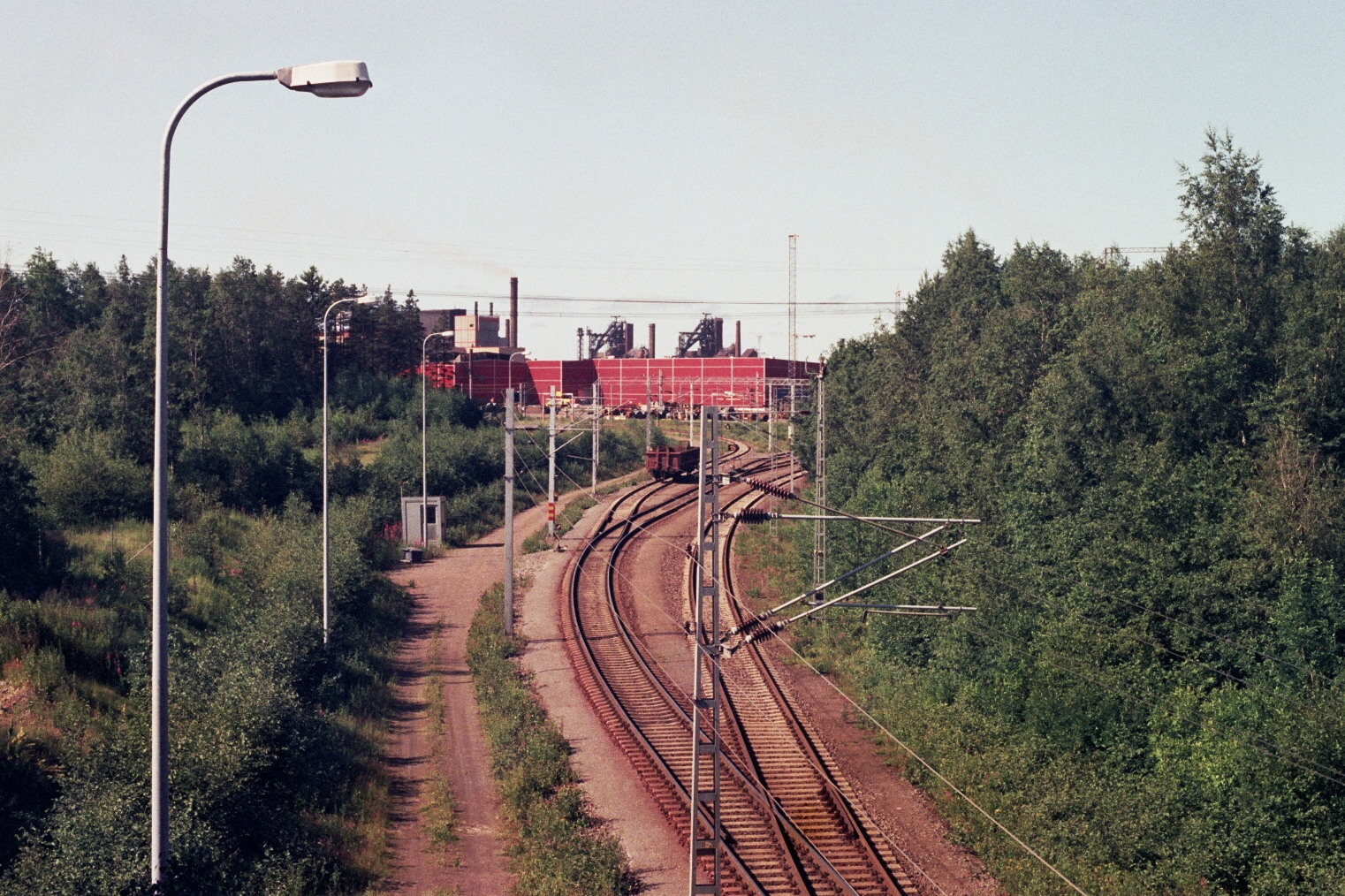
Rautaruukki steel factory in Raahe Jul2009 001

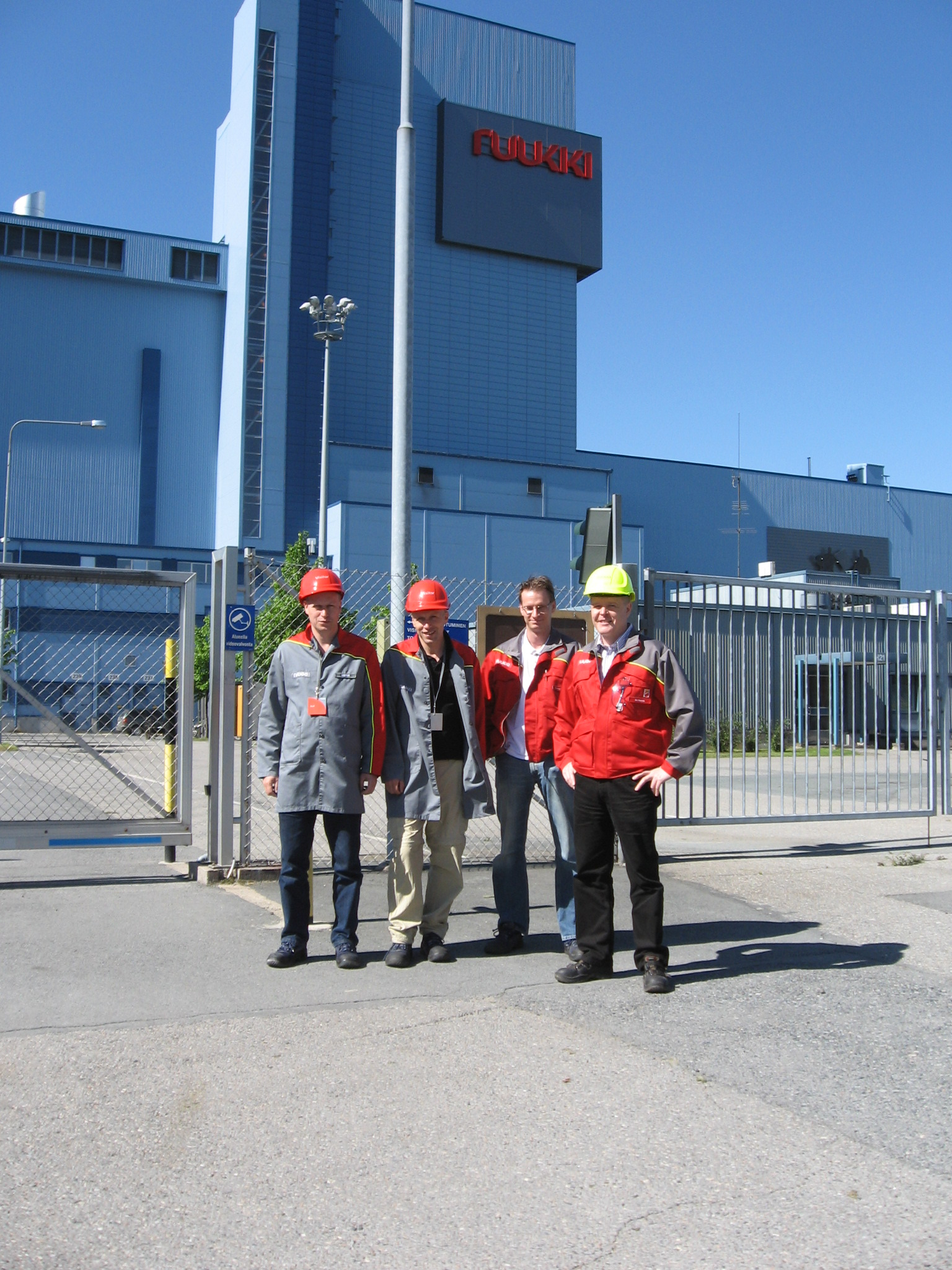
Four employees of Ruukki before the rolling mill in Hämeenlinna

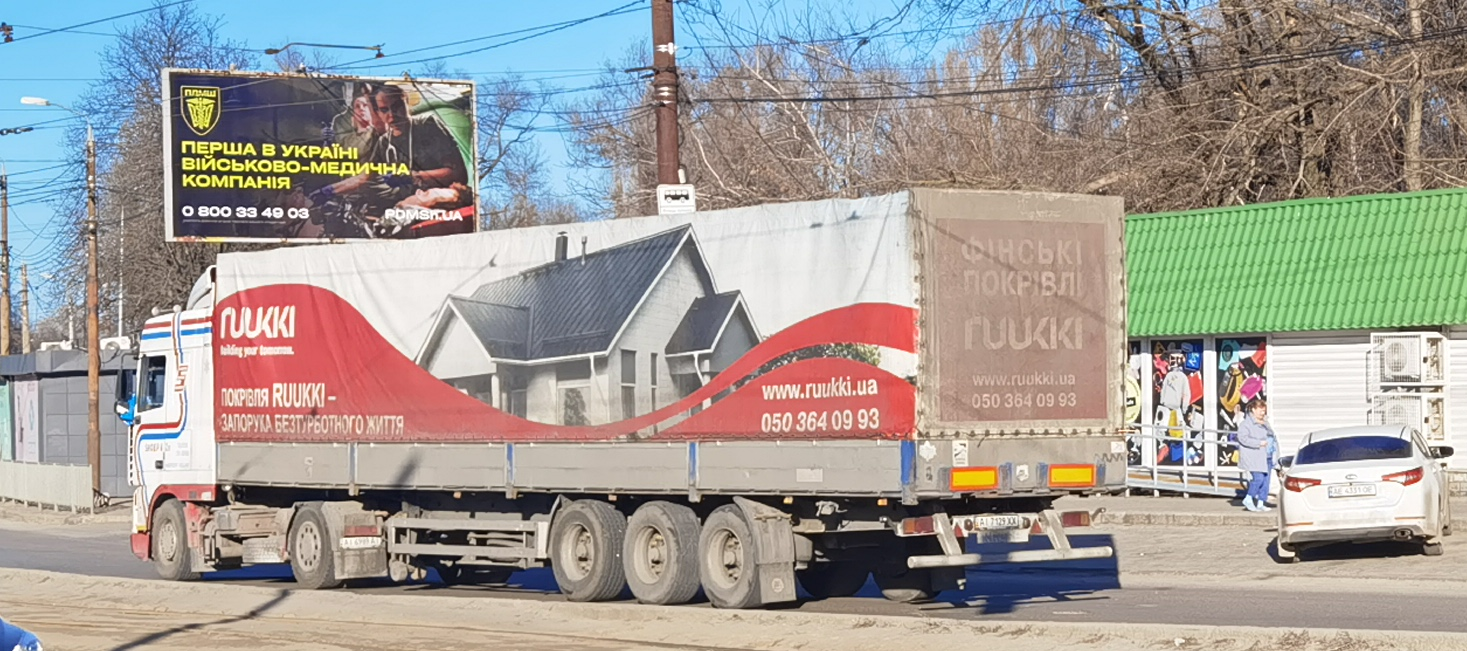
Ruukki truck in Dnipro, Ukraine
