= William Lehtinen =

Finnish forestry executive

Vuorineuvos William Lehtinen
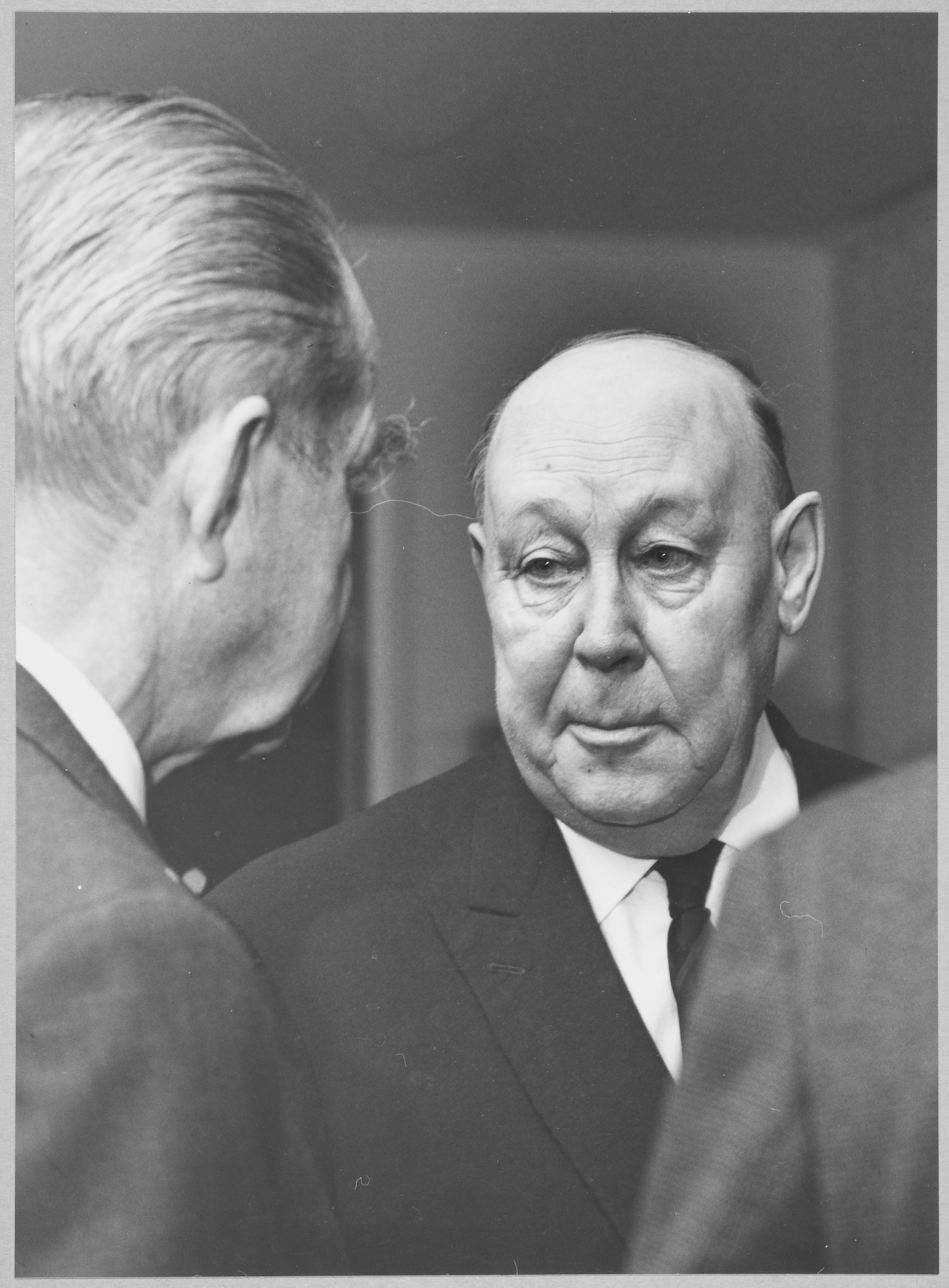
- Lehtinen in 1965, in conversation with ex-Prime Minister J. W. Rangell
- Born: Uuno Wilhelm Lehtinen; 19 March 1895; Turku, Grand Duchy of Finland
- Died: 23 March 1975 (aged 80); Turku, Finland
- Occupations: Industrialist, forester
- Known for: CEO of Enso-Gutzeit
- Spouse: Greta Skogster (m. 1935)

Uuno Wilhelm "William" Lehtinen (1895—1975) was a Finnish forester and business executive, most notable for his long career at the Finnish state-owned forestry and paper company Enso-Gutzeit (now part of Stora Enso), which he steered to become the largest manufacturer of paperboard in Europe.

== Education ==
Lehtinen graduated from secondary school in 1916. He obtained a degree in forestry management from the University of Helsinki in 1923, followed by postgraduate studies at Yale University, from where he graduated with a Master of Forestry in 1926. Afterwards he undertook a year's research placement at the Forest Products Laboratory in Madison, WI.

== Business career ==
After completing his studies in the USA, Lehtinen served as a Commercial Attaché at the Consulate-General of Finland in New York City.

He started at Enso-Gutzeit in sales and management roles in 1930, was appointed to the Board of Directors in 1935, and eventually ascending to the Chief Executive and Chairman's position in 1945.

The company's original production facilities had been located in and near the town of Enso, in eastern Finland. Following the ceding of much of Finnish Karelia to the Soviet Union at the end of the Continuation War, these facilities were lost, and the company had to invest heavily to rebuild its production capacity from scratch. Lehtinen embarked on such an ambitious investment programme, that within seven years the pre-war production figures were exceeded, and by the time he retired a decade later in 1962, Enso-Gutzeit had grown to be the largest manufacturer of paperboard in Europe, with sizeable presence also in other segments of the forestry and paper industries. Lehtinen oversaw the building and commissioning of a total of eight new paper and paperboard factories.

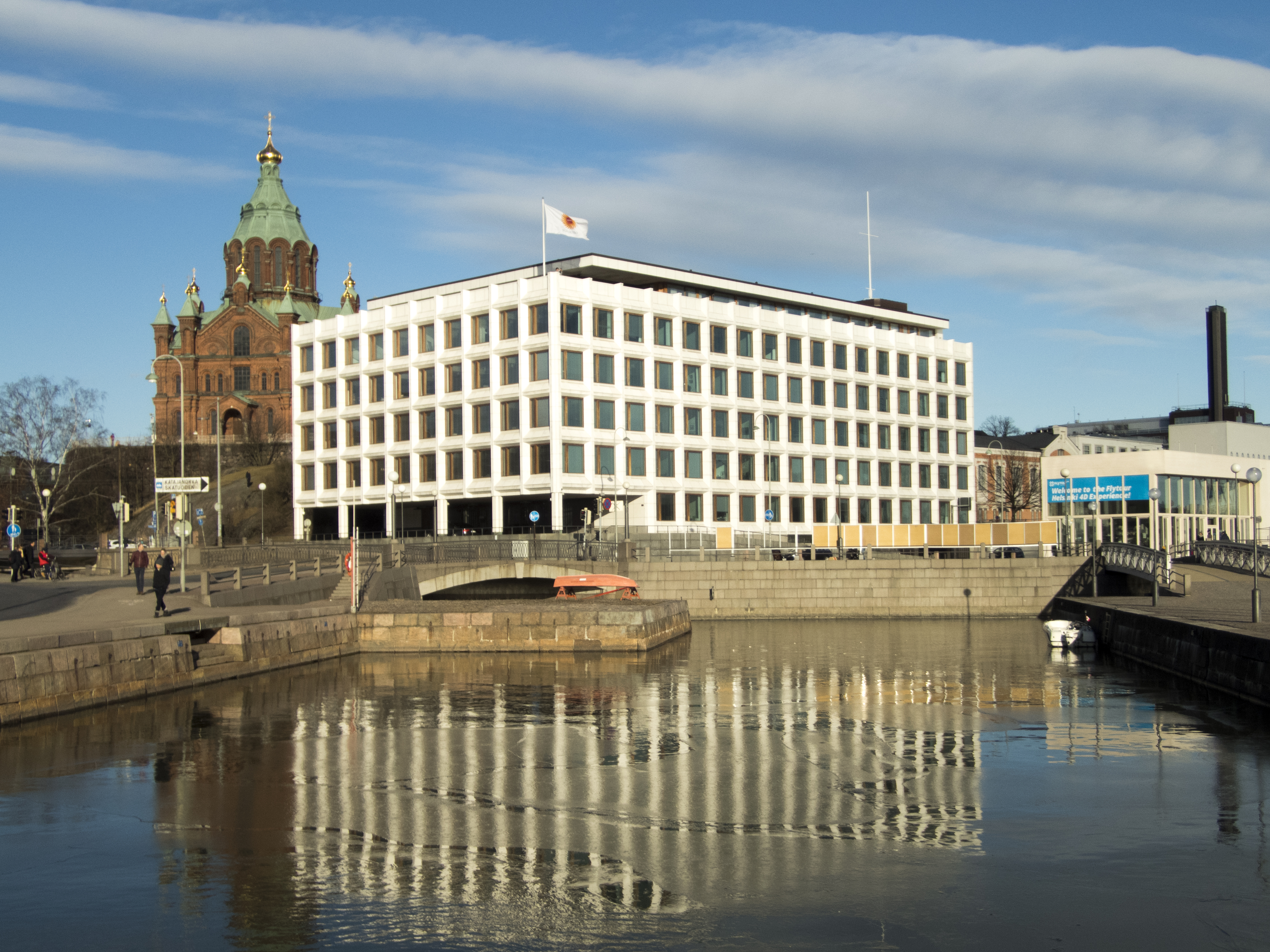
The Enso headquarters commissioned by Lehtinen

Lehtinen also started Enso-Gutzeit's shipping operations in 1947. This was initially done in order to boost the company's own export capabilities, but in time the activity grew into a sizeable business in its own right, which operates still today under its Finnlines brand, since 2016 as part of the Italian Grimaldi Group.

During his tenure, the company built its opulent and controversial headquarters, designed by Lehtinen's friend, architect Alvar Aalto, completed in 1962 and situated in central Helsinki in a prominent position across the street from the Presidential Palace.

Lehtinen also served in Board roles at various Finnish business and forestry trade associations and other similar organisations.

== Awards and honours ==
Lehtinen was awarded the honorary title of Vuorineuvos in 1946.

In 1947, he was appointed Chairman of the local organising committee for the 1952 Summer Olympics in Helsinki.

In 1958, an Honorary Doctorate in agriculture and forestry science was conferred on Lehtinen.

== Personal life ==
The nickname 'William', by which Unto Lehtinen was known for most of his life, dates back to his time in the USA, where he spent a total of eight years during the 1920s.

Lehtinen was married to the textile artist Greta Skogster, and they had one son.

They were both active patrons of art, as well as notable collectors.

In 1964, the couple set up a charitable foundation in their name, with the aim of promoting international relations in the artistic and scientific spheres. They wanted to convert their home in the Kuusisaari district of Helsinki into an art museum, but were not successful in obtaining planning permission; they also planned to renovate a medieval Italian castle and operate it as an artists' residence, but that plan did not materialise, either. However, in 2020, the Lehtinen Foundation finally succeeded in opening an artists' residence in Helsinki.
