= Greta Skogster =

Finnish textile artist

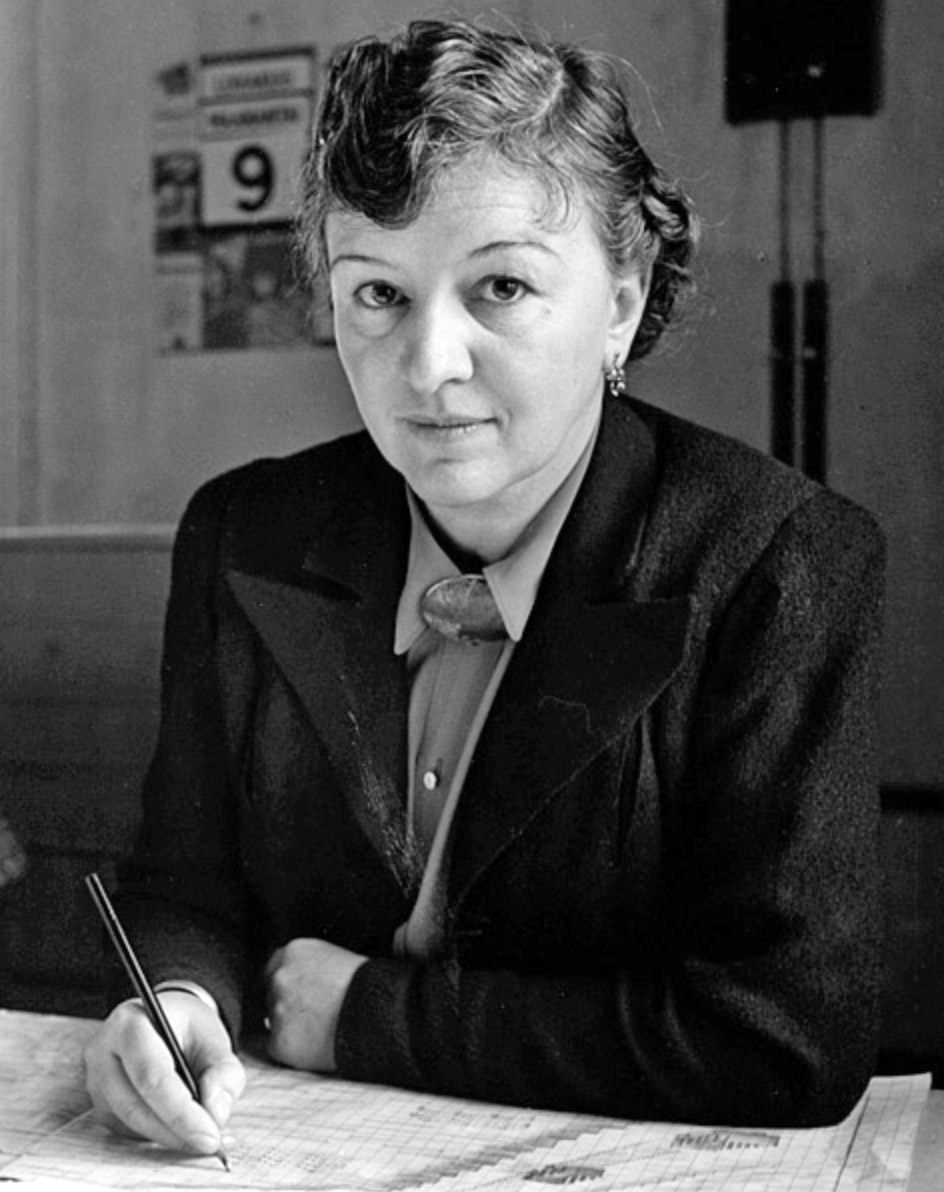
- Born: 22 February 1900; Hämeenlinna, Grand Duchy of Finland
- Died: 11 February 1994 (aged 93); Tampere, Finland
- Occupation: Textile artist
- Spouse: William Lehtinen (m. 1935; died 1975)

Greta Skogster (from 1935 Skogster-Lehtinen; 1900–1994) was a Finnish textile artist, notable as the leading designer of the 1930s and 1940s and a pioneer of modern textile design in Finland.

== Education ==
After graduating from the Swedish-language secondary school Svenska samskolan i Tavastehus in Hämeenlinna, Skogster was encouraged, at age 15, by a family friend, the architect and painter Armas Lindgren, to study design drawing and draughtsmanship at the Central School of Industrial Design (Taideteollisuuskeskuskoulu) in Helsinki, now part of the Aalto University School of Arts, Design and Architecture. Afterwards she went on to learn flat weaving techniques at the renowned Wetterhoff domestic arts and crafts college in Hämeenlinna.

== Career and legacy ==
In 1921, Skogster set up her own weaving, dying and textile design business, first in Hämeenlinna, later relocated to Helsinki; after getting married she moved the operation to Enso, but it had to be evacuated back to Helsinki on account of the outbreak of Winter War. She ran her business continuously for over half a century, until her retirement in 1974.

Skogster is remembered especially for her complex, large-scale design projects for public buildings, churches, corporate headquarters, and the like. Her most notable works include the 1930-31 furnishing textile and carpet designs for the newly built Finnish Parliament building, which are considered her professional breakthrough. She also designed interior furnishings for large passenger ships, upon the personal request by the architect Alvar Aalto.

She is among other things known for her work in modernising the design language and methodology of the traditional Finnish ryijy wall hangings and other tapestries.

When raw materials were in short supply during the war years, she created her now-iconic line of wallpaper designs using birch bark and straw.

Skogster's works received awards and commendations at the Milan Triennial V in 1933, as well as the World Expos in Brussels (1935), Paris (1937) and New York (1939).

Her oeuvre has been described as exceptionally large and varied.

== Personal life ==
Greta Skogster was born to a Swedish-speaking upper-middle-class family, as the daughter of banker Anders Skogster and millner Agnes Hilbinger.

She was married to Vuorineuvos William Lehtinen, a long-time managing director of the forestry and paper company Enso-Gutzeit (now part of Stora Enso); they had one son.

In 1964, the couple set up a charitable foundation in their name, with the aim of promoting international relations in the artistic and scientific spheres. They wanted to convert their home in the Kuusisaari district of Helsinki into an art museum, but were not successful in obtaining planning permission; they also planned to renovate a medieval Italian castle and operate it as an artists' residence, but that plan did not materialise, either. However, in 2020, the Lehtinen Foundation finally succeeded in opening an artists' residence in Helsinki.
