= Helsinki Court House =

Courthouse in Helsinki, Finland

- Helsingin oikeustalo
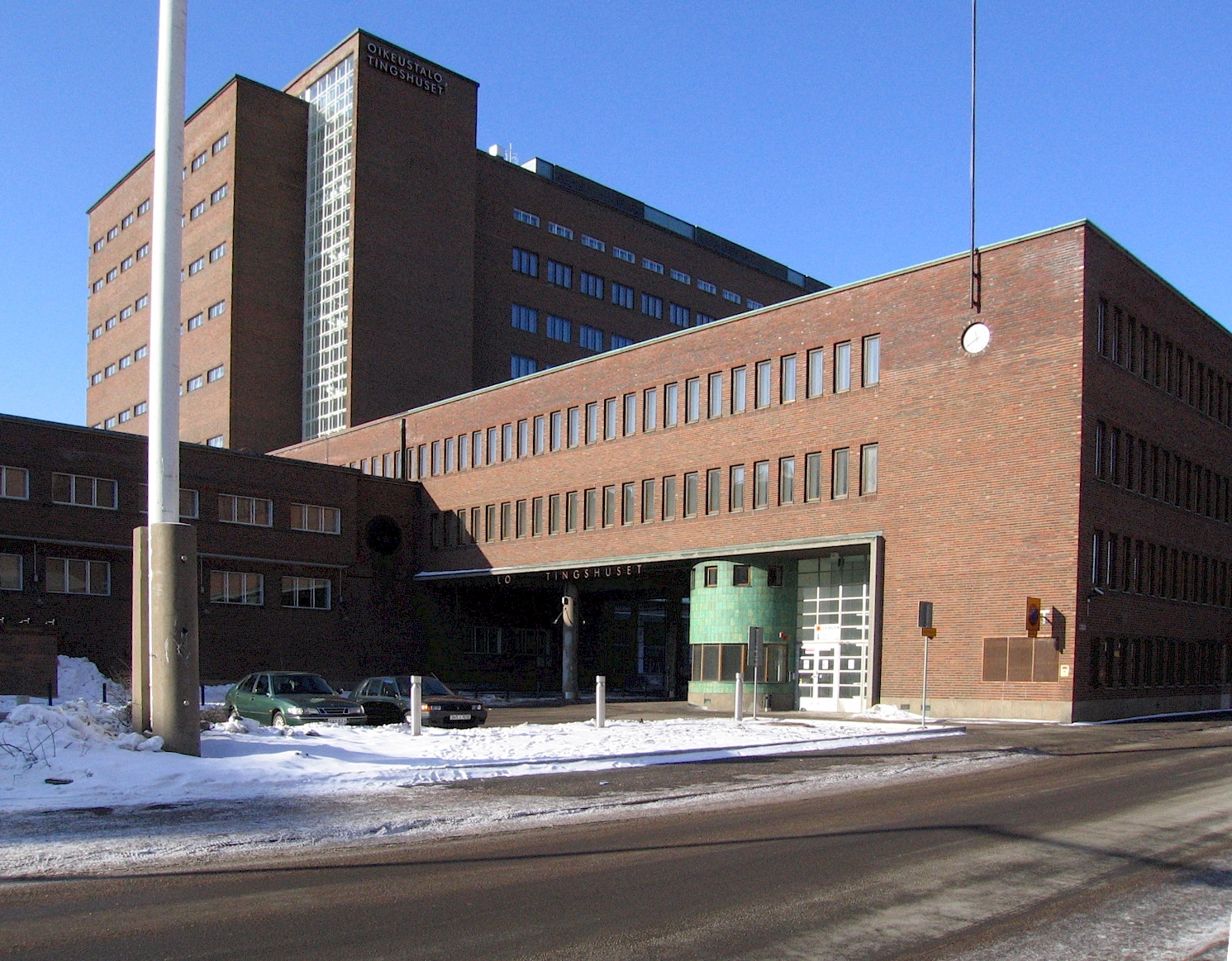
- Interactive map of the Helsinki Court House area

General information
- Architectural style: Industrial
- Location: Helsinki, Finland
- Coordinates: 60°09′49″N 024°54′03″E
- Construction started: 1937
- Completed: 1940
- Client: Alko
- Owner: City of Helsinki

Design and construction
- Architect: Väinö Vähäkallio

Helsinki Court House (Finnish: Helsingin oikeustalo) is situated on Salmisaari in Helsinki, Finland. Designed by Väinö Vähäkallio, it was constructed between 1937 and 1940 as Alko's headquarters, factory and main storage, and was partially reconstructed in 2004, when it became a court house.

Stylistically the building is a modernist updating of 19th-century warehouses, massive and with slight curves and no detailing except heavily framed strip windows and rounded entrance bays.
