= Hans Gutzeit =

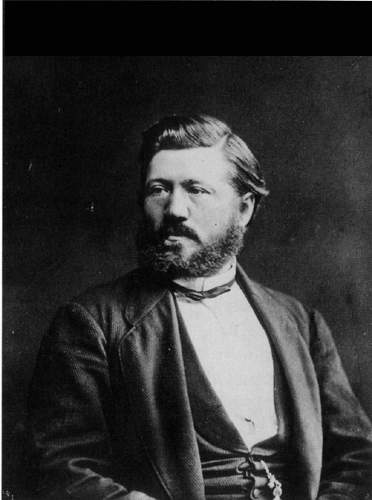
- Born: Hans Andreas Melhuus Gutzeit; April 29, 1836; Drammen, Norway
- Died: November 9, 1919 (aged 83); Oslo, Norway
- Occupations: Merchant, industrialist
- Known for: Founding W. Gutzeit & Co

Hans Andreas Melhuus Gutzeit (29 April 1836 – 9 November 1919) was a Norwegian merchant and industrialist. In 1872 he founded the sawmill company W. Gutzeit & Co in Kotka, Finland, and led it until 1879. The company eventually became the foundation of Enso-Gutzeit, which grew into Finland's largest forest industry company and is now part of Stora Enso.

== Biography ==
=== Background ===
Hans Gutzeit was born in Drammen, Norway, the son of the merchant Wilhelm Gutzeit and Dorothea Gurine Holst. Wilhelm Gutzeit ran a wholesale and timber export business, and in the late 1850s founded the firm W. Gutzeit & Co in Fredrikstad, together with his sons. Of Wilhelm Gutzeit's five children, four died of pulmonary tuberculosis. Hans escaped this fate by going to sea after school and qualifying as a ship's mate. When his father died in 1869, he became the sole heir to the firm.

Hans Gutzeit married Annette Olsen (1839–1922) in 1859, daughter of Erik Olsen, a bank director in Fredrikstad. The couple had seven children.

The firm had built the first steam-powered sawmill in Norway at Seiersborg in Trosvik, just west of Fredrikstad, as well as a planing mill in Glemmen, also near Fredrikstad. The sawmill began operating on 1 January 1860, the same day steam-powered sawmills became legally permitted in Norway, making it the first of its kind in the country.

=== Operations in Finland ===
After his father's death, Gutzeit came into contact with Lars Bredesen, a fellow Norwegian timber trader who had arrived in Finland in early 1870 and was brokering large quantities of logs to sawmill owners in the Kymi River basin in southern Finland. In February 1871, Bredesen concluded a pivotal agreement with the landowner Erik Cauton in Pieksämäki, by which Cauton undertook to deliver 1.1 million logs from the Kymi River basin within seven years. In March 1871, Bredesen transferred the agreement to Hans Gutzeit.

In April 1872, Gutzeit founded the company W. Gutzeit & Comp. in Christiania (present-day Oslo), with three Norwegian wholesale merchants and Bredesen as co-owners. Bredesen died before the company had begun operating. The same year, Gutzeit moved the firm to Kotka in Finland and brought in additional Norwegian investors to finance the sawmill venture. The company built a steam-powered sawmill in Kotka that was the largest in Finland at the time, with an annual capacity of 70,000 cubic metres. Local people called it "the Norwegian sawmill", as both the machinery and most of the workers came from Norway. Gutzeit ran the company from Kotka, and it was highly profitable in its early years.

From 1875, however, the market for sawn timber deteriorated and the company began operating at a loss. Gutzeit's personal finances were further strained by private business ventures in Finland that he had financed through loans from the company. By the end of 1879, his debts to the company had reached 184,000 Finnish marks, and his share in the company was not sufficient to cover the debt. That same year he resigned as managing director and relinquished his ownership stake. The sawmill was subsequently purchased by the firm Ludwigsen & Schelderup.

=== Later life ===
Gutzeit moved to Paris, where for some 30 years he sold timber as a commercial agent for W. Gutzeit & Co. and other Norwegian sawmill companies. In 1902 he returned to Norway and settled in Lysaker, outside Christiania.

=== Legacy ===
Despite Gutzeit's personal failure, W. Gutzeit & Co. continued its operations in Finland and grew into the country's largest forest industry company under the name Enso-Gutzeit. In 1996 the company adopted the simplified name Enso Oy, removing the founder's name from the corporate title after approximately 125 years. The company is now part of Stora Enso, one of the world's largest producers of paper, packaging and wood products.
