= Stora Enso =

Finnish and Swedish pulp and paper company

Stora Enso Oyj
- Type: Julkinen osakeyhtiö
- Traded as: Nasdaq Helsinki: STEAV, STERV; Nasdaq Stockholm: STE A, STE R
- ISIN: Helsinki: FI0009005953 and FI0009005961, Stockholm: FI0009007603 and FI0009007611
- Industry: Paper and packaging
- Predecessor: E. Holtzmann & Cie.
- Founded: 1998; 28 years ago (1288; 738 years ago)
- Headquarters: Helsinki, Finland
- Key people: Kari Jordan (chair of the board), Hans Sohlström (CEO)
- Products: Packaging materials, biomaterials, wooden construction and paper
- Revenue: ▲€9.326 billion (2025)
- Operating income: ▼€342 million (2023)
- Net income: ▼€-431 million (2023)
- Total assets: ▼€19,059 million (2025)
- Total equity: ▲€10,649 million (2025)
- Owners: Solidium, FAM AB and others
- Number of employees: ▼18,877 (2025)
- Website: www.storaenso.com

Stora Enso Oyj (from Swedish: Stora [ˈstǔːra] and Finnish: Enso [ˈenso]) is a Finnish and Swedish forest industry company. It develops and produces various materials, mostly based on wood, for a range of industries and applications worldwide.

In terms of total revenue, Stora Enso was the 9th largest company in Finland. Its headquarters are located in the four-storey wooden building Katajanokan Laituri in Katajanokka, Helsinki, Finland. Since 2023, Hans Sohlström has served as the CEO of the company.

The majority of sales takes place in Europe, but there are also significant operations in Asia and South America. Stora Enso was formed in 1998, when the Swedish mining and forestry products company Stora AB merged with the Finnish forestry products company Enso Oyj.

In 2023, there were 20,000 employees. In 2015, Stora Enso was ranked seventh in the world by sales and fourth by earnings, among forest, paper and packaging industry companies. For the first two quarters of 2018, the company was ranked second by net earnings among European forest and paper industry companies. The corporate history can be traced back to the oldest known preserved share certificate in the world, issued in 1288 by Stora Kopparberg. Based on this, some observers consider Stora Enso to be the oldest limited liability company in the world.

== History ==
Stora Enso was formed by the merger of Swedish mining and forestry products company Stora and Finnish forestry products company Enso Oyj in 1998.

=== History of Stora ===
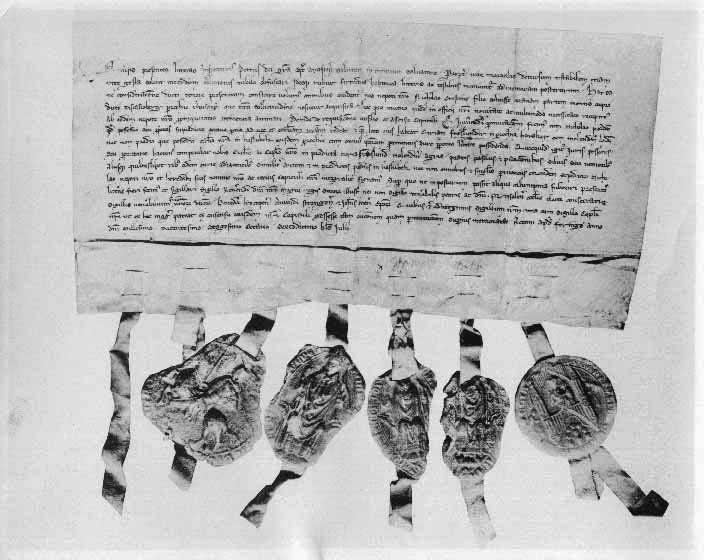
1/8 share of the Stora Kopparberg mine, dated 16 June 1288.

The oldest preserved share in the Swedish copper mining company Stora Kopparberg (Falun Mine) in Falun was issued in 1288. It granted the Bishop of Västerås 1/8th (12.5%) ownership, and it is also the oldest known preserved share in any company in the world. The corporate status of the company was further recognized in 1347, when King Magnus IV of Sweden granted it a charter. Some observers consider that these facts make Stora and its successor Stora Enso the oldest existing corporation or limited liability company in the world.

For some periods during the 17th century, the mine provided two thirds of the world production of copper. In the 18th century, the copper mining gradually decreased in importance, and therefore, in 1731, the company bought its first iron ore mine. By the 1860s, iron ore was economically more important to the company than copper.

Stora Kopparbergs Bergslags AB was incorporated as a modern shareholder company in 1862. Towards the end of the 19th century, it diversified from mining and entered pulp and paper production. In the 1970s, most of the mining and steel mill operations of the company were divested, and the focus changed to forestry-related activities. In 1984, the company name was shortened to Stora AB. The copper mine closed down in 1992.

In 1997, the year before the merger with Enso, Stora had 20,400 employees and a turnover of 44.5 billion SEK. The company owned 2.3 million hectares of forest of which 1.6 million hectares (an area larger than Connecticut) in Sweden and the rest in Canada, Portugal and Brazil. It also produced 7.5 TWh of mostly hydroelectric power. A 1997 article in Harvard Business Review praised Stora's ability to adapt to changing circumstances over the centuries. In 1998, the company merged with Enso to form Stora Enso.

=== History of Enso ===
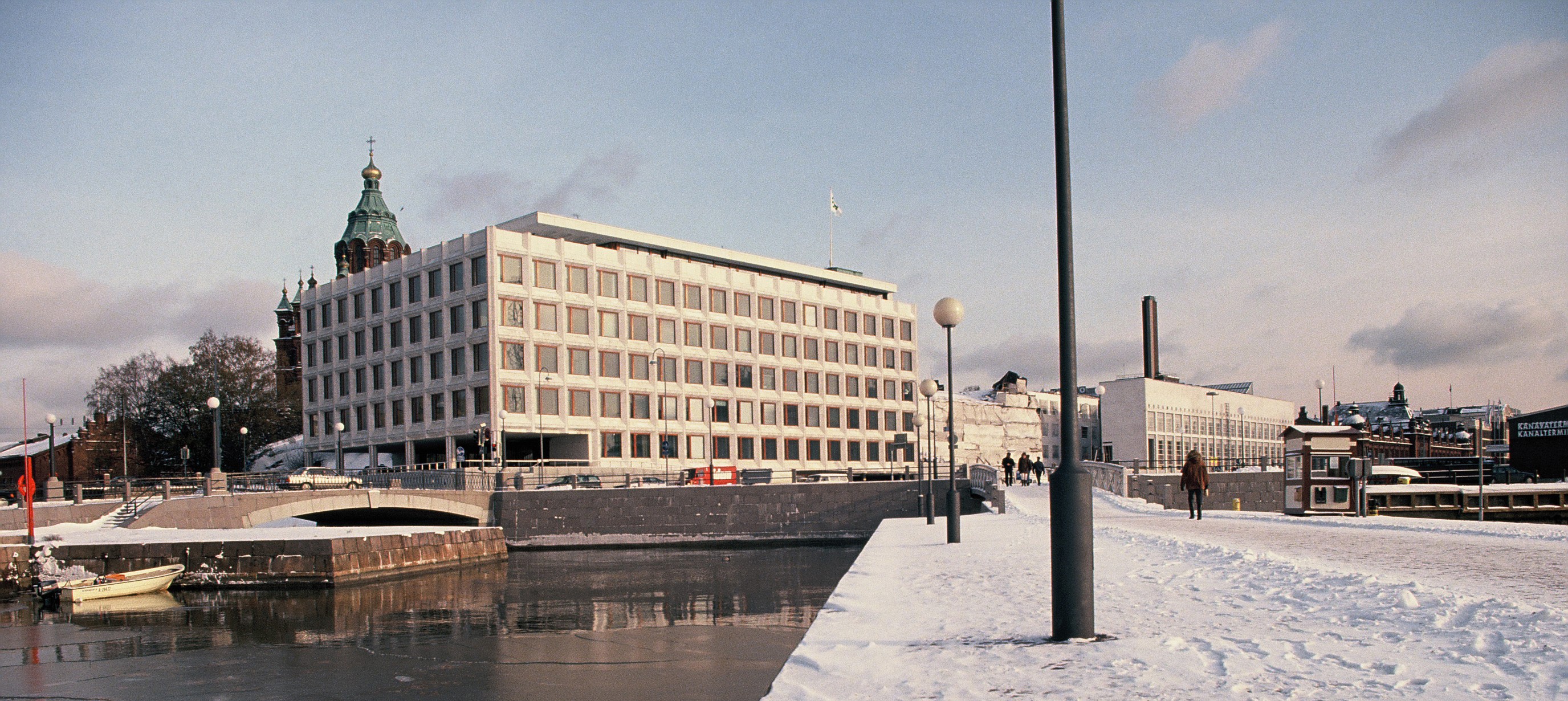
Headquarters built for Enso-Gutzeit Oy in the port area of Helsinki, designed by Alvar Aalto, 1962

==== 1850–1899 ====
The roots of Enso go back to the 1850s, when Wilhelm Gutzeit started Wilh. Gutzeit & Co. in Norway. He was a native of Königsberg who had moved to Norway to work as a secretary for his step-cousin Benjamin Wegner, an industrialist. Only one of Gutzeit's five children survived to adulthood and thus his son Hans Gutzeit started to work with him in the 1860s and inherited the company in 1869. In 1871, he started to operate in Finland, together with Lars J. Bredesen, who was from Norway too. Gutzeit started a sawmill in Kotka in November 1872 and called it W. Gutzeit & Comp. In 1897, the company became a Finnish company, and its name was changed to Aktiebolaget W. Gutzeit & Co.

==== 1900–1998 ====
As Gutzeit & Co bought Aktiebolaget Pankakoski in 1908 and Enso Träsliperi Ab in Jääski in 1911, the board production was added to company portfolio. In 1918, the company shares were bought by Finland which became independent in 1917, and Gutzeit became fully state owned company. In 1924, the company headquarters were moved from Kotka to Helsinki. The company's name was changed to Enso-Gutzeit Osakeyhtiö in 1928.

The company started to build Kaukopää mill in Imatra in 1935. At the time it was the biggest sulfate pulp mill in Europe. Summa paper mill in Hamina was taken into use in 1955. The company's name was changed to Enso-Gutzeit Oy in 1981. Enso-Gutzeit bought A. Ahlström Osakeyhtiö's forest industries at Varkaus in 1987. In 1993, the company bought units from Tampella, Tampella Forest Oy and Tambox Europe's units from Finland and Sweden. In 1996, two state owned forest companies were merged and Enso-Gutzeit Oy and Veitsiluoto Oy from North Finland became Enso Oyj. In 1997, it acquired a majority stake in the German forestry company E. Holtzmann & Cie. In 1998, the company merged with Stora to form Stora Enso.

=== History of Stora Enso ===
==== 1998–2009 ====
After the merger, Stora Enso expanded its operations by acquiring wood products businesses and bought paper merchant businesses in Europe. In 2000, the company bought Consolidated Papers in North America. Stora Enso also slowly expanded its operations in South America, Asia and Russia. In 2000, Stora Enso acquired the North American pulp and paper manufacturer Consolidated Papers for EUR 4.9 billion. The acquisition has, in hindsight, been noted in the financial press as a massive value destroyer. In the same year, Stora Enso and AssiDomän formed a joint company, Billerud AB, to produce packaging paper.

In 2002, Stora Enso started investigating the possibility of establishing plantations and production facilities in Guangxi, China. In recent years, the company has gone through heavy restructuring. The North American operations were divested in 2007 to NewPage Corporation. Stora Enso has sold and closed down some of its mills in Finland, Sweden and Germany. The closure of a plant in Kemijärvi in 2008 and subsequent events were subject to significant Finnish media coverage. In 2009, Stora Enso entered into a joint venture in Uruguay, called Montes del Plata, with access to 250,000 hectares of woodland and the intention to build a large-capacity mill.

==== 2010–2019 ====
In 2010, Stora Enso acquired a 30 per cent stake in the Chinese printed paper packaging manufacturer Inpac. In September 2012, Stora Enso signed an agreement with Packages Ltd., the largest packaging company of Pakistan, to set up a joint venture named Bulleh Shah Packaging (Pvt.) Ltd. at Kasur, Pakistan. The ownership stake for Stora Enso was 35 per cent. In 2017, the stake was sold back to Packages Ltd., at a loss of EUR 19 million.

Between 2006 and 2014, the share of paper products of the total sales decreased from 62 per cent to 38 per cent, while packaging and wood products increased their shares of the revenue, as the company, according to Bloomberg News, was "betting on renewable packaging as online shopping grows." In 2015, the Financial Times and Bloomberg News reported that Stora Enso was investing in biomaterials and renewable construction products as possible future growth areas.

By 2016 Stora Enso owned 90 per cent of Inpac. In July 2017, the Financial Times reiterated that a focus on renewable packaging, biomaterials and construction products formed part of the strategic direction of Stora Enso, while also reporting that the revenue from paper had decreased further to 30 per cent of the total sales. It also reported that the current and foreseeable market conditions were such that forestry industry companies in general received and could be expected to receive comparatively low shares of their profits from paper production.

In 2018, Stora Enso, along with 23 other Finnish and Swedish companies, formed a joint venture named Combient for research and knowledge sharing in the areas of artificial intelligence, deep learning, big data and automation.

Examples of notable products launched in 2017–2019 were

- cardboard-based packaging under the name EcoFishBox as an alternative to polystyrene boxes for transportation of fresh fish,
- industrial-scale supply of lignin under the name Lineo as an alternative to phenol-based adhesives,
- prototypes of biodegradable drinking straws, DuraSense biocomposites which enable the use of renewable wood-based fibres which can be used as substitutes for fossil-based plastic, and
- a new retail solution which merges in-store and online shopping through RFID-enabled e-kiosks. The service is offered in co-operation with Atos.

==== 2020–present ====
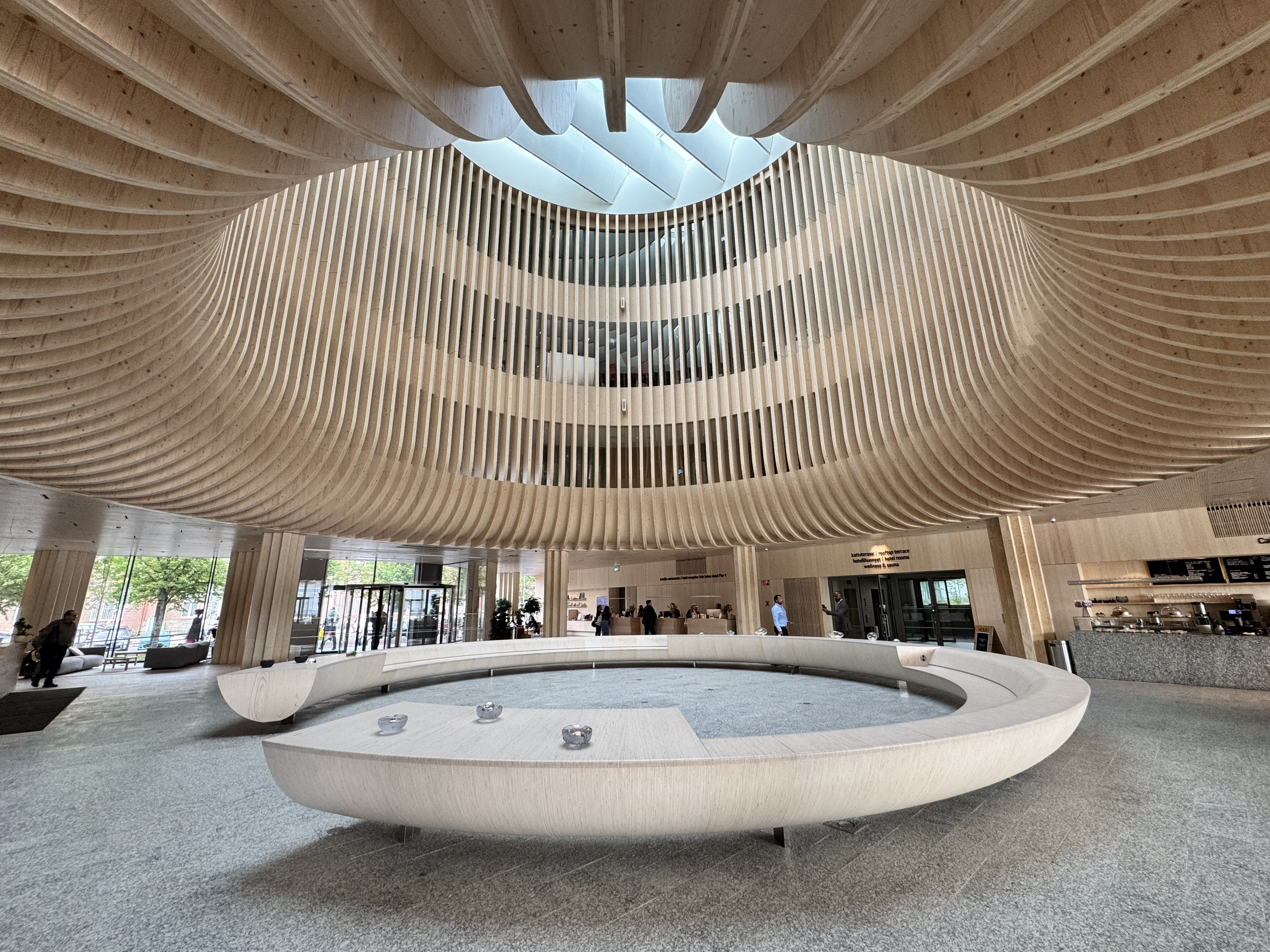
The Katajanokan Laituri building in Katajanokka, Helsinki, Finland was completed in 2024 and hosts the current head office of Stora Enso.

In the beginning of 2020, Stora Enso started a new division called Forest. It included

- Stora Enso's forest assets in Sweden
- the 41% share of Tornator with the majority of its forest assets located in Finland
- wood supply operations in Finland, Sweden, Russia and the Baltic countries.

In July 2021, Stora Enso informed that it was selling its RFID tag technology called ECO to Grupo CCRR.

In March 2022, Stora Enso announced its intention to sell four paper mills located in Anjala in Finland, Hylte and Nymölla in Sweden and Maxau in Germany. If no buyer could be found, the company would continue to run the mills.

== Market ==
=== Products and services by division ===
In 2021, Stora Enso offer products and services through six corporate divisions.

- The Biomaterials division sells pulp, as well as additional products that can be extracted biochemically from wood and other sorts of biomass.
- The Packaging materials division sells varieties of paperboard for packaging of dry and liquid products, including food, as well as for graphic printing purposes.
- The Forest division has wood supply operations in Finland, Sweden, Russia and the Baltic countries.
- The Packaging solutions division sells corrugated fiberboard, other types of paperboard used in production of packaging containers, as well as complete packaging boxes and equipment and services related to packaging production.
- The Paper division sells paper for commercial printing and office use, as well as services for the printing industry, such as paper supply management.
- The Wood products division sells construction materials that have been produced using wood as a raw material.

In 2021, the sales figures and relative contributions to group earnings by divisions were:

Sales by division 2021, million EUR	External	Internal	Total
Packaging materials	3,715	183	3,898
Packaging solutions	704	19	723
Biomaterials	1,499	229	1,728
Wood products	1,766	106	1,872
Forest	781	1,530	2,311
Paper	1,644	59	1,703
Other	55	1,037	1,092

== Operations ==
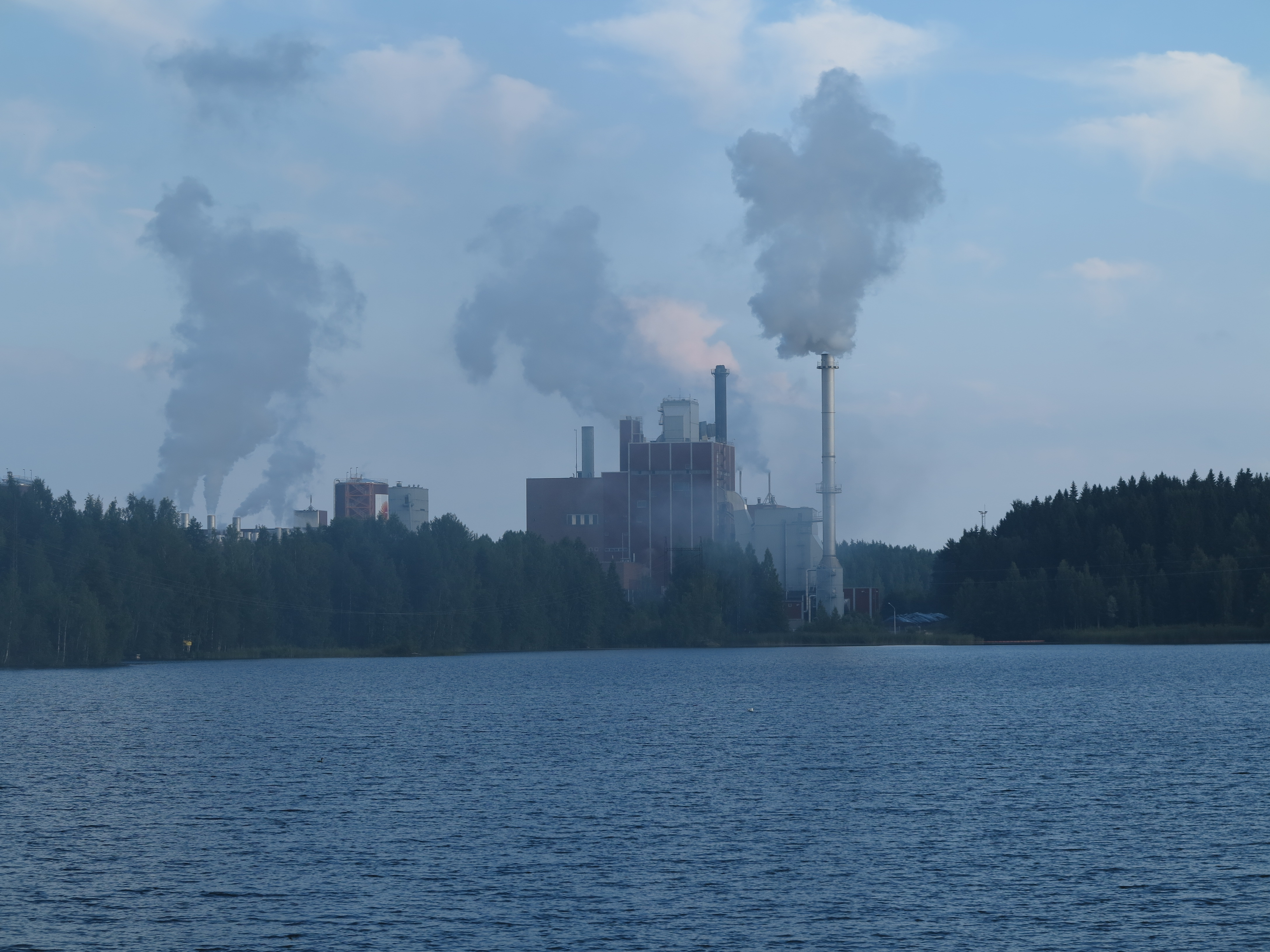
A fluting factory of Stora Enso in Heinola, Finland

Stora Enso has the majority of its operations in Europe.

In 2021

- 26% of the personnel worked in Finland,
- 22% in Sweden,
- 13% in China,
- 9% in Poland,
- 5% in Czech Republic,
- 5% in Russia and
- 4% in Austria.
- 13% of the employees worked in other European countries (for example in Baltic states, Belgium, France, Germany and Spain), 3% in Brazil and Uruguay, and 1% in other countries.

=== Headquarters ===
The first Stora Enso headquarters in Helsinki was designed by Alvar Aalto as the head office of Enso-Gutzeit Oy. The building was taken into use in 1961. In 2008, Stora Enso sold the building to the German property company Deka Immobilien GmbH for €30 million and started renting the building, while also declaring its intention to move to other rented premises in the Helsinki area.

In December 2021, it was announced that the construction of Stora Enso's new headquarters in Katajanokka had started. Other office space and a hotel were also planned for the building, which is owned by the occupational pension company Varma. The building was due to be completed in spring 2024. Stora Enso moved to a temporary headquarters in a property owned by Varma in Salmisaari.

=== Joint ventures ===
Veracel is a joint venture between Stora Enso (50 percent ownership) and Suzano Papel e Celulose in Brazil.

In Uruguay, Stora Enso (50 percent ownership) and Celulosa Arauco y Constitución operate the Montes del Plata joint venture at Conchillas.

== Governance ==
=== Key people ===
Hans Sohlström, CEO

Previous CEOs were

- Annica Bresky (from 2019 to 2023)
- Karl-Henrik Sundström (from 2014 to 2019)
- Jouko Karvinen (from 2007 to 2014) and
- Jukka Härmälä (from the creation of Stora Enso in 1998 to 2007).

The board of directors in 2024: Kari Jordan (chair of board), Håkan Buskhe (vice chair of the board), Elisabeth Fleuriot, Helena Hedblom, Astrid Hermann, Christiane Kuehne, Richard Nilsson, and Reima Rytsölä.

=== Ownership ===
In May 2024, the Finnish state was, through the state-owned Solidium fund and Social Insurance Institution of Finland, the largest owner by number of shares, while the Wallenberg family foundations, through FAM AB, was the second largest. These two owners were also the largest ones by number of votes.

The five biggest owners on 31 May 2024 were:

1. Solidium Oy
2. FAM AB
3. Social Insurance Institution of Finland (KELA)
4. Ilmarinen Mutual Pension Insurance Company
5. Varma Mutual Pension Insurance Company

=== Language ===
Following the merger, English became the lingua franca of the company. A study of the implications of this for the effectiveness of Stora Enso's internal business communication, published in the academic journal Business Communication Quarterly, concluded that the analyzed communication "seemed to work well".

== Controversies ==
=== Cartel ===
Metsä Group and Stora Enso were fined €500,000 for forming a cartel in 2001.

=== Accusations of wrongful accounting ===
The North American part of the group was sold in 2007 to NewPage Corporation with a net loss of about 4.12 billion dollars. According to a Swedish television documentary, there have been accusations that to cover the loss, the accounting was manipulated, which was revealed in 2010. The documentary also claims that huge dividend payments were made illegally and top management was aware of that fact and on purpose manipulated numbers to be able to pay dividends.

Gerard Goodwyn, the company's head of accounting who spoke publicly about the accounting mistake, was fired in 2010.

In 2013, Stora Enso published a report written by independent law firms, which the company had commissioned to investigate the accusations. According to the report, the investigations performed did not find any evidence of illegal acts or wrongful financial reporting, apart from mistakes that had already been communicated and corrected by 2009. The findings of the investigations were also reported to the Finnish Financial Supervisory Authority, which found no reason to take further action. In articles commenting on the report, the Finnish newspaper Helsingin Sanomat stated that they had been contacted by the source of the accusations in 2010 but that, after attempting to confirm the accusations, they had not considered that there were sufficient grounds for a news story.

=== Environmental concerns ===
Eucalyptus cultivation by Stora Enso has been discussed critically, especially in relation to the 2011 documentary film Red Forest Hotel.

Nova Scotia Forest Industries, the Canadian corporate identity of Stora Forest Industries (as it was known in the day) in 1983 was pursued in the Nova Scotia Supreme Court in Palmer v Nova Scotia Forest Industries and did emerge victorious. The case went on to influence the practice of Canadian environmental law. What neighbours objected to was the spraying of the herbicide 2,4,5-trichlorophenoxyacetic acid, a component of Agent Orange.

=== Human rights concerns ===
The Swedish program Kalla fakta reported in 2014 that Stora Enso used child labor in its activities in Pakistan, and that the company had been aware of it since 2012. In response, the company denied that child labor existed directly in the operations of its joint venture partner in Pakistan, but admitted that it was present in its supplier networks. It stated that its partner, Bulleh Shah Packaging, was taking short-term action to remedy the situation in areas where child labor was known to exist, and was also working to mitigate child labor in the long term by addressing its root causes. In 2017, Stora Enso divested its business interest in Pakistan.

=== Legionella infection ===
In 2019, at least 32 people got infected and two people died due to legionnaires' disease after being infected by steam coming from a Legionella pneumophila contaminated cooling tower of the Stora Enso factory located in Ghent, Belgium. The cooling tower had an aerobic count of over 1,000,000, about ten times the urgent action limit of 100,000 micro-organisms per mL at 30 °C

=== Pearl mussel catastrophe ===
In August 2024, logging machines belonging to Stora Enso drove over a critical habitat for freshwater pearl mussels, protected by Finnish environmental laws, at Hukkajoki River in Suomussalmi, Finland. Thousands of these extremely endangered animals were wiped in the river crossing point and downstream. The Police is investigating the case as a severe environmental crime, and the Finnish Minister of Climate and the Environment Kai Mykkänen demanded Stora Enso to take full responsibility and to cover the caused damage and the whole Finnish forest industry to act more to protect the environment.

== Corporate responsibility ==
In July 2014, Stora Enso started to collaborate with Save the Children around children's rights. The collaboration concerned policies and processes with regard to supply chain issues in Pakistan.

In April 2015, Stora Enso entered into a partnership with ILO, with the aims of progressively eliminating child labor from the supply chain in Pakistan and promoting decent work conditions. The experiences in Pakistan prompted Stora Enso to appoint an executive vice president for sustainability to its group leadership team, and to include sustainability managers in its division leadership teams.

In 2016, Stora Enso qualified for inclusion on the "Climate A list" of the CDP environmental organization, a status awarded to 193 of 1,839 companies sampled.

Stora Enso was the main sponsor of the FIS Nordic World Ski Championships 2017 in Lahti. The company provided the games with items made of renewable materials, including two spectator shelters built from cross laminated timber elements, which were subsequently donated to the host city.

== See also ==
- William Lehtinen, Enso-Gutzeit's post-war rebuilder and CEO
- Great Copper Mountain
- Ahlstrom
- Enso (town)
- List of Finnish companies
- List of oldest companies
- Svenska Cellulosa Aktiebolaget
- UPM-Kymmene
