= Marketta Kokkonen =

Finnish politician (born 1946)

Aira Marketta Kokkonen (born 1946) was City Manager/Mayor of Espoo, the second largest city in Finland, from 1995 to 2010.
