= Enso headquarters =

Office building in Helsinki, Finland, designed by Alvar Aalto

Stora Enso headquarters
- Stora Enson pääkonttori
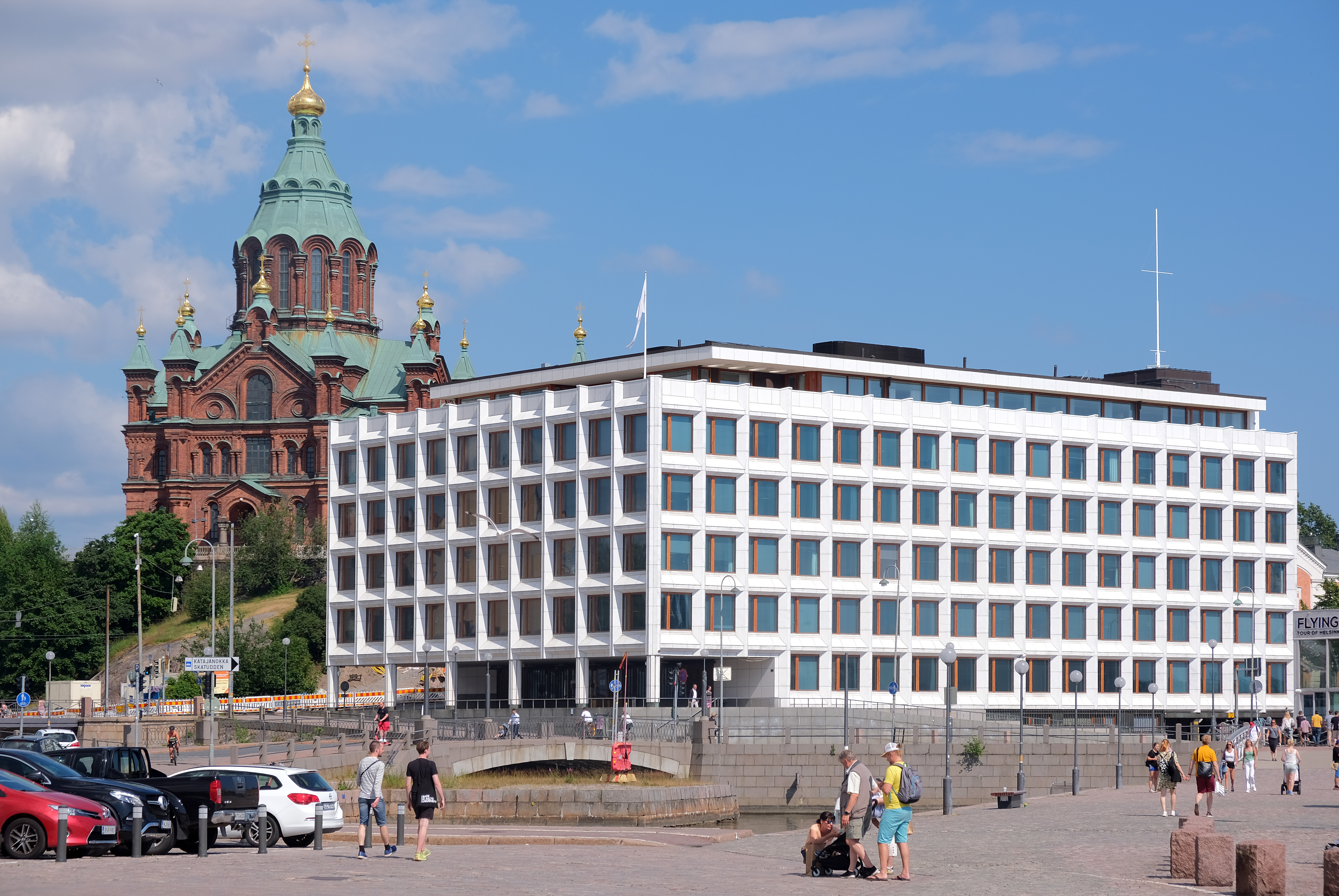
- Stora Enso headquarters pictured in 2021, with Uspenski Cathedral seen in the background
- Interactive map of the Stora Enso headquarters area
- Former names: Enso-Gutzeitin pääkonttori
- Alternative names: 'Sugar Cube' (Sokeripala)

General information
- Type: Corporate
- Architectural style: Modernism
- Location: Helsinki, Finland
- Coordinates: 60.167917°N 24.958444°E
- Current tenants: Stora Enso Oyj
- Completed: 1962
- Owner: Deka Immobilien GmbH

Technical details
- Floor area: 12,000 square metres (130,000 sq ft)

Design and construction
- Architect: Alvar Aalto

The Stora Enso headquarters is an office building located in the Katajanokka neighbourhood of central Helsinki, Finland, completed in 1962. It is notable for having been designed by the Finnish architect Alvar Aalto.

== Architecture ==
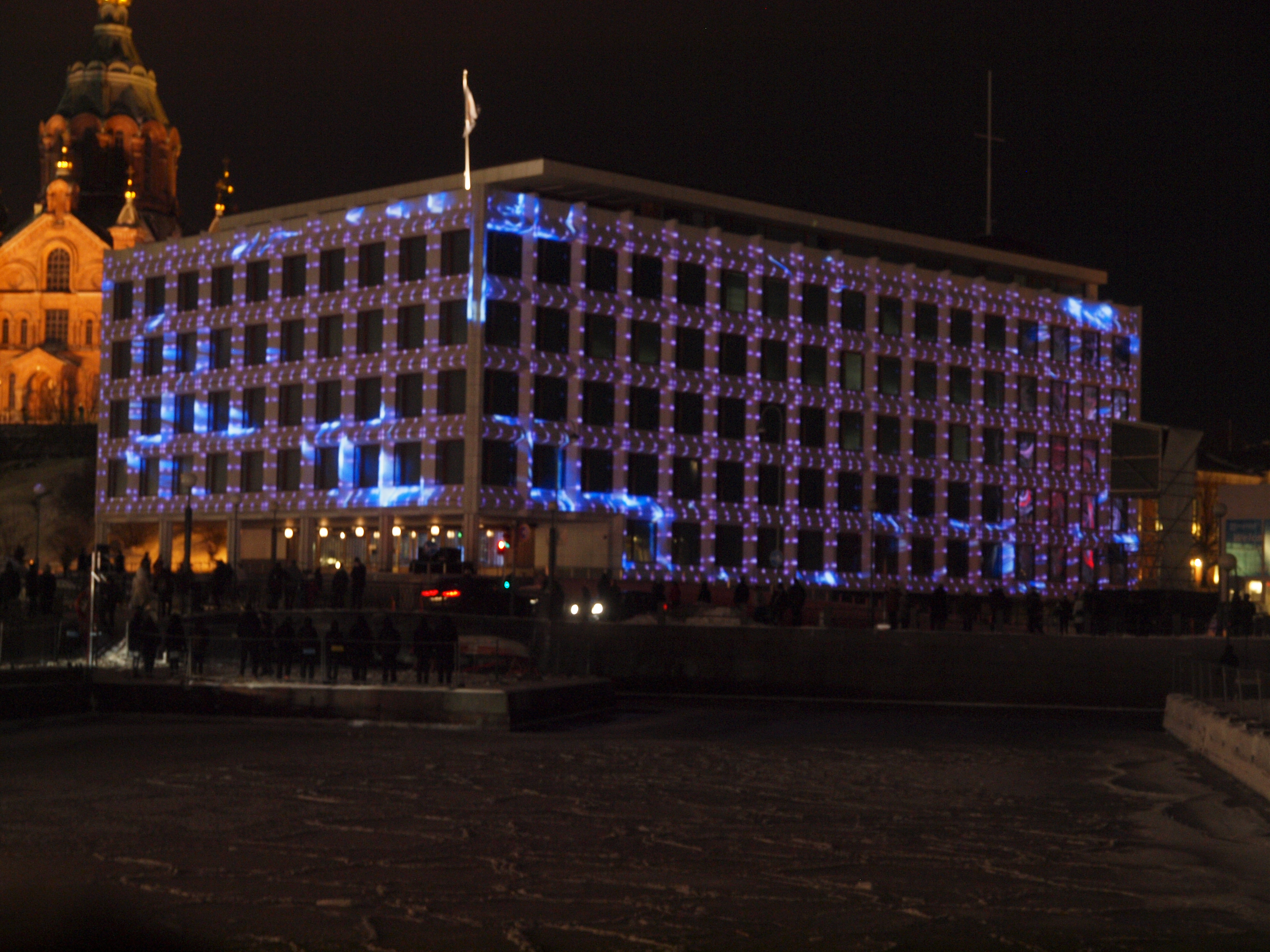
The Stora Enso headquarters illuminated at Lux Helsinki 2017. The patterns in the lighting conform to the building's rectangular design.

Aalto's design is outwardly simple — essentially a white, monolithic block. However, the design and proportions are carefully considered, and the building makes use of premium exterior materials such as Carrara marble, granite, copper and brass, as well as lavish interior design features.

The building is commonly referred to as the "Sugar Cube" (Finnish: Sokeripala), due to its shape and colour.

There are six storeys above ground, with the top floor being slightly recessed to form a roof terrace overlooking the harbour and market square. There are also two underground levels, one of which is used for car parking. The total floor area is c. 12,000 square metres (130,000 sq ft). Many of the internal walls are movable, allowing the layout to be reconfigured should the tenant's spatial needs change.

== Controversy ==
The building is located in a prominent position by the city's central South Harbour (Finnish: Eteläsatama) and Market Square, adjacent to the Presidential Palace. It is considered by some an eyesore for the way it seems to clash with the neoclassical architecture of its immediate surroundings and the Uspenski Cathedral, and is regarded as one of the most controversial of Aalto's designs. It has at times been called "the ugliest building in Finland", the "most hated building" and "completely misplaced". Also construction of the building originally required the demolition of the palace-like Norrmén house designed by Theodor Höijer, which was criticised right from the start.

In 2010, after many years of legal and political wrangling, the building was granted protected status, as originally proposed by Docomomo, on the basis of its architectural merits and the significance of Aalto's heritage. This means that the exterior appearance cannot be changed, and any refurbishment etc. works must use the same materials as the original design. The protection also extends to certain interior spaces, such as the entrance lobby, managing director's suite and boardroom.

== Ownership and tenancy ==
The building was designed to serve as the head office of the then Enso-Gutzeit company, the current incarnation of which is Stora Enso. The building is still known to some as the "Enso Headquarters" or "Enso-Gutzeit headquarters".

In 2008, Stora Enso sold the building to the German property investment company Deka for approximately EUR 30 million, and has since leased back the property.

In 2019, it was announced that Stora Enso would be vacating the building and moving to a new headquarters to be built on an adjacent plot as part of a wider redevelopment of the Katajanokka quay, and due to be completed in 2023. Following an architectural contest, in June 2020, the design proposal "Spring" was announced as the winner.
