= Salmisaari =

Neighborhood of Helsinki, Finland

Coordinates: 60°9′53.23″N 24°54′17.6″E

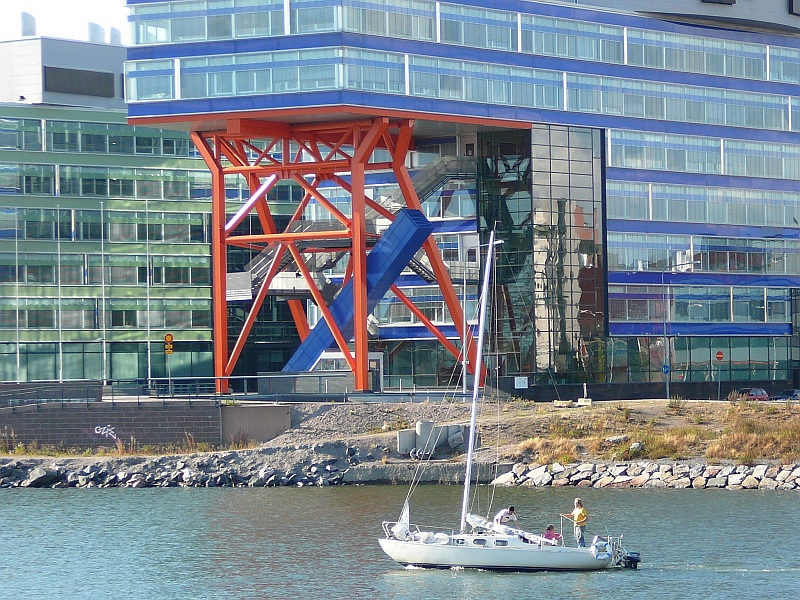
Office buildings on the Tammasaari pier on the shore of Ruoholahti.

Salmisaari (Swedish: Sundholmen) is a small area (a sector, pienalue) belonging to the Ruoholahti quarter of the Länsisatama neighbourhood of Helsinki, Finland.

The Salmisaari island was previously located west of the Helsinginniemi peninsula. However, during the early times of Länsisatama, it was annexed to the mainland by filling the sea in between. The area of Salmisaari has been named after this island.

Since 1953, Salmisaari has included the Salmisaari power plant, owned by Helsingin Energia. It also has offices of Altia (Salmisaarenranta 7). The opposite half of the same building acts as the Helsinki Court House.

== Renovation ==
On the site of Salmisaari's former power plant's coal supply area, in the immediate vicinity of the Länsiväylä highway, there will be completed in autumn 2008 100,000 square metres of high-level office and business premises and an exercise building of 20,000 square metres, containing two ice hockey halls. The central location, diverse services and good traffic connections make Salmisaari a unique target. The new office building has been planned in respect of the old buildings, and Salmisaari is planned to have a stylish and comfortable city district with its own marina and beach boulevard. Tenants include the insurance company Varma, Ahlstrom, Sponda, YIT, Omenahotelli, Regus, and Technopolis.
