= Varma Mutual Pension Insurance Company =

Finnish pension insurance company

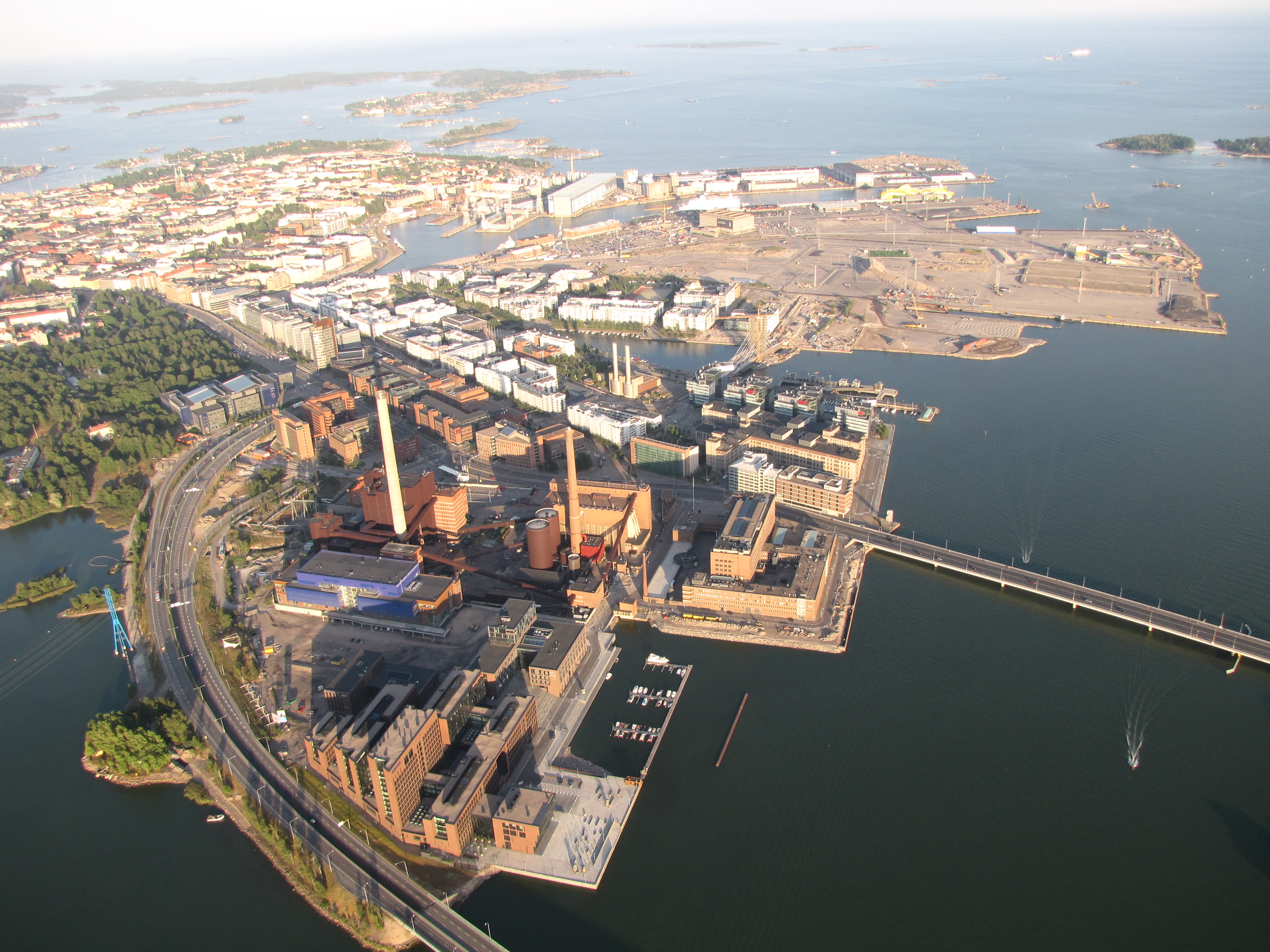
- Ruoholahti from a hot air balloon in 2010. Varma's main office in Salmisaari is in the foreground.
- Company type: Mutual company
- Industry: Insurance services
- Founded: 1998
- Headquarters: Helsinki, Finland
- Key people: Risto Murto (CEO), Jaakko Eskola (Chairman of the Board)
- Revenue: €10,485.6 million (2021)
- Operating income: €5,586.5 million (2021)
- Net income: €6.8 million (2021)
- Total assets: €45,962.0 million (2021)
- Number of employees: 527 (2021)
- Website: https://www.varma.fi/en/

Varma Pension Insurance Company (Finnish: Keskinäinen työeläkevakuutusyhtiö Varma) is a pension insurance company in Finland. Varma manages statutory TyEL insurance for employees and YEL insurance for the self-employed and statutory vocational rehabilitation and services relating to predicting and managing work ability risks. Varma is a mutual company and its head office is located in Salmisaari, Helsinki.

In 2021, Varma paid out pensions in the amount of 6.2 billion euros to 346,000 people, and at year-end 571,229 people were insured with Varma. In terms of turnover, Varma was the twelfth-biggest company in Finland in 2020. In 2021, Varma was one of the largest real estate investors in Finland.
