= Finnpap =

Finnish paper industry organisation (1918–1996)

- Type: Osakeyhtiö
- Industry: Paper industry sales
- Founded: 1918
- Defunct: 1996
- Fate: Discontinued
- Headquarters: Helsinki, Finland
- Products: Paper, newsprint, Kraft paper

Finnpap, or the Finnish Paper Mills' Association (Finnish: Suomen Paperitehtaitten Yhdistys, Swedish: Finlands papperbruksförening), was a joint export and sales body for the Finnish paper industry from 1918 to 1996, after which the system was discontinued when EU competition rules came into effect.

The organization was originally formed to conquer new markets, when the Russian market was lost after the Bolshevik Revolution in 1917. For decades, Finnpap was the world's largest paper exporter. In the mid-1970s, the association employed around 500 Finns and 400 non-Finns. Around this time, its share of Finland's total exports was 18.5 percent and of world paper exports 16 percent.

== History ==
Finnpap was founded in 1918 on the initiative of Gösta Serlachius and Rudolf Walden. After World War I the traditionell markets in Germany and Russia were in disarray. The association was founded to support the opening of new export markets among Western countries, but for almost its entire existence it also took care of the domestic paper sales of its member companies. Initially, all 23 paper mills in operation at the time joined. The idea for a joint sales organization came from German paper manufacturers, who at that time had begun to concentrate their own marketing efforts in joint sales associations.

The company Kymmene Ab left the association in its early years, and the company's relationship with the association later became the most problematic of all the companies. In 1921, a separate Finnish paper agency was founded alongside the Finnish Paper Mills' Association to handle paper sales to the Soviet Union, the Baltic States and Poland. The reason for this was that Kymmene wanted to continue sales cooperation only in these countries and not in others. In 1946, after the war was over, Kymmene returned to the Finnish Paper Mills' Association and at the same time the company was made the association's domestic sales department. Kymmene wanted to leave Finnpap again in 1976, but had to change their decision. At last, Kymmene left Finnpap in 1990.

Newsprint sales were concentrated in the association's first department, which usually accounted for about a third of the association's total sales between the world wars. The second department's main product was kraft paper, but it also sold many other types of paper.

=== World War II and the years after ===
During World War II, the Finnish Paper Mills' Association initially tried to maintain its trade relations with Great Britain, the USA and South America, but all these relations were broken in 1941 when Finland allied itself with Germany. In 1943, the Nordic paper producers established a cooperation committee to plan post-war transactions, which the Finnish Paper Mills' Association also joined. From 1945 to 1950, Finnish paper was mainly exported only to the Soviet Union, until exports almost completely ceased due to poor price offers. At the same time, trade relations with Western countries recovered rapidly after the war, allowing the Finnish market to increase its production to new peak figures.

The overlapping agency agreements in the main markets were made clearer so that the agencies in the UK were formed into a joint company, Lamco, and in the USA, newsprint brokerage was transferred to the merged Madden, Reeve, Angel & Co., while Jay Madden Company continued as a distributor of other qualities of paper.

In South America, Compañia de Papel de Diario Finlandes was founded for newsprints, and for other papers, a joint Kartopapel sales company was established together with Finnboard (Suomen Kartonkiyhdistys), a Finnish association in the cardboard industry. In Argentina, Finnish paper was also sold by Eino Heinonen, who competed with the Finnish Paper Mills' Association. In the growing Brazilian market, sales were concentrated in a Finnish company called Samab. In France, the company Finapar was founded to sell Finnish paper, in the Netherlands Finpag, in Italy Fincartiere, in Spain Finpapel, in Germany Finnpapier, in South Africa Finn-Mills. The management of these companies was increasingly taken over by Finns.

=== Company growth ===
After the war, Finnpap's most important leaders were the father and son duo, Holger and Thomas Nystén. Holger Nystén (1905–1964) built Finnpap into an organization with several hundred employees in the 1950s and took a strong position for Finland's associate membership in EFTA, which was achieved through the Finefta agreement in 1961. Thomas Nystén (1939–2011) led an operation in the mid-1970s in which Finnish paper mills refused to sell newsprint to the United States at a loss, despite supply agreements, due to the weakening dollar exchange rate. About ten years later, Thomas Nystén caused the association large currency losses with his dollar speculation, but he was allowed to continue in his position.

In the 1950s, the Finnish Paper Mills' Association gained new members, including the state-owned paper mills Veitsiluoto and Wilh. Schauman.

From the mid-1960s, due to increased sales, Finnpap began to abandon the use of agencies in export countries and establish more of its own sales offices in addition to the offices in Stockholm and Buenos Aires that had already been established in the 1940s. While only 7 percent of exports in 1965 went through its own sales offices, by 1979 the share had already reached 78 percent.

In connection with the organizational reform in 1974, the association's official name was changed to the Finnish Paper Mills' Association – Finnpap. Even before that, the association's telegram address had been the one-letter form finpap, which was also pronounced with a short i to distinguish it from the Swedish word finpapper.

In January 1977, the joint sales associations of the Finnish forest industry, Finnpap, Finnboard (Suomen Kartonkiyhdistys), Finncell (Suomen celluloosayhdistys) and Converta (Suomen Paperinja Kartonginjalostajien Yhdistys) started a joint shipping company, Transfennica, with the aim of collecting all export deliveries from the Finnish forest industry into a single unit.

=== The last years ===
From the 1980s onwards, the attitude towards cartels within different industries and other restrictions on competition between companies in the same sector became stricter, and finally, after Finland joined the European Union, Finnpap and other similar sales associations had to be dissolved. The state-owned company Enso was separated from Finnpap in the late 1980s, and Kymmene withdrew in 1990 after purchasing the French paper company Chapelle Darblay and to satisfy cartel suspicions from EU authorities. After this, the remaining members in Finnpap were Repola, Metsä Board, Veitsiluoto, Myllykoski, Tampella, Nokian Paperi and Kyro. When the forest industry was reorganized in 1996, Finnpap merged with Kymmene and the board sales association Finnboard merged with Metsä-Serla.

== Public relations ==
At its peak, Finnpap was the world's largest single paper seller and the association maintained good relations with major international customers. For example, newspaper mogul Robert Maxwell's visit to Finland in May 1988 was described by Helsingin Sanomat as almost comparable to a state visit. Maxwell was awarded the Commander of the Order of the White Rose, 1st Class, the same as Rupert Murdoch during his visit three years earlier. On the roads between Helsinki and the paper mill towns, Finnpap's large black American cars were often seen transporting guests. Finnpap's marketing communications included Lenita Airisto's shows, such as Success Story Finland and the Paper Doll Show, specially commissioned by Finnpap in 1989. Finnpap published the customer magazine Finnpap Bulletin from 1966 to 1980, the magazine Finnpap Express from 1981 to 1983 and the magazine Finnpap World from 1984 to 1995.

== Critique ==
In addition to its cartel-like operations, Finnpap was criticized as a bureaucratic and slow organization with complex administrative structures, as well as a workplace that offered better career opportunities for men than for women. It was also ridiculed as a sheltered workplace for heirs to wealthy Swedish-speaking families, but the association believed that the tradition had arisen from the fact that Finland Swedes were originally better qualified for jobs in export marketing.

== Executives ==
=== CEO ===
- Hjalmar Grönvik, 1918-1923
- Rafael von Frenckell, 1923–1931
- Hjalmar J. Procopé, 1931–1939
- Holger Nystén, 1939-1964
- Jorma Keino, 1973–1983
- Thomas Nystén, 1984–1994
- Berndt Brunow, 1994–1996
- Pentti Kallio, 1996

=== Chairman of the Supervisory Board ===
- Rudolf Walden, 1918–1940
- Rafael von Frenckell, 1941–1953
- R. Erik Serlachius, 1954–1965
- Juuso Walden, 1966–1969
- Bengt G. Rehbinder, 1970–1973
- Kurt Swanljung, 1974–1975
- Lars Mikander, 1976–1977
- Nils Gustav Grotenfelt, 1978–1982
- Juhani Ahava, 1983–1986

=== Chairman of the Executive Board ===
- Holger Nystén, 1946–1964
- Holger Sumelius, 1964–1966
- Åke Fröjdman, 1967–1968
- Nils Gustav Grotenfelt, 1966–1972
- Jorma Keino, 1973–1987
- Thomas Nystén, 1987–1994
- Berndt Brunow, 1994–1995

=== Board chairman ===
- Juhani Ahava, 1987–1990
- Olli Parola, 1991–1995
- Juha Niemelä, 1996

== See also ==
- Yhtyneet Paperitehtaat
