= Carl Gustaf Björnberg =

Finnish business executive (1901–1995)

- Born: 24 June 1901; Helsinki, Grand Duchy of Finland
- Died: 8 December 1995 (aged 94); Helsinki, Finland
- Occupation: Business executive
- Known for: CEO of Myllykoski paper mill 1951–1978
- Spouse: Ingrid Margareta Aminoff (m. 1934)
- Children: Fredrik Björnberg; Carl G. Björnberg; Hans J. Björnberg

Carl Gustaf Björnberg (24 June 1901 – 8 December 1995) was a Finnish business executive who served as CEO of Myllykoski paper mill from 1951 to 1978. Under his leadership, Myllykoski became a world leader in the production of SC paper for magazines.

== Biography ==
=== Early life and career ===
Carl Gustaf Björnberg was born in Helsinki in 1901, the only son of Fredrik Björnberg, a colonel, provincial governor and adjoint to the Minister State Secretary, and Maria Charlotta (Lilly) Sanmark. His uncle Claes Björnberg had founded the Myllykoski groundwood pulp mill, but withdrew from business after 1920. Following Fredrik Björnberg's death in 1924, the 24-year-old Carl Gustaf was elected to the board of Yhtyneet Paperitehtaat (United Paper Mills). He had passed his matriculation examination in 1920 and his higher law examination in 1925.

As a 16-year-old, Björnberg had participated in the Finnish Civil War, and later served in both the Winter War and the Continuation War. Veterans' and war invalids' organisations were therefore close to his heart throughout his life.

=== Yhtyneet Paperitehtaat ===
Björnberg became vice chairman of Yhtyneet Paperitehtaat, where the chairman and CEO was General Rudolf Walden, who dominated the company he had founded. Björnberg paid particular attention to the development of the Myllykoski mill, which had joined Yhtyneet Paperitehtaat in 1920. Renewal at Myllykoski began in the latter half of the 1920s with the construction of a hydroelectric power station and a groundwood mill. In the depths of the Depression in 1932, construction began on a newsprint factory, which was ready for operation the following year.

Power supply was also within Björnberg's area of responsibility. He initiated a survey of hydroelectric resources in Lapland and took the initiative for the founding of the joint power company Pohjolan Voima Oy in 1943.

When General Walden stepped down as chairman in 1945, a year before his death, Björnberg succeeded him. However, his chairmanship was marked by growing disagreements between the two main owning families over the direction and timing of investments. In 1940 Walden's son Juuso Walden had been appointed CEO, and tensions between the families escalated over the following decade.

=== Myllykoski Paper Mill ===
In 1951 an exceptional solution was reached: the Myllykoski mill, its associated power stations, and shares in the Sunila cellulose factory were separated from Yhtyneet Paperitehtaat and transferred to the Björnberg family shareholders. Myllykoski was reconstituted as a new company, Myllykosken Paperitehdas Oy, with Carl Gustaf Björnberg as CEO.

While Yhtyneet Paperitehtaat made large investments in facilities such as the Kaipola newsprint factory, Björnberg invested more cautiously at Myllykoski. The company focused on so-called SC paper for magazines and became a world leader in this field. The production technology was also introduced at the company's Madison Paper mill in the state of Maine, United States. In 1948 a factory for the manufacture of plasterboard for the construction industry was also built at Myllykoski.

=== Mining interests ===
In addition to his paper industry work, Björnberg took a keen interest in mining. The family-owned Ruskeala Marble company in Karelia was one of Finland's most important limestone quarries during the interwar period. After the post-war border changes transferred Ruskeala to the Soviet Union, Björnberg led the establishment of a new lime industry centre, Louhi lime factory in Kerimäki. From the mid-1930s, copper ore prospecting was carried out in northern Karelia on Björnberg's initiative. Deposits were discovered at Luikonlahti in Kaavi, where Myllykoski Oy began mining operations in 1965 as a result of Björnberg's long-term efforts.

=== Retirement ===
In 1978, at the age of 77, Carl Gustaf Björnberg stepped down as CEO after more than five decades as a business leader. His era was characterised by long-term thinking and a clear vision of company management. He rarely appeared in public, preferring to let the results of his work speak for themselves. He died in Helsinki in December 1995 at the age of 94.

== Legacy ==
Björnberg's children continued to lead the family company Myllykoski. His eldest son Fredrik Björnberg served as chairman of the board, his middle son Carl G. Björnberg as CEO, and his youngest son Hans J. Björnberg as chairman and CEO of the Partek group.
