= Juuso Walden =

Paper industrialist of 20th-century Finland

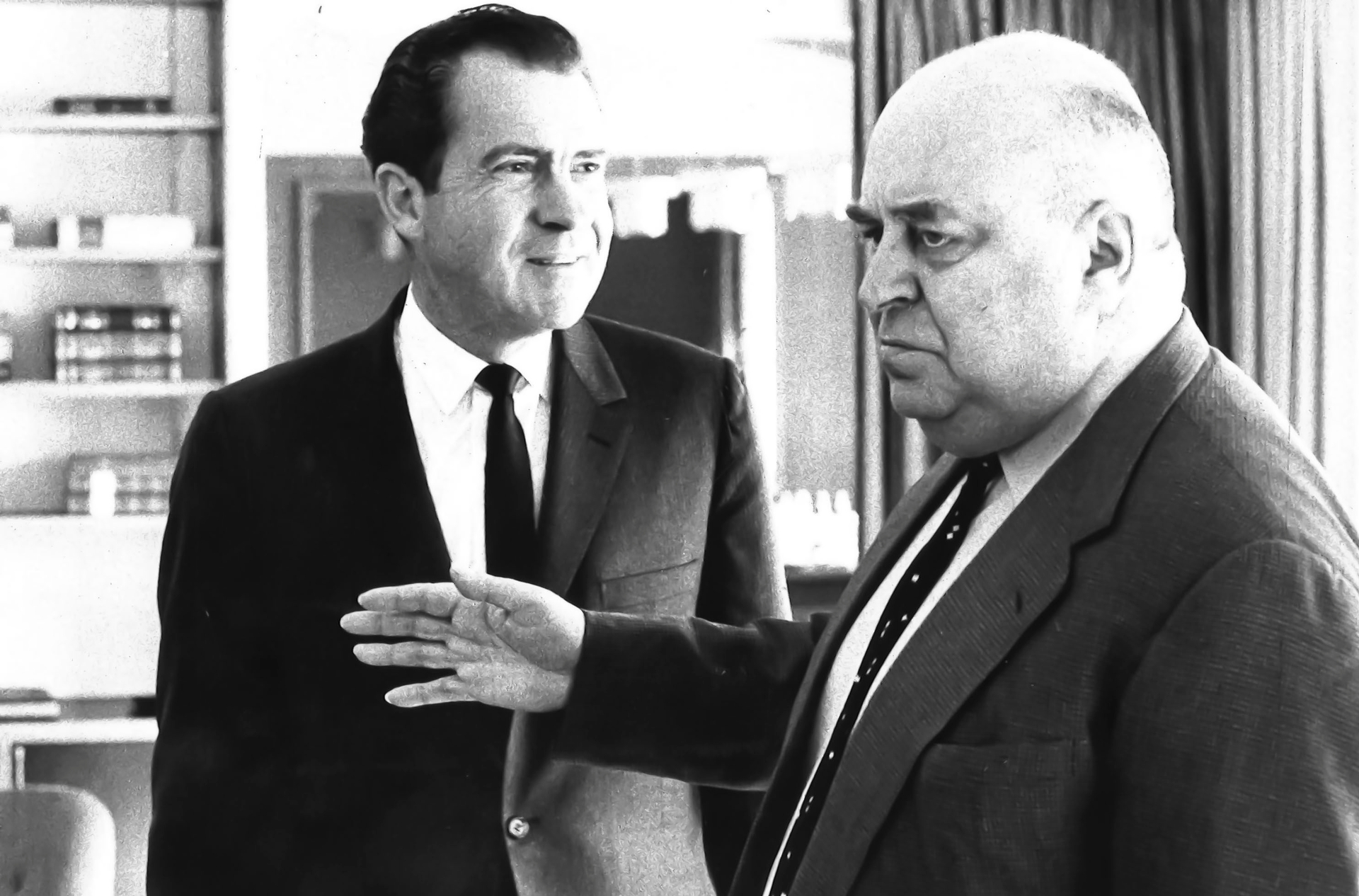
Juuso Walden (right) hosting Richard Nixon in April 1965

Juuso Walfrid Walden (5 April 1907 – 19 November 1972) was a Finnish industrial leader and entrepreneur, long term CEO of Yhtyneet Paperitehtaat, the predecessor of United Paper Mills.

== Early life and upbringing ==
Juuso Walden was born in Saint Petersburg, Russia in 1907. He received his Bachelor of Science degree in 1925 from the Helsinki School of Economics and completed his studies later in England on paper marketing. Since his early years, Juuso Walden worked at the mills of United Paper Mills founded by his father, general Rudolf Walden. Juuso started as a trainee, soon rose to become Office Manager and later Corporate Sales Manager. In 1940 During the Winter War, Juuso Walden was appointed president and CEO when his father was nominated Minister of Defence of Finland.

== Diffusion of United Paper Mills ==
After the death of Rudolf Walden in 1946, Juuso Walden was the head of the Walden family which was one of the two main shareholders of United Paper Mills together with the Björnberg family. The heads of the two families had differing views with regard to the development of the company and thus it was decided to divide the company into two halves early in 1952. The Björnberg's part, Myllykoski Oy, parted from United Paper Mills.

== Juuso Walden’s era 1952–1970 ==
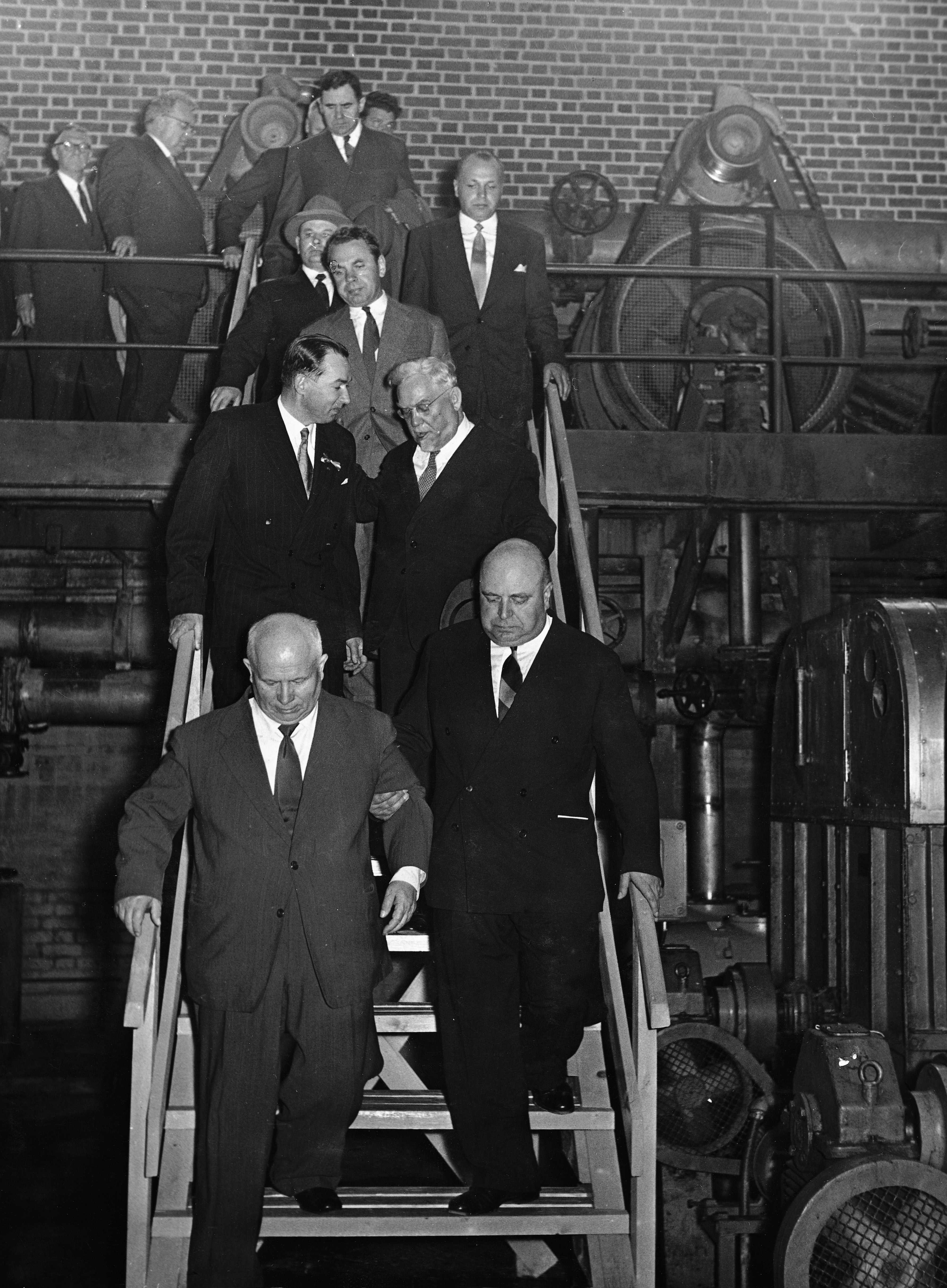
Walden with Nikita Khrushchev at the Kaipola paper mill in 1957

Walden immediately began a major expansion of the new United Paper Mills (now UPM) because he expected strong growth in the global paper demand. The most important mill was the Kaipola newsprint and magazine paper mill, which became, in the early 1960s, the largest of its kind outside the North American continent. Gradually Kaipola mill concentrated on producing super calendared magazine papers.

Under Walden's leadership, UPM was transformed into a multi-business company adding a wide and diversified paper and board converting business for export to the Soviet Union. Later, engineering works and a chemical factory were added to produce equipment and materials for the paper industry. The company also acquired some small mills in other countries, especially in Italy. These acquisitions were, however, not always economically feasible.

Walden was especially interested in the welfare of the personnel. He became a very popular Big Boss when he got involved into building houses so that employees could live in homes of their own. He was also greatly interested in all kinds of sports especially, association football. Juuso Walden was a longtime chairman of the Football Association of Finland. He hired several top-level athletes including Olympic Gold Medal Winners and World Champions to work for UPM.

Juuso Walden was one of the most important and visible industrial leaders in Finland. Due to his activities, the paper mill towns of UPM such as Jämsänkoski, Kaipola, and Valkeakoski became models for Finnish industry.

Juuso Walden retired in 1970 and died in 1972 in Valkeakoski.

== Personnel management in the factory communities in the era of Juuso Walden ==
Personnel management in the Valkeakoski paper mills community around 1924–1969 was dominated by Rudolf and his son Juuso Walden. This industrial community was managed in industrial paternalistic way. Although industrial paternalism had been abandoned in major part of the industry in the early 1900s. The central argument of this study is that Rudolf and Juuso Walden created a paternalist hold on the Valkeakoski industrial community, even if other industrial plants had already abandoned this idea. Walden's genuine goal was to create vibrant ideal communities around the factories. The problem was that the independent Finland was in its early stages and the nation was divided. After the Civil War of Finland the idea of ideal plant community was buried. United Paper Mills solution in this problem was to increase the satisfaction of the employees and give fatherly guidance to them. Rudolf Walden upheld a strong patriarchal tradition, and Juuso Walden continued in his footsteps until he resigned.

Preceded by Rudolf Walden	UPM, CEO; 1940–1969	Succeeded by Niilo Hakkarainen
Preceded by Carl Gustaf Björnberg	UPM, chairman 1952–1969	Succeeded by Matti Virkkunen
Preceded by Erik von Frenckell	Palloliitto, chairman of The Football Association of Finland; 1952–1963	Succeeded by Osmo P. Karttunen
