= Polder model =

Dutch method of consensus decision-making

The polder model (Dutch: poldermodel) is a method of consensus decision-making, based on the Dutch version of consensus-based economic and social policymaking in the 1980s and 1990s. It gets its name from the Dutch word (polder) for tracts of land enclosed by dikes.

The polder model has been described as "a pragmatic recognition of pluriformity" and "cooperation despite differences". It is thought that the Dutch politician Ina Brouwer was the first to use the term poldermodel, in her 1990 article "Het socialisme als poldermodel?" ("Socialism as Polder Model?"), although it is uncertain whether she coined the term or simply seems to have been the first to write it down.

== Socioeconomic polder model ==
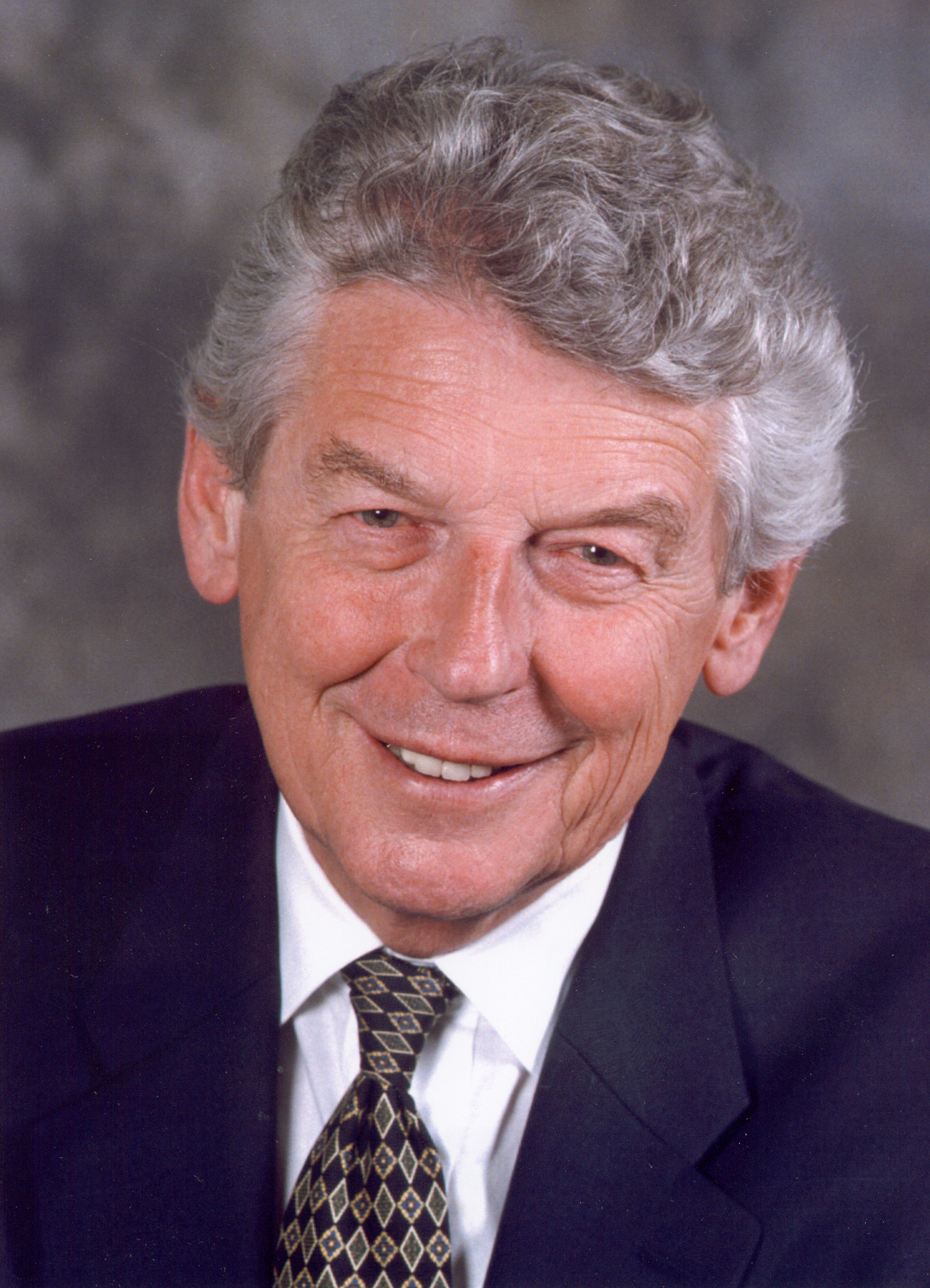
Wim Kok, former Prime Minister of the Netherlands, supported the polder model.

The Dutch polder model is characterised by the tripartist cooperation between employers' organisations such as VNO-NCW, labour unions such as the Federation Dutch Labour Movement, and the government. These talks are embodied in the Social-Economic Council (Dutch: Sociaal-Economische Raad, SER). The SER serves as the central forum to discuss labour issues and has a long tradition of consensus, often defusing labour conflicts and avoiding strike actions. Similar models are in use in Finland, namely the Comprehensive Income Policy Agreement and universal validity of collective labour agreements.

The current Dutch polder model is said to have begun with the Wassenaar Agreement of 1982, when unions, employers, and government decided on a comprehensive plan to revitalise the economy involving shorter working times and less pay on the one hand, and more employment on the other. It has increasingly steered in the direction of a neoliberal economic policy of privatisation and budget cuts.

An important role in this process was played by the Dutch Central Planning Bureau (CPB), founded by Jan Tinbergen. The CPB's policy advice since 1976, in particular with the Den Hartog and Tjan model, in favour of wage restraint, was an important argument, supportive for government and employers, that the unions could not easily counter. Many authors and researchers have argued that the importance of the Wassenaar Agreement has been largely overrated. Most of these writers have argued that considerable continuity can be seen from the 1950s onwards. Historian Stijn Kuipers, goes even further. In an article reliant on the work of Coen Helderman, Kuipers argues that the modern socioeconomic polder model already manifested itself in 1920 with the Dutch High Council of Labour. It follows that the polder model is therefore much older and could have had a larger influence on Dutch society and economy than previously thought.

== Other uses ==
The term polder model and especially the verb polderen ("to polder") has been used pejoratively by some politicians to describe the slow decision-making process where all parties have to be heard. The model flourished under the purple coalition governments of Prime Minister Wim Kok, a coalition including the traditional rivals the Labour Party (a social democratic party, whose colour is red) and the People's Party for Freedom and Democracy (conservative liberals, whose colour is blue). In the declining economic climate of the early 21st century, the model came under fierce attack particularly from right-wing politicians and Pim Fortuyn in his book entitled De puinhopen van acht jaar Paars (The Wreckage of Eight Years Purple).

== Historical background ==
There is no consensus about the exact historical background of the polder model. In general, there are three views on this subject. One explanation points to the rebuilding of the Netherlands after World War II. Corporatism was an important feature of Christian democracy and particularly Catholic political thought. During the postwar period, the Catholic, Protestant, Christian, social democratic, and liberal parties decided to work together to reconstruct the Netherlands, as did labour unions and employers' organizations. Important institutions of the polder model like the SER were founded in this period. No single political party has ever had anything approaching an overall majority in parliament, so a coalition government is inevitable. This makes parties extremely cautious, since today's enemy may be tomorrow's ally, all the more so in present times when the perceived death of ideology has made it possible for almost all the parties to work together.

Another explanation points to the dependency of the Netherlands on international trade and the world economy. The Dutch cannot afford protectionism against the unpredictable tides of the international economy because the Netherlands is not an autarkic economy. To cushion against the international economy, they set up the Social-Economic Council, which oversaw an extensive welfare state. A third explanation refers to a unique aspect of the Netherlands, that it consists in large part of polders, land reclaimed from the sea, which requires constant pumping and maintenance of the dykes. Ever since the Middle Ages, when the process of land reclamation began, different societies living in the same polder have been forced to cooperate because without unanimous agreement on shared responsibility for maintenance of the dykes and pumping stations, the polders would have flooded and everyone would have suffered. Crucially, even when different cities in the same polder were at war, they still had to cooperate in this respect. This is thought to have taught the Dutch to set aside differences for a greater purpose.

== See also ==
- Bipartisanship
- Trasformismo
