= Betrothal of January =

Declaration by Finnish industry to recognize the trade unions

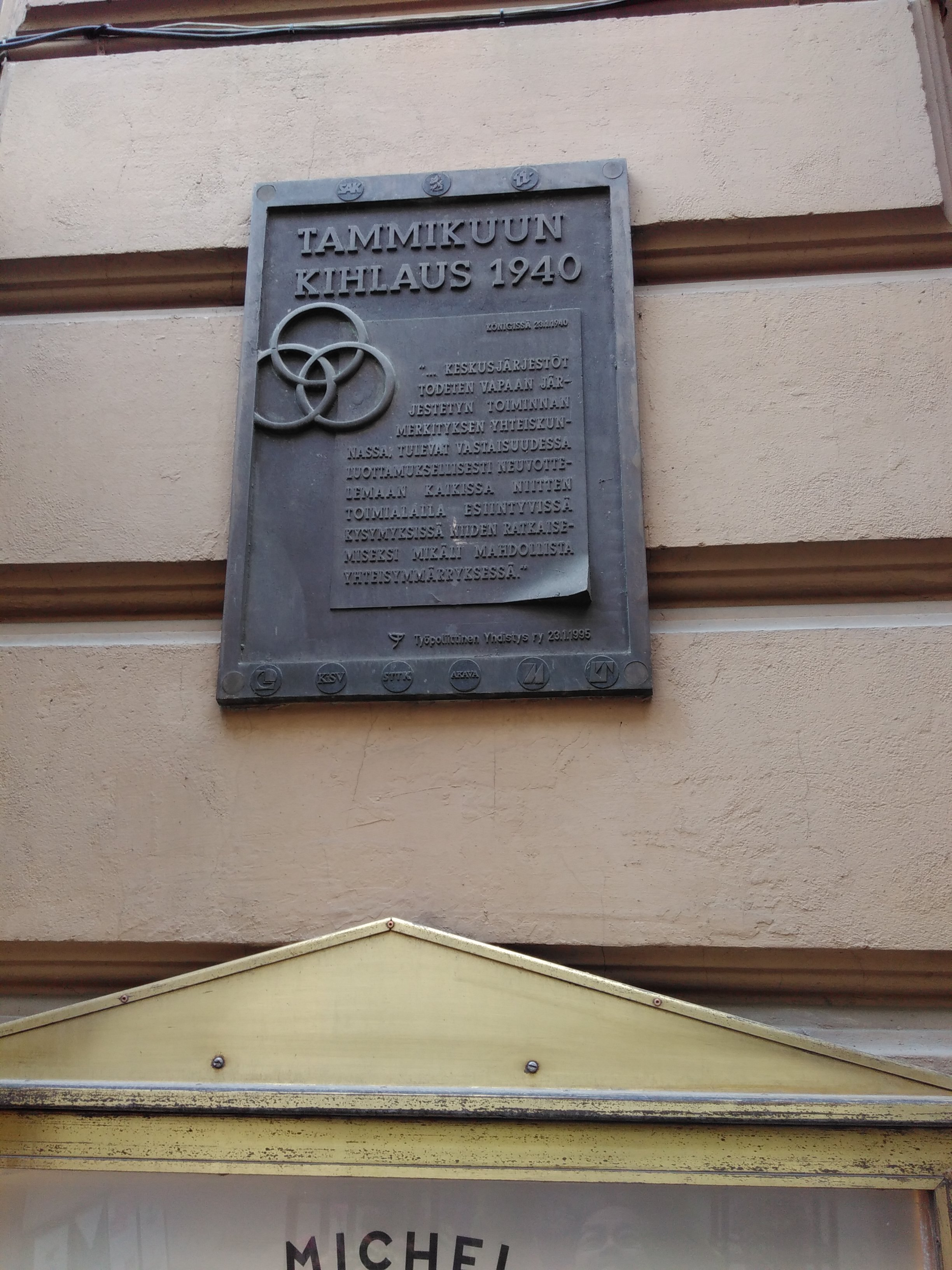
A sign commemorating the agreement in front of König Restaurant in Helsinki, where the deal was struck.

The Betrothal of January or January Engagement (Finnish: tammikuun kihlaus, Swedish: januariförlovningen) was a declaration given by the Association of Finnish Industries that recognized the trade unions and their central organization the Finnish Federation of Trade Unions (SAK) as parties in collective bargaining on questions of industrial relations. The two sides agreed that they would start trying to reach a common understanding for further negotiation. The declaration was read on the evening news bulletin of the public service radio Yle on 23 January 1940 and published in newspapers the following day. Until then, only printers had collective agreements on their working conditions.

The Betrothal agreement was part of the so-called Spirit of the Winter War and eventually the national income policy agreement. In February 2017, the Confederation of Finnish Industries (the successor of the Association of Finnish Industries) announced that it would withdraw from the 22 existing agreements and no longer participate in any negotiations for tripartite agreements.
