= Tauno Matomäki =

Finnish businessman (born 1937)

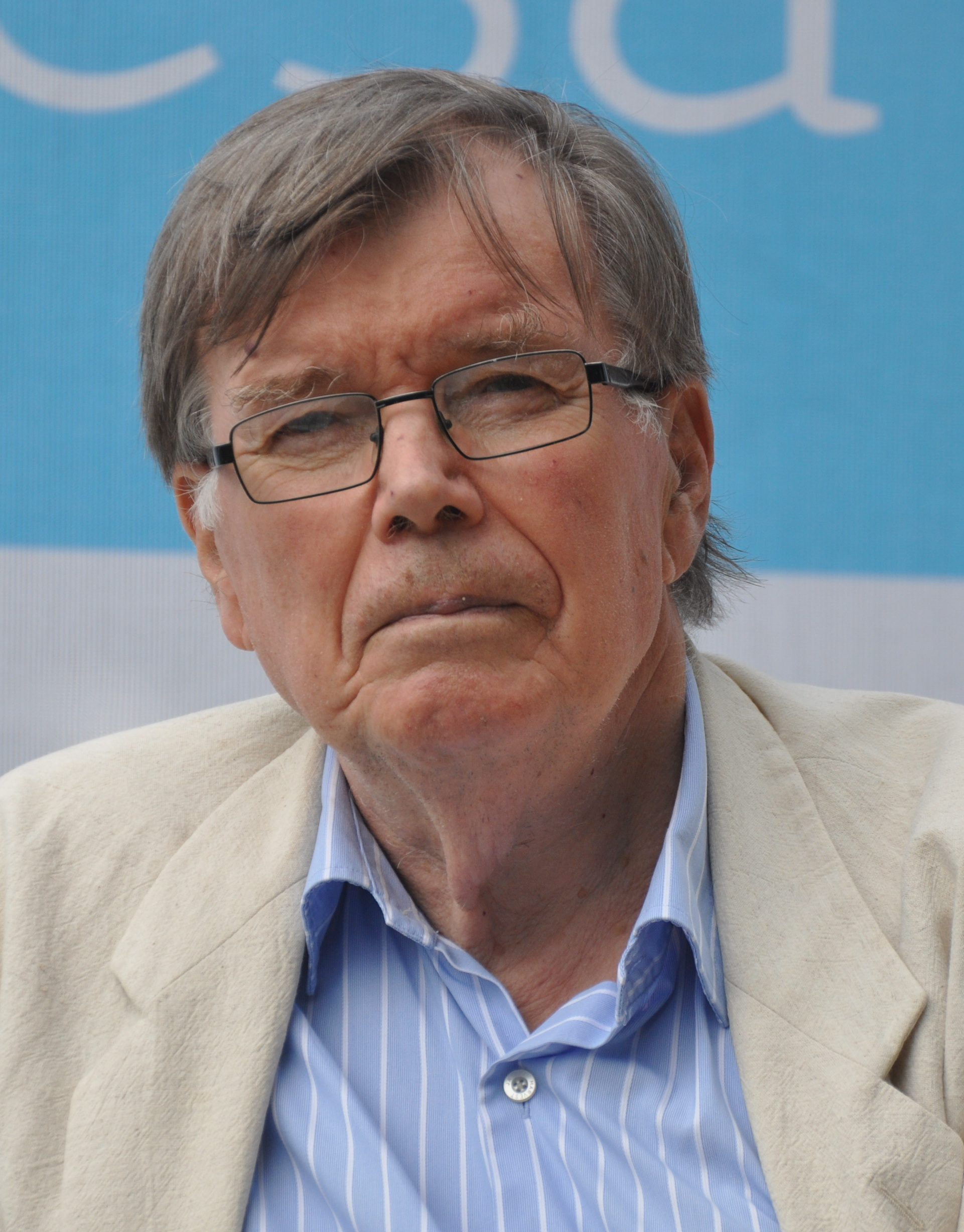
Tauno Matomäki in 2014

Tauno Antero Matomäki (born 14 April 1937) is a vuorineuvos (honorary title granted by the president of Finland), honorary doctorate in engineering and a diplomi-insinööri. He was the president and CEO of Rauma-Repola Oy from 1987 to 1990, the president and CEO of Repola Oyj from 1991 to 1996 and the chairman of the board of UPM-Kymmene.

Matomäki was born in Nakkila, Finland. His son Tommi Matomäki has served as the managing director of Technip Offshore Finland's Mäntyluoto shipyard. He is the uncle of Finnish mathematician Kaisa Matomäki.
