= Incomes policy =

Economy-wide wage and price controls

Incomes policies in economics are economy-wide wage and price controls, most commonly instituted as a response to inflation, and usually seeking to establish wages and prices below free-market level. Incomes policies have often been resorted to during wartime. During the French Revolution, "The Law of the Maximum" imposed price controls (by penalty of death) in an unsuccessful attempt to curb inflation, and such measures were also attempted after World War II. Peacetime income policies were resorted to in the U.S. in August 1971 as a response to inflation. The wage and price controls were effective initially but were made less restrictive in January 1973, and later removed when they seemed to be having no effect on curbing inflation. Incomes policies were successful in the United Kingdom during World War II but less successful in the post-war era.

== Theory ==
Incomes policies vary from voluntary wage and price guidelines to mandatory controls like price/wage freezes. One variant is "tax-based incomes policies" (TIPs), where a government fee is imposed on those firms that raise prices and/or wages more than the controls allow. Some economists agree that a credible incomes policy would help prevent inflation; however, by arbitrarily interfering with price signals, it provides an additional bar to achieving economic efficiency, potentially leading to shortages and declines in the quality of goods on the market and requiring large government bureaucracies for enforcement. That happened in the United States during the early 1970s. When the price of a good is lowered artificially, it creates less supply and more demand for the product, thereby creating shortages.

Some economists argue that incomes policies are less expensive (more efficient) than recessions as a way of fighting inflation, at least for mild inflation. Others argue that controls and mild recessions can be complementary solutions for relatively mild inflation. The policy has the best chance of being credible and effective for the sectors of the economy dominated by monopolies or oligopolies, particularly nationalised industry, with a significant sector of workers organized in labor unions. Such institutions enable collective negotiation and monitoring of the wage and price agreements. Other economists argue that inflation is essentially a monetary phenomenon, and the only way to deal with it is by controlling the money supply, directly or by changing interest rates. They argue that price inflation is only a symptom of previous monetary inflation caused by central bank money creation. They believe that without a totally planned economy the incomes policy can never work, the excess money in the economy greatly distorting other areas, exempt from the policy.

== Examples ==
=== France ===
During the French Revolution in the 1790s, "The Law of the Maximum" was imposed in an attempt to decrease inflation. It consisted of limits on wages and food prices. Many dissidents were executed for breaking this law. The law was repealed 14 months after its introduction. By turning the crimes of price gouging and food hoarding into crimes against the government, Revolutionary France had limited success. With respect to its overt intention, that of ensuring the people were able to purchase food at a reasonable rate, the Maximum was mostly a failure. Some merchants having found themselves forced into a position to sell their goods for a price below cost (e.g. cost of baking bread or growing vegetables) chose to hide their expensive goods from the market, either for personal use or for sale on the black market; however, the General Maximum was very successful in deflecting a volatile political issue away from the Committee of Public Safety and Maximilien Robespierre, enabling them to focus on larger political issues more closely related to completing the French Revolution.

By creating the General Maximum, Robespierre shifted the attention of the French people away from government involvement in widespread shortages of money and food to a fight between consumers and merchants. The text of the General Maximum was written towards businessmen who were profiting on a large scale from the demise of the French economy. In practice, the law ultimately targeted local shopkeepers, butchers, bakers, and farmers-the merchants who were profiting the least from the economic crisis. With the General Maximum, Robespierre offered the people an answer regarding whom to blame for their poverty and their hunger. Furthermore, considering its association with the Law of Suspects, when a citizen informed the government about a merchant who was in violation of the law, they were considered to have done their civic duty.

=== United States ===
During World War II, price controls were used in an attempt to control wartime inflation. The Franklin Roosevelt Administration instituted the OPA (Office of Price Administration). That agency was rather unpopular with business interests and was phased out as quickly as possible after peace had been restored; however, the Korean War brought a return to the same inflationary pressures, and price controls were again established, this time under the Office of Price Stabilization. In the early 1970s, inflation had been much higher than in previous decades, getting above 6% briefly in 1970 and persisting above 4% in 1971. U.S. President Richard Nixon imposed price controls on August 15, 1971. This was a move widely applauded by the public and a number of Keynesian economists. The same day, Nixon also suspended the convertibility of the dollar into gold, which was the beginning of the end of the Bretton Woods system of international currency management established after World War II. The 90-day freeze was unprecedented in peacetime, but such drastic measures were thought necessary. It was quite well known at the time that this would likely lead to an immediate inflationary impulse (essentially because the subsequent depreciation of the dollar would boost the demand for exports and increase the cost of imports). The controls aimed to stop that impulse. The fact that the election of 1972 was on the horizon likely contributed to both Nixon's application of controls and his ending of the convertibility of the dollar.

The 90-day freeze became nearly 1,000 days of measures known as Phases One, Two, Three, and Four, ending in 1973. In these phases, the controls were applied almost entirely to the biggest corporations and labor unions, which were seen as having price-setting power; however, 93% of requested price increases were granted and seen as necessary to meet costs. With such monopoly power, some economists saw controls as possibly working effectively, although they are usually skeptical on the issue of controls. Because controls of this sort can calm inflationary expectations, this was seen as a serious blow against stagflation. The first wave of controls were successful at curbing inflation temporarily while the administration used expansionary fiscal and monetary policies; however, the long-term effects proved to be destabilizing. Left unsuppressed after the initial price controls were relaxed, the overly expansionary policies proceeded to exacerbate inflationary pressures. Meat also began disappearing from grocery store shelves and Americans protested wage controls that did not allow wages to keep up with inflation. Since that time, the U.S. government has not imposed maximum prices on consumer items or labor, although the cap on oil and natural gas prices persisted for years after 1973. During times of high inflation, controls have been called for; in 1980 during unprecedented inflation, BusinessWeek editorialized in favor of semi-permanent wage and price controls.

=== Canada ===
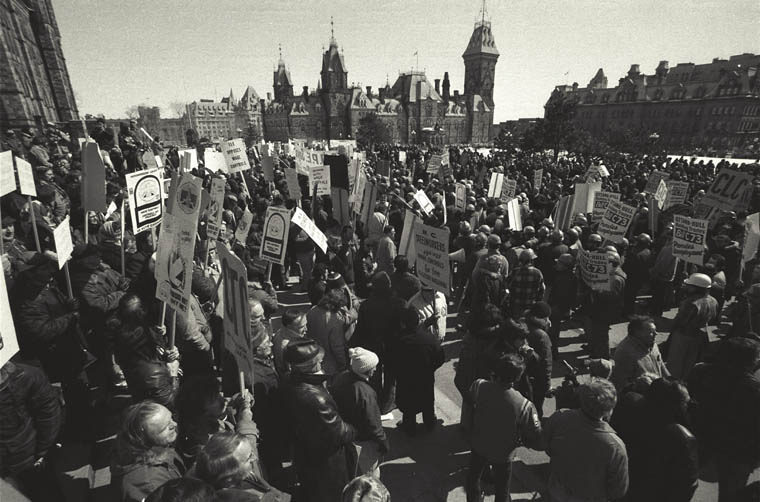
Demonstration against wage controls during World War II on Parliament Hill in Ottawa, Ontario

During the 1974 Canadian federal election, Progressive Conservative Party leader Robert Stanfield proposed the imposition of a wage and price freeze on the Canadian economy as a response to rising inflation due to the 1973 oil crisis. The Liberal government under Pierre Trudeau was originally opposed to this idea; however, after winning the election, it introduced the Anti-Inflation Act in 1975. This act contained wage and price controls on parts of the economy and remained in force until 1978. In 1979, the anti-inflation board was dissolved and the Anti-Inflation Act repealed.

=== United Kingdom ===
The National Board for Prices and Incomes was created by the Labour government led by Harold Wilson in 1965 in an attempt to solve the problem of inflation in the British economy by managing wages and prices. The Heath government abolished this in 1970, but in 1973 introduced the Price Commission. The Callaghan government in the 1970s sought to reduce conflict over wages and prices through a social contract in which unions would accept smaller wage increases, and business would constrain price increases, imitating Nixon's policy in America. Price controls ended with the election of Margaret Thatcher in 1979.

=== Australia ===
Australia implemented an incomes policy, called the Prices and Incomes Accord during the 1980s. The Accord was an agreement between trade unions and the Hawke Labor government. Employers were not party to the Accord. Unions agreed to restrict wage demands, and the government pledged action to minimise inflation and price rises. The government was also to act on the social wage. At its broadest, this concept included increased spending on education as well as welfare. Inflation declined during the period of the Accord, which was renegotiated several times; however, many of the key elements of the Accord were weakened over time, as unions sought a shift from centralised wage fixation to enterprise bargaining. The Accord ceased to play a major role after the recession of 1989–1992, and was abandoned after the Labor government was defeated in 1996.

=== Italy ===
Italy imitated the United States' price and wage controls in 1971 but soon gave up the policy to focus on controlling the price of oil.

=== The Netherlands and Belgium ===
The polder model in the Netherlands is characterized by tri-partite cooperation between employers' organizations like VNO-NCW, labour unions like the FNV, and the government. These talks are embodied in the Social Economic Council (Dutch: Sociaal-Economische Raad, SER). The SER serves as the central forum to discuss labour issues and has a long tradition of consensus, often defusing labour conflicts and avoiding strikes. Similar models are in use in Finland, namely Comprehensive Income Policy Agreement and universal validity of collective labour agreements. The polder model is said to have begun with the Wassenaar Accords of 1982 when unions, employers and government decided on a comprehensive plan to revitalize the economy involving shorter working times and less pay on the one hand, and more employment on the other. This model is also used in Belgium, hence its name (the "polders" are a region comprising the Netherlands and the northern part of Belgium). The polder model is widely, but not universally, regarded as successful incomes management policy.

=== New Zealand ===
In 1982, then Prime Minister and Finance Minister Rob Muldoon imposed a simultaneous freeze on wages, prices and interest rates in an effort to curb inflation, despite public resistance. These measures were subsequently repealed by Muldoon's successor David Lange and Finance Minister Roger Douglas.

=== Zimbabwe ===
In 2007, Robert Mugabe's government imposed a price freeze in Zimbabwe because of hyperinflation. That policy led only to shortages.
