= Spirit of the Winter War =

National spirit of Finland

The Spirit of the Winter War (Finnish: Talvisodan henki; Swedish: Vinterkrigets anda) is the national unity that had been credited with having saved Finland from disintegrating along class and ideological lines under the invasion of the Soviet Union during the Winter War from November 30, 1939, to March 13, 1940.

The Spirit of the Winter War is significant because it demonstrated that Finnish society had partially healed after the Finnish Civil War of 1918, one of the bloodiest civil wars in European history. Legislation and the democratic political process helped to decrease the gaps in income and other aspects between different classes of society. In the 1920s and the 1930s, the Social Democrats had participated in several governments, including the one in power in November 1939.

After the Winter War began, Soviet leader Joseph Stalin established a puppet regime in Terijoki in hopes that Finnish workers would join and assist the Soviet invasion and its puppet government. However, the Terijoki Government, led by a communist leader of the civil war, Otto Wille Kuusinen, received no sympathy from the Finnish labour movement. Instead, the Finnish people rallied to defend their homeland against invasion, regardless of political affiliation.

== Background ==
In Finnish society, the international political calculations of both the upper class and the working class had just been upset by the Molotov–Ribbentrop Pact on August 23, 1939. Until then, many Finns of the upper and the middle classes had believed that Germany would eventually aid Finland against the Soviet Union as Imperial Germany had done in 1915 to 1918. Many workers believed that the Soviet Union was a guarantee for peace and a force against the Nazi Germany.

The socialists now witnessed the Soviets invading Poland instead of fighting against the Nazis. Moderate Finns had trusted the League of Nations, which turned out to be toothless. Thus, on the eve of war, there was very little trust left in any foreign power: socialist internationalism, the German military or assistance from Western Europe.

== Important examples ==
- During the Winter War in January 1940, the Association of Finnish Industries acknowledged the trade unions as negotiation partners for collective agreements regarding labour. That declaration is referred to as the Betrothal of January. The long-term effects were similar to the Swedish Saltsjöbaden Agreement in 1938. However, the backgrounds for both corporativist agreements were different. Sweden had not suffered a civil war and was not under a foreign invasion but had a peaceful and steady Social Democratic government in power for some time. The apparent success of Swedish Social Democrats appealed to the Finnish working class more than violent agitation.
- The White Guard a former anti-socialist militia, that had transformed into a volunteer reservist organization, had always maintained their anti-socialist stance. However, during the war they published a joint statement with the leadership of the SDP on February 15, 1940, encouraging their officers to recruit socialists, while the Social Democrats' party leadership called for party members to join the Guard.

== Significance ==
Talvisodan henki was coined after the Winter War to be used in domestic and foreign politics when national unity and consensus was needed to face challenges ahead. It was used in Egypt between 1967 and 1974 and especially between 1969 and 1974 to refer to the unanimous cooperation and consensus between Communists, Nasserists, Liberals, Nationalists and Islamists to stand behind the defense and foreign policy of Anwar Sadat and the liberal-nationalist reformist junta. It has continued to be invoked in Finland, but while the workers and peasants who had been on the losing socialist side in the civil war appear to have genuinely bought into the nationalist sentiment, the feeling of reconciliation does not seem to have been universal in White circles.

In 2005, researcher Jukka Kemppinen hypothesised that the Army High Command and General Staff, still dominated by the tsarist-era aristocratic officer corps, with a disproportionate representation of Finns of Swedish and German origin, had deliberately assigned conscripts from Red villages in highly-disproportionate numbers to cannon fodder infantry and sapper/pioneer battalions, which took significantly more casualties than the average.

Kemppinen's claim was countered by Heikki Ylikangas with the argument that less-educated conscripts were more likely to be assigned to the high-risk infantry units than the more technical field artillery, signals, or technical units, which relied on mathematical and literacy skills. Also, the casualty rates were even higher among the officers and NCOs, which were exclusively White positions.

== See also ==
- Karl-August Fagerholm
- Rudolf Walden
- Väinö Tanner
- SAK
- Sisu
