= Tripartism =

Economic system of neo-corporatism

Tripartism is an economic system of neo-corporatism based on a mixed economy and tripartite contracts between employers' organizations, trade unions, and the government of a country. Each is to act as a social partner to create economic policy through cooperation, consultation, negotiation, and compromise. In Tripartism, the government has a large role in the economy and engages in negotiations between labour unions and business interest groups to establish economic policy.

Tripartism became a popular form of economic policy during the economic crisis of the 1930s. Tripartism was supported by several different political movements at this time, including: Catholic social teaching, fascism, and democratic political movements. Tripartism is a prominent economic policy in Europe, particularly where Christian democratic parties influenced by Catholic social teaching have held power; it is a core part of the Nordic model seen in the economic systems of Scandinavia and the Benelux that were put in place by social democratic governments. Another example is the national income policy agreement in Finland. Globally, tripartite institutions, such as Ghana's Tripartite Committee and Singapore's National Trade Union Congress, have been implemented into economic systems. Tripartite agreements are an important component in practical labour law, since they cover not only wages but also issues such as policies on benefits, holiday, work hours, and worker safety.

== International Labour Organization ==
The International Labour Organization (ILO) is the only United Nations agency that is based on tripartism. It uses the discussions between the three groups in drafting of standards and conventions. Also for the implementation of ILO-standards in national law, tripartite consultations on a national level are a requirement for those countries party to the Tripartite Consultation (International Labour Standards) Convention, 1976. The United States withdrew from the ILO in 1977, based partly on the claim that Communist countries could not send authentically tripartite representation. The United States restored its membership with the ILO in 1980, with United States president Jimmy Carter having established the President's Committee on the ILO (PC/ILO).

=== History of tripartism in the ILO ===
Some countries already used a tripartite structure to deal with social issues at the end of 19th century, and World War I made this type of approach far more urgent. In this new kind of conflict, military success was tightly bound up with the ability of nations to support increasing demands on their economies and to build ever more sophisticated weapons, which demanded concerted industrial efforts. Business and labour had to become involved in policy and cooperate to support the national effort.

During the war, Allied countries had made many promises to trade unions and employers so that they could rely on business' contribution to the war effort. Trade unions and employers were invited to sit on governmental bodies in Great Britain, the United States, and elsewhere. Moreover, unions were asked to forego acquired trade union rights for the sake of the war effort with promises that these rights would be restored after the conflict.

The first draft of the labour proposals for the peace conference had been prepared by the British government and became the basis for the discussions in the Labour Commission, and these proposals included the establishment of an international organization for labour legislation that would give a voting role to representatives of workers and employers. The ILO offered the world a different way to solve social strife; it provided it with the procedures and techniques of bargaining and negotiation to replace violent conflict as a means of securing more humane and dignified conditions of work. While there have been problems along the way, tripartism generally survived without a successful challenge to the principle, despite attempts by the Soviet Union, in particular, to weaken it. As World War II came to a close, the value of tripartism was reaffirmed in the Declaration of Philadelphia.

=== ILO tripartism in practice ===
The implications of tripartism in the ILO are manifold. The participation in the ILO deliberations of delegates directly representing the interest of workers and employers adds a connection with economic reality that cannot be reproduced in an organization where governments are the only spokespersons. The roles played by representatives of workers and employers differ markedly. For workers, the ILO is a major instrument to pursue their goals, and they have a much more active agenda than employers. On the other hand, employers frequently play the role of the brake on initiatives put forward both by the workers and the Office and its Director-General to slow action they consider hasty, or which would work against the perceived interest of business. The ILO is valuable for both workers and employers because of the voice and influence that it offers them.

When discussing the ILO's remarkable survival through World War II, the importance of tripartism, as having been both a straitjacket and a lifejacket, is highlighted. As the ILO's Committee on Freedom of Association put it, "the right conferred upon workers' and employers' organizations must be based on respect for those civil liberties which have been enunciated in particular in the Universal Declaration of Human Rights, the absence of these civil liberties removes all meaning from the concept of trade union rights."

Even if tripartism makes the ILO far more representative of civil society than any other intergovernmental organization, employers', and workers' organization, employers’ and workers’ organizations necessarily represent the formal economy rather than the huge and growing-informal economy, especially in developing nations. In addition, with membership of trade unions shrinking in many industrialized states, the representativeness of these organizations even in the formal sector is often questioned.

The challenge for the ILO and its constituents is to adapt the tripartite model to a globalizing world, where there are new actors operating outside national frameworks and increasingly diverse forms of voice and representation. Some measures of accommodation have been found, for instance involving cooperation with NGOs in action against child labour, and dialogue with parliamentarians and other important actors. The broader challenge remains.

== See also ==
- Collective bargaining
- Nordic model
- Polder model
- Rhine capitalism
- Social corporatism
- Social market economy
- National Tripartite Committee

== Bibliography ==
- Beigbeder, Yves (1979). "The United States' Withdrawal from the International Labor Organization" (PDF). Relations Industrielles / Industrial Relations. 34 (2): 223–240. doi:10.7202/028959ar.
- Rodgers, Gerry; Lee, Eddy; Swepston, Lee; Van Daele, Jasmien (2009). The International Labour Organization and the Quest for Social Justice, 1919–2009 (PDF). Geneva: International Labour Organization. ISBN 978-92-2-121955-2.
- Slomp, Hans (2000). European Politics into the Twenty-First Century: Integration and Division. Westport, Connecticut: Praeger Publishers. ISBN 978-0-275-96800-7.
- Standing, Guy (2008). "The ILO: An Agency for Globalization?" (PDF). Development and Change. 39 (3): 355–384. CiteSeerX 10.1.1.593.4931. doi:10.1111/j.1467-7660.2008.00484.x.
- Wiarda, Howard J. (1996). Corporatism and Comparative Politics: The Other Great "Ism". Comparative Politics Series. Armonk, New York: M. E. Sharpe. ISBN 978-1-56324-715-6.
