= Yhtyneet Paperitehtaat =

Finnish foresting company

Yhtyneet Paperitehtaat Oy
- Trade name: United Paper Mills Ltd. (English translation)
- Formerly: Ab Simpele Jämsänkoski Oy, Myllykoski Träsliperi Ab, Ab Walkiakoski Oy
- Company type: Former Public Limited Company
- Industry: Forest industry, Pulp and Paper
- Predecessor: Ab Simpele Jämsänkoski Oy, Myllykoski Träsliperi Ab, Ab Walkiakoski Oy
- Founded: 1920 in Finland
- Founder: Rudolf Walden
- Defunct: 1996 (merged)
- Fate: Merged with Kymmene Oy to form UPM-Kymmene
- Successor: UPM-Kymmene Oyj
- Headquarters: Finland, Finland
- Area served: International
- Key people: Rudolf Walden (founder, chairman 1920–1944), Juuso Walden (managing director 1940–1969), Niilo Hakkarainen (managing director 1970–1991), Olli Parola (managing director 1990–1995)
- Products: Paper, Pulp, Cardboard
- Parent: Repola Oy (prior to merger)

Yhtyneet Paperitehtaat Oy was a Finnish forest industry company which was created in 1920 and the paper company formed UPM-Kymmene PLC together with Kymmene in 1996.

== History ==
United Paper Mills Ltd. was created in summer 1920 when Ab Simpele Jämsänkoski Oy and Myllykoski Träsliperi Ab merged. Later Ab Walkiakoski Oy that is located in Valkeakoski was merged with the company. In the management of all the companies the large owner was general Rudolf Walden. General Walden's objective was to form as big as possible and competitive unit of Finland's scattered forest industry. The same objective was striven for by founding Finland's Paperitehdass association (1918–1996) Finnpap and cardboard association Finnboard.

Myllykoski Oy separated from United Paper Mills Ltd. Oy 1952. In the 1950s the paper mill of Kaipola was built. The ones which had united extended strongly and drifted into financing difficulties at the end of the 1960s. In 1970 and the 1980s the company aimed abroad and invests on the EEC market and Stracelin to the factories, Shotton. In 1989 UPM merged Kajaani Oy with himself.

The company met the recession of the 1990s in Finland in good profit performance. With the management of Kansallis-Osake-Pankki the company was merged with Rauma-Repola. Repola Oy which became the biggest industrial enterprise in Finland was formed. UPM formed the wood industry of the conglomerate when Rauma Oy formed the metal industry. In 1996 Yhtyneet Paperitehtaat Oy as part of Repola conglomerate was merged with Kymmene Oy, the result was one of the largest wood industry companies in the world, UPM-Kymmene Oy. Finnpap also was merged as part of a new company.

== Management of Yhtyneet Paperitehtaat 1920-1995 ==
- General Rudolf Walden, founder, head owner and chairman of the government 1920–1944
- mining counsellor Juuso Walden managing director 1940–1969
- dipl INS. Niilo Hakkarainen, managing director 1970–1991
- dipl INS. Olli Parola, managing director 1990–1995

== Managers of UPM-Kymmene ==
- Master of Science in Economics and Business Administration, mining counsellor Juha Niemelä 1995–2004
- dipl INS. Jussi Pesonen 2004
