= National income policy agreement =

Model of consensus-building between employees, employers and the Nordic government

Finnish national income policy agreements or comprehensive income policy agreements (Finnish: tulopoliittinen kokonaisratkaisu, often called tupo; Swedish: inkomstpolitiskt helhetsavtal) are tripartite agreements between Finnish trade unions, employers' organizations, and the Finnish government. They are policy documents covering a wide range of economic and political issues, such as salaries, taxation, pensions, unemployment benefits, and housing costs. They represent collective bargaining taken to its logical maximum, reaching virtually all wage-earners. Their enforcement is made easier by the universal validity of collective labour agreements. However, they are voluntary agreements and are not considered government legislation, i.e. they do not represent central planning of the economy.

In national income policy agreements, the government and the employees' and employers' organizations attempt to reach a common understanding of the best choices for the national economy in terms of economic growth and real wages. The basic conundrum is simple: employees want higher salaries, employers want no wage hikes. The government wants to maintain international competitiveness and a high employment rate, while simultaneously ensuring sufficient tax revenues and keeping inflation in check.

National income policy agreements are usually valid for a two-year period. These agreements are not compulsory. If the employers' and employees' national organisations cannot agree on terms, no agreement is signed. In that case, negotiations on salaries are carried out by individual trade federations with no government participation. Sometimes talks are not even initiated due to differences of opinion between employers' and employees' organizations.

== History ==
The first national income policy agreement was negotiated by National Labour Dispute Conciliator Keijo Liinamaa. In 1967, Liinamaa was given a special task by Prime Minister Rafael Paasio: Liinamaa was to negotiate a comprehensive economic deal with employers' organisations and labour unions in order to prevent inflation due to rising wages. These negotiations resulted in the first national income policy agreement, the so-called "Liinamaa I" and brought fame to Liinamaa, a later caretaker prime minister. The tradition of comprehensive agreements has been particularly persistent since then, even if there are always doomsayers predicting their end. Currently, there is no such agreement. This follows from the political pressures to increase public sector competitivity that led to comparatively higher increases in public sector wages, particularly nurses' wages.

In 2008, the main employer's union Confederation of Finnish Industries, representing 70% of Finland's GDP, announced that new national income policy agreements will not be made, and that they will radically reduce the influence of the central union, and close down the special office that has prepared previous agreements. The reasons cited were the inflexibility of comprehensive agreements, their incompatibility with global markets and the differences between different industries. This was met by accusations of irresponsibility from some trade union leaders.

The agreements have ultimately been an effective way to curb inflation, particularly in recent times where globalization has placed pressure on both the employers and employees. The consensus policy unravelled several "perpetual inflation machine" problems: wages tied to price indices, constant competition over nominal wages between different employee unions resulting in constant nominal wage hikes, the government effectively subsidising these wage hikes by subsidising exports based on costs (including wages), and perpetual strikes to increase minor benefits (particularly Niilo Wälläri's seamen's union). On the other hand, a comprehensive agreement maintains distortions that have arisen between different industries, i.e. when wages are too low in one industry relative to other industries.

== See also ==
- Betrothal of January
- Collective bargaining
- Incomes policy
- Labour law
- Polder Model
- Trade union
- Tripartism
