= Rudolf Walden =

Finnish general and industrialist (1878–1946)

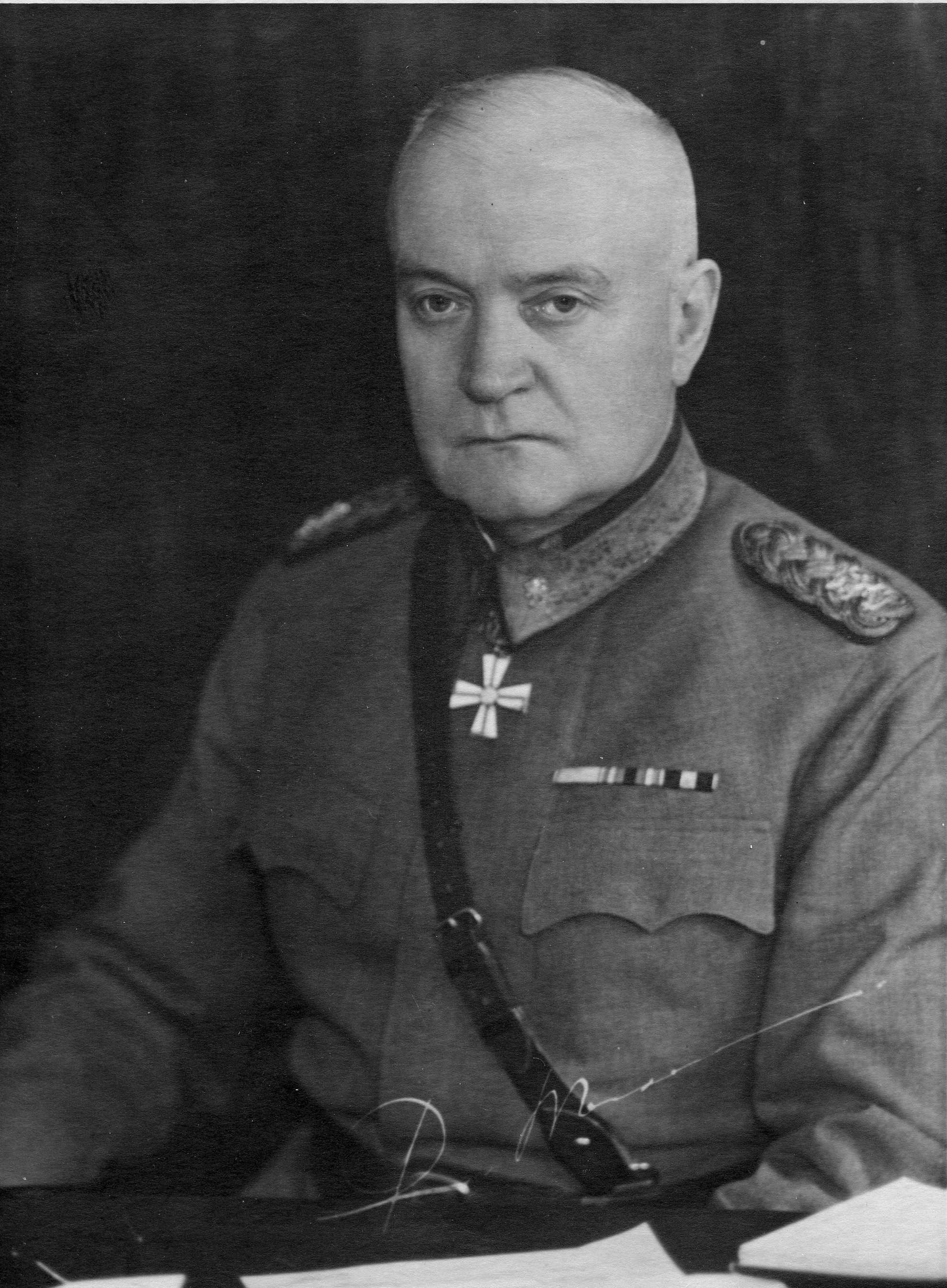
Rudolf Walden

Karl Rudolf Walden (1 December 1878 in Helsinki – 25 October 1946) was a Finnish industrialist and military leader. He served as Minister of War from 1918 to 1919 and Minister of Defence from 1940 to 1944.

== Education ==
Walden received his military education at the Hamina Cadet School and graduated in 1900. He was dismissed from service in 1902, in connection with conscription strikes.

== Finnish civil war ==
From 20 February 1918 till 5 March 1918, Walden was chief of Vaasa military district. From then until 6 May 1918, he was chief of headquarters of the rear. He then became chief of security of the occupied areas until 22 May 1918. On 28 November 1918, Walden became minister of war and held this position until 15 August 1919. Walden was then promoted to commander in chief of the Finnish army and the Civil Guard (27 November 1918 - 30 December 1918). Walden and general of the White army Carl Gustaf Emil Mannerheim developed a close working relationship that continued throughout the inter war period (head of Finnish Red Cross in the 20th century) and during the Winter War and Continuation War.

== Finnish paper industry ==
After leaving the army, Walden sought a career in business. He moved to Saint Petersburg, the capital of the Russian Empire, and after few years founded a sales agency for Finnish paper. As a steadfast patriot, Walden also became a prominent figure in the large Finnish community of Saint Petersburg. From 1906 to 1946, Walden worked in the paper industry. He worked to consolidate the Finnish paper industry. He founded Yhtyneet Paperitehtaat Oy (United Paper Mills Ltd) and was the first president of "Finpap", a Finnish paper sales association.

== Winter War ==
During the Finnish-Soviet Winter War, Walden was recalled to active service. From 3 December 1939 to 27 March 1940, he was a member of the war cabinet. On 27 March 1940 he became Minister of Defence and continued in this role till 27 November 1944. Walden was able to maintain important diplomatic relationships with Sweden and the United States. Walden represented Finland at the Treaty of Tartu of 1920, the Moscow Peace Treaty (1940), and the Armistice treaty of Moscow (1944).

After the Civil war and during the 1930s there was general distrust of the labour movement and the patriotism of the Finnish worker. In Winter War this proved unfounded and the nation was united. Industrial leader Walden and Väinö Tanner (Social Democrat leader and Finnish foreign minister) had developed mutual respect and worked well together. In the so-called Betrothal of January 1940, Finland's industry associations acknowledged the trade unions as negotiation partners regarding labour issues.

== Civilian and military decorations ==
In 1919, Walden became Commander of the Order of the White Rose. Later, he received the Grand Cross of the order. For his services during and after the Finnish Civil War he was awarded the Grand Cross of Liberty. He was also awarded the Iron Cross (1918). During the 1920s, Walden became a knight of the Order of the Polar Star (Sweden). In 1928, Walden received the Danish Grand Cross of the Order of the Dannebrog personally from King Christian X. During his service as minister of defence, Walden received several decorations including the Swedish Order of the Sword, the German Order of the German Eagle and Iron Cross (1939) 1st and 2nd class, the Hungarian Grand Cross of Order of Merit, and the Romanian Grand Cross of Order of the Star. On 2 December 1944 he received the Mannerheim Cross of the Order of the Cross of Liberty for his services to the country.

== See also ==
- Russification of Finland
- Finnish Civil War
- Pulp and paper industry
- Winter War
- Spirit of the Winter War
- Continuation War

Preceded by founder	UPM, President and CEO; 1920–1940	Succeeded by Juuso Walden
Preceded by Wilhelm Thesleff	Minister of War; 1918–1919	Succeeded by Karl Emil Berg
Preceded by Juho Niukkanen	Minister of Defence; 1940–1944	Succeeded by Väinö Valve
