= National Tripartite Committee =

Statutory body in Ghana

The National Tripartite Committee is a regulatory body in Ghana, composed of five representatives each for government, employers, and organized labor. It is chaired by the Minister of Manpower, Youth, and Employment. The committee is responsible for determining the national minimum wage. It also consults participants in the labor market in order to provide advice to the government on issues of employment and labor, and to generally promote employment and industrial peace.
