= Repola Oy =

Repola Oy was a Finnish industrial conglomerate, between 1990 and 1995, in the engineering and forest industries.

The company was formed by a merger between Yhtyneet Paperitehtaat ('United Paper Mills') and Rauma-Repola. Tauno Matomäki, the former president and CEO of Rauma-Repola, became CEO. Yhtyneet Paperitehtaat was the forestry and papermaking subsidiary, Rauma Oy the engineering.

Sunds Defibrator, a maker of defibrator equipment was also part of this merger. It was owned by SCA, Svenska Cellulosa Aktiebolaget. From 1987, Sunds Defibrator had acquired the equipment companies Jylhävaara and Rauma Repola Pulping Engineering, whilst in exchange becoming owned by the overall groups UPM and Rauma-Repola. In 1991, SCA sold the final third of Sunds Defibrator, it becoming wholly owned by Repola Oy. This made it the largest industrial company in Finland.

From 1995, Repola and its subsidiary Yhtyneet Paperitehtaat ('UPM'), merged with Kymmene Oy to form UPM-Kymmene. Operationally, the two companies operated as merged from November 1995, but the merger was legally enacted on 1 May 1996.
