= Myllykoski Corporation =

Finnish paper company

- Company type: Public
- Industry: Paper manufacturer
- Founded: Finland, Germany (1892)
- Headquarters: Finland, Germany; Switzerland; United States
- Key people: Tuomo Tuomela, Managing Director; Sakari Vainio, Finance Director; Tapio Ahola, Technical Development Director
- Number of employees: 3,300 (2007)

Myllykoski Corporation was a family owned international paper group with central offices in Helsinki and Anjalankoski, manufacturing in Germany, Finland and North America, and sales offices around the world. The roots of the company date back to its founding by the Björnberg family in 1892. The company was acquired in 2011 by Finnish manufacturer UPM-Kymmene.

== Products ==
The company makes supercalendered and coated (SC) paper and lightweight coated (LWC) paper, principally for use in magazines, catalogs, advertising inserts, and brochures. Myllykoski produces about 500,000 tons of paper annually, about 95% of which is exported to Europe, Africa, Asia, and the United States.

The company owns about 65% while the other 35% was held by M-real. Myllykoski's paper is sold in the US through Madison International Sales Company, another Myllykoski Corporation subsidiary.

Myllykoski is the third-largest producer of SC paper in the world and is among the top five in coated mechanical grades.

The European mills of Myllykoski are certified according to the guidelines of ISO 9001, ISO 14001 and OHSAS 18001. In addition to that, the German mills participate in the EMAS II validation. The mills in North America operate according to the standards of European mills, although they are not certified.

== Myllykoski Corporation Group ==
=== Myllykoski Paper ===
Myllykoski Paper producing mechanical uncoated (SC) and coated publication paper which yield about 570,000 tonnes annually. The company owns 50% of the Finnish pulp producer Sunila Oy together with Stora Enso.

=== Myllykoski Continental ===
Myllykoski Continental includes Lang Papier of Germany (newsprint and SC paper), MD Albbruck (coated offset paper in reels and sheets) and MD Plattling (coated rotogravure). The combined production capacity of Myllykoski Continental is 1.5 million tonnes annually.

Papierfabrik Utzenstorf of Switzerland (newsprint, UMI) left Myllykoski Corporation with management buyout by 24. June 2009.

- Utzenstorf Papier
- Lang Papier

=== Myllykoski North America ===
Myllykoski North America includes Madison Paper Industries, in Madison, Maine, producing mechanical uncoated offset and rotogravure which yield about 220,000 tonnes annually. Madison Paper Company in Alsip, Illinois, recycled fiber-based coated offset which produced 140,000 tonnes annually.

- Alsip mill Divested 9/11/2009 to the Watermill Group from Lexington, Mass.
- Madison mill

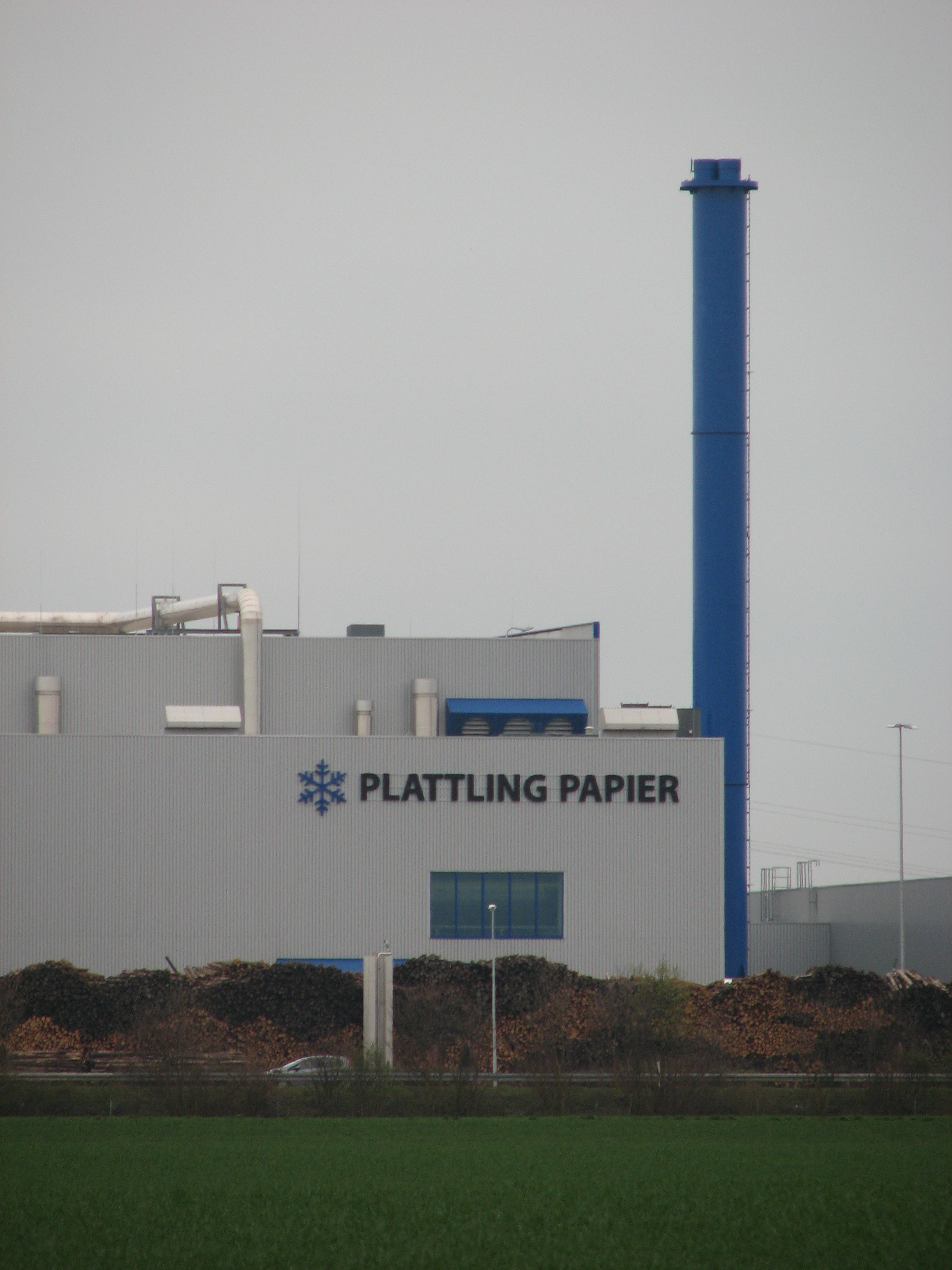
Plattling Papier

=== Alliance partner ===
Rhein Papier is a legally independent company managed by Myllykoski Continental. The capacity of Rhein Papier is 280,000 TPa newsprint.

- Rhein Papier
- Plattling Papier
