= Collective agreement =

Agreement between employers and employees

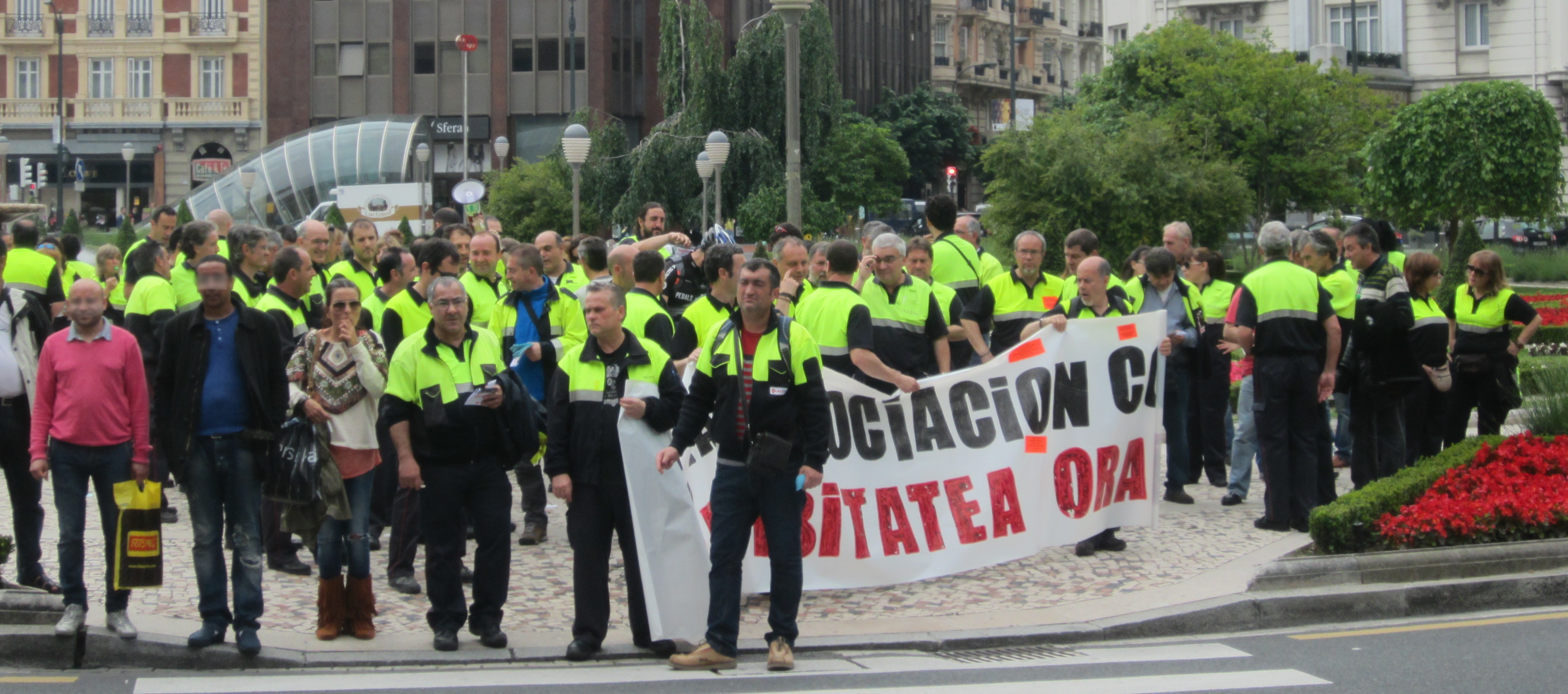
Demonstration of employees of OTA/TAO (traffic and parking ordenation) of Bilbao demanding the negotiation of their collective labour agreement.

A collective agreement, collective labour agreement (CLA) or collective bargaining agreement (CBA) is a written contract negotiated through collective bargaining for employees by one or more trade unions with the management of a company (or with an employers' association) that regulates the terms and conditions of employees at work. This includes regulating the wages, benefits, and duties of the employees and the duties and responsibilities of the employer or employers and often includes rules for a dispute resolution process.

== Finland ==
In Finland, collective labour agreements are universally valid. This means that a collective agreement in an economic sector becomes a universally applicable legal minimum for any individual's employment contract, whether or not they are a union member. For this condition to apply, half of the workforce in that sector needs to be union members, thus supporting the agreement. Workers are not forced to join a union in a specific workplace. Nevertheless, with 70% average unionization, most economic sectors are under a collective labour agreement. An agreement does not prohibit higher wages and better benefits, but establishes a legal minimum, similarly to a minimum wage. Furthermore, a national income policy agreement is often, but not always reached, which includes all trade unions, employers' associations, and the Finnish government.

== Germany ==
Collective agreements in Germany are legally binding. Germans pride themselves in a supposedly more cooperative spirit in industrial relations when compared to other countries, for example when contrasted to the historically more adversarial nature of industrial relations in the United Kingdom as described in § United Kingdom. German workers by law have a right to representation on company boards. Together, management and workers are considered "social partners".

== Italy ==
Like in Finland, collective labour agreement determinate a universal applicabile legal minimum wage, which is universally valid (in Latin: erga omnes), whether the worker is a member of a trade union or not. Both employers' associations and trade unions of wage workers of the public and private sectors have the right to unilaterally withdraw from the contract. The introduction of collective labour agreement in Italy took place during the fascist period with the promulgation of the Labour Charter of 1927. In 1959, Vigorelli-type laws transferred the national collective labor agreements in force at the time into an ordinary law in such a way as to make the set of economic and regulatory rights established in these agreements universal and binding.

In December 2010, for the first time in the history of Italian industrial relations, Sergio Marchionne decided to unilaterally let the Fiat group out of Confindustria and Federmeccanica. The Fiat group decided to start separate negotiations with some trade union organizations to define a specific company contract for the automotive sector in force within its plants, as an exception to and in lieu of the national collective labor contract. In 2013, the Associazione Bancaria Italiana was the first association to decide to cancel the national collective labor agreement of the banking sector and to adopt a separate negotiation with the trade union organizations. In the subsequent contractual renewals of 2018 and 2022, the trade unions and bank's associations agreed on the right of withdrawal from the national collective labor agreement for both parties.

== Sweden ==
In Sweden about 90 per cent of all employees are covered by collective agreements, in the private sector 83 per cent (2017). Collective agreements usually contain provisions concerning minimum wages. Sweden does not have statutory regulation of minimum wages or legislation on extension of collective agreements to unorganized employers. Non-organized employers can sign substitute agreements directly with trade unions, but many do not. The Swedish model of self-regulation applies only to workplaces and employees covered by collective agreements.

== United Kingdom ==
At common law, Ford v A.U.E.F. [1969], the courts once held that collective agreements were not binding. Then, the Industrial Relations Act 1971, introduced by Robert Carr (Employment Minister in Edward Heath's cabinet), provided that collective agreements were binding unless a written contract clause declared otherwise. After the demise of the Heath government, the law was reversed to reflect the tradition in British industrial relations policy of legal abstentionism from workplace disputes. The law is now contained in the Trade Union and Labour Relations (Consolidation) Act 1992 s.179, whereby in the United Kingdom collective agreements are conclusively deemed to be not legally binding. This presumption may be rebutted when the agreement is in writing and contains an explicit provision asserting that it should be legally enforceable.

Although the collective agreement itself is not enforceable, many of the terms negotiated will relate to pay, conditions, holidays, pensions and so on. These terms will be incorporated into an employee's contract of employment (whether or not the employee is a union member); and the contract of employment is, of course, enforceable. If the new terms are unacceptable to any individuals, they can object to his employer; but if the majority of workers have acquiesced, the company will be able to sack the complainants, normally with impunity.

The British law reflects the historic adversarial nature of UK industrial relations. Also, there is a background fear by employees that if their trade union sued for breach of a collective agreement, the union could become bankrupt, leaving employees without representation in collective bargaining. This unfortunate situation may be slowly changing, partly through EU influences. Japanese and Chinese firms that have UK factories (particularly in the motor industry) try to imbue their workers with the company ethic. This approach has been adopted by indigenous UK firms such as Tesco.

== United States ==
In the United States, collective bargaining agreements are recognised.

== See also ==
- Intention to be legally bound
- Labour economics
- Labour law
- Labour rights
- NBA Collective Bargaining Agreement, an agreement between the National Basketball Players Association and the National Basketball Association
- NFL Collective Bargaining Agreement, an agreement between the National Football League Players Association and the National Football League
- NHL Collective Bargaining Agreement, an agreement between the National Hockey League Players' Association and the National Hockey League
