= UPM (company) =

Finnish forest industry company

UPM-Kymmene Oyj
- Type: Julkinen osakeyhtiö
- Traded as: Nasdaq Helsinki: UPM; OMXH25 component
- Industry: Paper, pulp and timber
- Predecessor: Raf. Haarla Oy
- Founded: 1996; 30 years ago
- Headquarters: Helsinki, Finland
- Key people: Henrik Ehrnrooth (Chairman), Massimo Reynaudo (President and CEO)
- Products: Pulp, paper, plywood, sawn timber, labels and composites, bioenergy, biofuels for transport and biochemicals
- Revenue: €11,720 million (2021)
- Operating income: €2,096 million (2022)
- Net income: €1,556 million (2022)
- Total assets: €22,207 million (2022)
- Total equity: €12,879 million (2022)
- Number of employees: 17,200 (2022)
- Website: www.upm.com

UPM-Kymmene Oyj is a Finnish forest industry company. UPM-Kymmene was formed by the merger of Kymmene Corporation with Repola Oy and its subsidiary United Paper Mills Ltd in 1996. UPM consists of six business areas: UPM Fibres, UPM Energy, UPM Raflatac, UPM Specialty Papers, UPM Communication Papers and UPM Plywood. The Group employs around 17,000 people and it has production plants in 11 countries. UPM shares are listed on the NASDAQ OMX Helsinki stock exchange. UPM is the only paper company listed in the global Dow Jones Sustainability Index and also a member of the United Nations Global Compact organization.

UPM is the owner and maintainer of the Verla mill, which has been a museum since 1972 and a UNESCO World Heritage Site since 1996.

== History ==
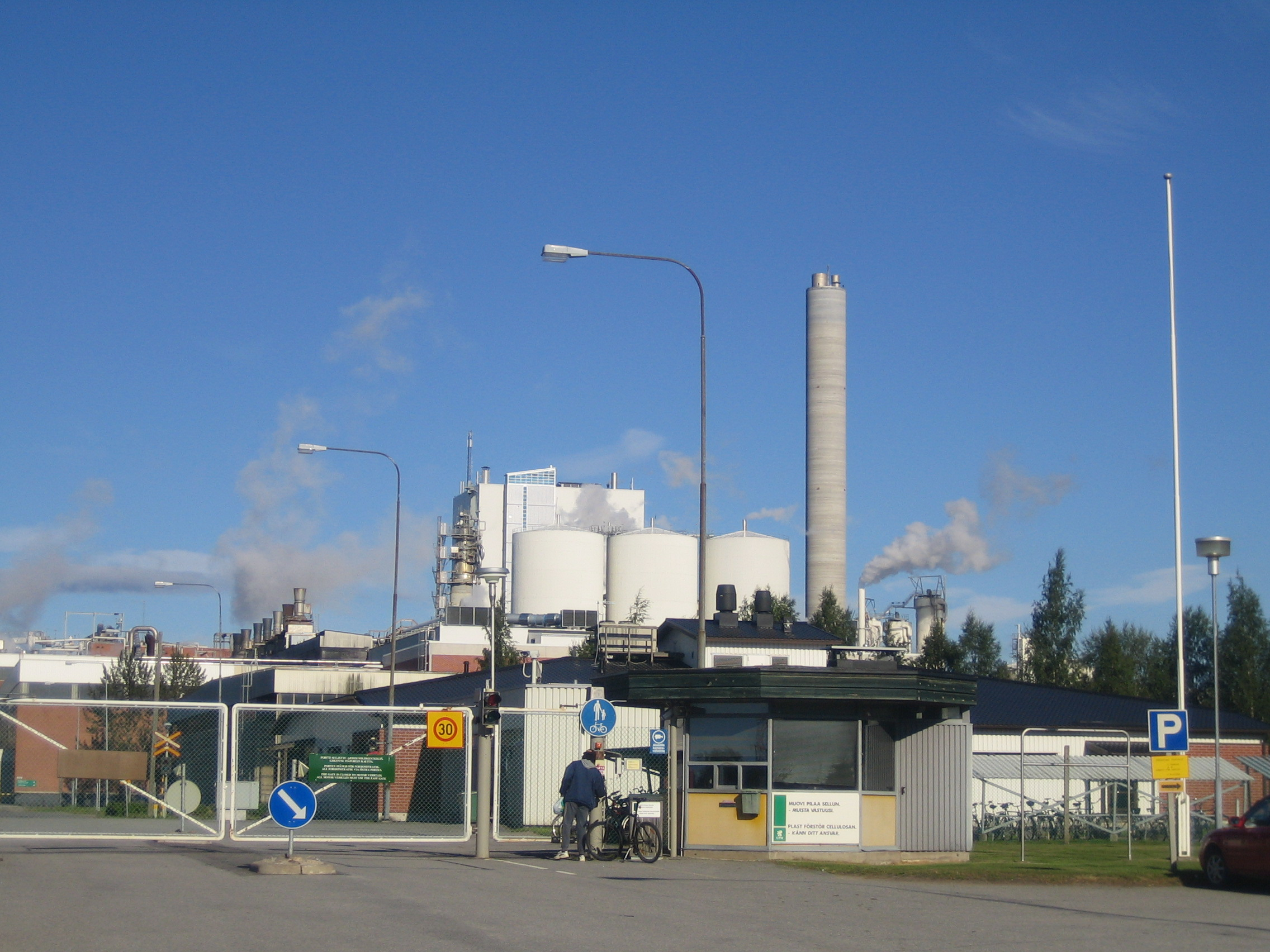
UPM paper mill in Jakobstad, Finland

The company's oldest mill was Papeteries de Docelles located in northeastern France, which produced traditional handpaper at the end of the 15th century. The mill got its first paper-making machine in the 1830s. UPM Docelles was disbanded in 2014.

The company has a long tradition of forest industries in Finland. The company's first paper mills and sawmills were put into operation in the beginning of the 1870s. Pulp manufacturing began in the 1880s and paper converting in the 1920s. The company started manufacturing plywood in the 1930s. Several Finnish forest industry companies have merged with the forerunner companies of UPM, such as: Walkiakoski, Jämsänkoski, Kaukas, Halla, Kajaani, Toppila, Kymmene, Kuusankoski, Kymi, Voikkaa, Lohjan Paperi Oy, Wilh. Schauman, W. Rosenlew, Raf. Haarla and Myllykoski.

The company logo, the griffin, was designed by Hugo Simberg in 1899. It is probable that the griffin was chosen as the company logo because it represents a guardian of the northern forests. The griffin logo is the oldest continuous company logo in Finland.

=== 2000–2010 ===
Due to worldwide overproduction of paper, UPM announced a cost reduction program in 2006. The Voikkaa paper mill in Kuusankoski was closed and nearly 3,000 employees in Finland were laid off. After the closure, the area was transformed into the Voikkaa business area.

The Miramichi paper mill in New Brunswick, which UPM acquired in 2000, was closed in 2007. Also a number of plywood mills and sawmills were closed during the years. In December 2008 UPM closed Kajaani paper mill and Tervasaari pulp mill in Valkeakoski. 1,100 employees were laid off. The former premises of the Kajaani mill were turned into a business park called Renforsin Ranta.

=== 2011–2020 ===
The overcapacity continued in graphic paper business and in 2011, UPM acquired Myllykoski Corporation and Rhein Papier GmbH, which consists of seven publication paper mills in Germany, Finland and the United States. In France, UPM closed Stracel paper mill in 2013 and Docelles paper mill in 2014. Madison paper mill in the USA was closed in 2016.The Schwedt paper mill in Germany was sold in 2017. Specialty paper production expanded to China and Germany in 2015 and 2019, respectively. Kaipola paper mill in Finland was closed in 2020.

In 2015, the production of wood-based biofuels started at the biorefinery in Lappeenranta, Finland.

In July 2019, UPM announced that it will invest US$2.7 billion in a eucalyptus pulp mill near Paso de los Toros in central Uruguay. The new pulp mill was started up in April 2023 with a total investment of US$3.47 billion and has a production capacity of 2.1 million tonnes of pulp per year. This is the second pulp mill the company opened in Uruguay, after the UPM Fray Bentos, which makes 1.3 million tonnes of pulp per year.

In January 2020, UPM announced that it will invest EUR 550 million in an industrial scale biorefinery to convert solid wood into next-generation biochemicals: bio-monoethylene glycol (BioMEG) and lignin-based renewable functional fillers. The biorefinery will also produce bio-monopropyleneglycol (BioMPG) and industrial sugars. The total annual capacity of the biorefinery will be 220,000 tonnes. The facility is scheduled to start up by the end of 2023. The capital expenditure estimate has been increased to EUR 750 million.

== Businesses ==
=== Business areas ===
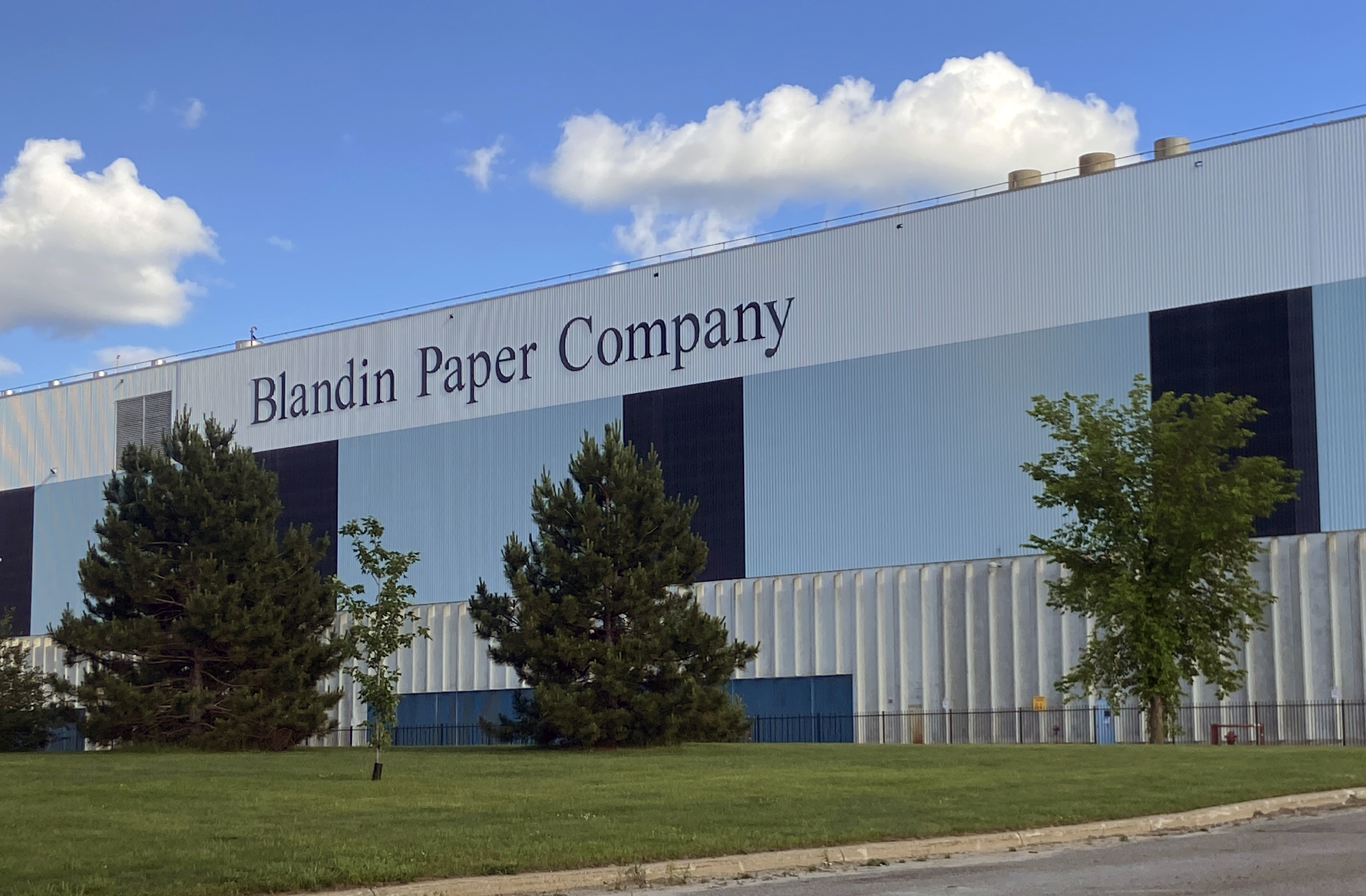
UPM Blandin paper mill, Grand Rapids, Minnesota

UPM manufactures fibre products, wood products, molecular bioproducts and low-emission energy in six business areas. These business areas are connected with a common idea: to create value from renewable and recyclable raw materials by synthesizing them with know-how and technology.

- UPM Fibres
- UPM Energy
- UPM Raflatac
- UPM Specialty Papers
- UPM Communication Papers
- UPM Plywood

=== UPM Fibres ===
UPM Fibres consists of pulp and timber businesses. UPM has five modern pulp mills: three in Finland and two in Uruguay, and also four sawmills in Finland. The pulp mills produce 5.8 million tons of high quality pulp annually. 27% of the company's comparable EBIT came from UPM Fibres in 2022.

In July 2019 UPM announced that it will invest US$2.7 billion in a eucalyptus pulp mill near Paso de los Toros in central Uruguay. In January 2022, UPM updated the total investment estimate to US$3.47 billion. The new pulp mill was started up in April 2023.

=== UPM Energy ===
UPM Energy's power generation capacity consists of hydropower, nuclear power and thermal power. UPM Energy is the second largest electricity producer in Finland. UPM owns 47.69% of Pohjolan Voima Oyj, which is a majority shareholder (58.5%) in Teollisuuden Voima Oyj (TVO). UPM also owns 9 hydropower plants in Finland. 18% of the company's comparable EBIT came from UPM Energy in 2022.

=== UPM Raflatac ===
UPM Raflatac manufactures labelling materials for branding and promotion and information labelling in the food, beverage, personal care, pharmaceutical and retail segments, for example. UPM Raflatac has 12 factories and 24 slitting and distribution terminals in all continents. 10% of the company's comparable EBIT came from UPM Raflatac in 2021.

=== UPM Specialty Papers ===
UPM Specialty Papers offers labelling and packaging materials as well as office and graphic papers for labelling, commercial siliconising, packaging, office use and printing. The paper mills are located in China, Germany and Finland. 7% of the company's comparable EBIT came from UPM Speciality Papers in 2022.

=== UPM Communication Papers ===
UPM has 13 paper mills in Finland, Germany, Great Britain, France, Austria and the United States. Several of the mills work simultaneously as recycling centres and as producers of bioenergy. In terms of revenue, paper production is still the largest business group of the company. 30% of the company's comparable EBIT came from UPM Communication Papers in 2022.

=== UPM Plywood ===
UPM is the largest plywood manufacturer in Europe. The plywood operations consists of eight plywood mills in Finland and Estonia. 5% of the company's comparable EBIT came from UPM Plywood in 2022.

=== Other businesses ===
UPM offers a wide selection of different services for forest owners. UPM owns 522,000 hectares of forest in Finland. All of the company's forests are certified.

Most of the wood needed for the UPM factories is acquired from private forests of Finland. UPM is acquiring all kinds of wood and uses it to produce pulp, paper, plywood, sawn timber and energy. UPM refines UPM Bonvesta properties from its real estates.

UPM Biofuels, UPM Biochemicals, UPM Biomedicals and UPM Biocomposites businesses form a business unit UPM Biorefining. UPM Biofuels produces wood-based renewable diesel for all diesel engines and renewable naphtha that can be used as a biocomponent for gasoline or for replacing fossil raw materials in the petrochemical industry. UPM Biochemicals offers and develops wood-based biochemicals. The product segments are glycols, lignin products and renewable functional fillers. UPM Biomedicals develops and supplies wood-based biomedical products for various applications. UPM Biocomposites offers composite materials for outdoor building material and consumer products. UPM is currently constructing a biochemical refinery in Leuna, Germany. The biorefinery is scheduled to start production by the end of 2023. The capital expenditure estimate is EUR 750 million.

=== Biofore ===
In 2009, UPM created the term "Biofore" to describe new forest industry. The Biofore term is also used in the company's slogan: UPM - The Biofore Company. In 2018, UPM launched brand promise 'UPM Biofore – Beyond fossils'. In 2021 UPM stated its purpose: 'We create a future beyond fossils'.

== Global operations ==
UPM's products are manufactured in 11 countries and the company has a worldwide sales network. UPM's production plants are located in China, Estonia, Finland, France, Germany, Malaysia, Poland, UK, Uruguay and USA.

=== China ===
UPM has two production units in China: UPM Changshu paper mill and UPM Raflatac, Changshu Labelstock factory. Changshu is located in the Province of Jiangsu by the Yangtze River, some 100 km from Shanghai.

=== France ===
UPM has one production unit in France. The UPM Raflatac labelstock factory located in Pompey, 10 km north of Nancy and 40 km south of Metz.

=== Germany ===
UPM has seven production units in Germany.

- UPM Augsburg paper mill, located by the river Lech in the city of Augsburg, a town in southern Germany, some 65 km from Munich
- UPM Ettringen paper mill, in the town of Ettringen
- UPM Hürth paper mill, located in the town of Hürth
- UPM Nordland Papier, located in Dörpen, a village in northwestern Germany, some 250 km from Hamburg
- UPM Plattling paper mill, located in the town of Plattling
- UPM Schongau paper mill, located in the city of Schongau, a town in Upper Bavaria

There is also a wood plastic composite factory in Germany: UPM ProFi, Bruchsal wood plastic composite factory, located in Bruchsal approximately 20 km northeast of Karlsruhe in the state of Baden-Württemberg. Distance to Frankfurt is some 120 km and to Stuttgart some 80 km.

=== UK ===
UPM has two production units in the United Kingdom.

- UPM Caledonian paper mill, located in Irvine, North Ayrshire a coastal town in southwestern Scotland, 50 km (30 mi) from Glasgow.
- UPM Raflatac labelstock factory, located in Scarborough.

=== Uruguay ===
UPM has a pulp mill in Fray Bentos, Uruguay. The mill produces bleached hardwood kraft pulp (BHKP) from eucalyptus and renewable energy in their recovery boilers and provides CO_{2}-neutral biomass-based electricity for the Uruguayan markets. In 2011 UPM expanded plantation grounds in Uruguay. In February 2011, UPM announced a plan to build a second nursery in Uruguay to secure the availability of high-quality seedlings and seed material. Argentina and Uruguay had a conflict regarding UPM emissions in 2013. In 2020, UPM began the construction of its third nursery in Uruguay, located in Central Uruguay. The nursery was completed in 2022, and has an annual production capacity of more than 10 million seedlings.

Metsä Botnia, a part of Metsä Group, opened Fray Bentos factory in Uruguay in 2007. Until the end of 2009 the owners of Metsä-Botnia were M-real 30%, Metsä Group (ex Metsäliitto = Finn Forest) 23% and UPM-Kymmene (UPM) 47%, and since the end of 2009, UPM 91% and Metsä Group 9%.

=== Table of production sites ===
Country	Production type	Production units
Austria	Paper	UPM Steyrermühl
Austria	Forest and timber	UPM Steyrermühl sawmill
China	Paper	UPM Changshu
China	Label	UPM Raflatac, Changshu
Estonia	Plywood	Otepää plywood mill
Finland	Paper	UPM Jämsänkoski; UPM Kaukas; UPM Kymi; UPM Rauma; UPM Tervasaari
Finland	Pulp	UPM Kaukas; UPM Kymi; UPM Pietarsaari
Finland	Label	UPM Raflatac, Tampere
Finland	Plywood	UPM Joensuu plywood mill; UPM Pellos plywood mill; UPM Savonlinna plywood mill; UPM Kalso veneer mill
Finland	Timber	UPM Alholma sawmill; UPM Kaukas sawmill; UPM Korkeakoski sawmill; UPM Seikku sawmill
Finland	Energy	UPM Harjavalta hydro power plant; UPM Kallioinen hydro power plant; UPM Kaltimo hydro power plant; UPM Katerma hydro power plant; UPM Keltti hydro power plant; UPM Kuusankoski hydro power plant; UPM Tyrvää hydro power plant; UPM Voikkaa hydro power plant; UPM Äetsä hydro power plant
Finland	Other	UPM Biocomposites, Lahti (wood plastic composite); UPM Lappeenranta Biorefinery (biofuels)
France	Paper	
France	Label	UPM Raflatac, Nancy
Germany	Paper	UPM Augsburg; UPM Hürth; UPM Ettringen; UPM Nordland Papier, Dörpen; UPM Plattling; UPM Schongau
Germany	Other	UPM Biocomposites, Bruchsal (wood plastic composite) UPM Biochemicals Biorefinery, Leuna (under construction)
Malaysia	Label	UPM Raflatac, Johor
Poland	Label	UPM Raflatac, Nowa Wies; UPM Raflatac, Wroclaw
United Kingdom	Paper	UPM Caledonian Paper
United Kingdom	Label	UPM Raflatac, Scarborough
Uruguay	Pulp	UPM Fray Bentos UPM Paso de los Toros
United States	Paper	UPM Blandin Grand Rapids, MN
United States	Label	UPM Raflatac Fletcher, NC; UPM Raflatac Dixon, IL; UPM Raflatac Mills River, NC

== Biofuels ==
UPM is developing new business on wood based biofuels for transport. The brand name for the biofuels of UPM is UPM BioVerno. The production concepts are based on non-food raw materials and they result in a significant reduction of greenhouse gas emissions. The UPM Biofuels surpass both the EU and Finnish requirements for sustainable biofuels.

=== Biorefinery ===
UPM has invested in a biorefinery producing biofuels from crude tall oil in Lappeenranta, Finland. The biorefinery produces annually approximately 130,000 tonnes of advanced second generation biodiesel for transport. Construction of the biorefinery began in the summer of 2012 at UPM's Kaukas mill site and was completed in 2014. UPM's total investment amounted to approximately EUR 179 million. The construction of the biorefinery offered work for nearly 200 people for approximately two years. The biorefinery directly employs nearly 50 people and indirectly about 150 people.

Development is currently ongoing, with the aim of expanding the biofuels business with new types of technology concepts and biomass-based raw materials. In January 2021, UPM started the basic engineering phase of a potential new biorefinery, with site option assessment primarily in two locations: Kotka, Finland and Rotterdam, the Netherlands. In January 2022 UPM decided that the work continues in Rotterdam.

=== Biochemicals ===
UPM Biochemicals is preparing for a commercial-scale market entry. The next generation biochemicals refinery in Leuna, Germany is scheduled to start production by the end of 2023. The biorefinery will have an annual capacity of 220,000 tonnes of wood-based biochemicals, the main products being bio-monoethylene glycol (BioMEG), bio-monopropylene glycol (BioMPG) and renewable functional fillers. The wood-based biochemicals replace fossil-based raw materials in various applications such as textiles, PET bottles, packaging, cosmetics, pharmaceuticals, detergents, rubbers and resins. As an example, UPM develops wood-based recyclable PET bottles in co-operation with the Coca-Cola Company.

== Research and development ==
=== UPM Grada ===
UPM Plywood has developed a new way to manufacture layered composites and the new form of plywood is called UPM Grada. At the core of the new technology is a special adhesive film, which allows the plywood to be formed after manufacturing. UPM Grada Plywood can be safely recycled or burned at the end of its lifecycle. UPM Grada Plywood can be used e.g. in furniture. The Finnish furniture manufacturer Isku has introduced the new Kaava chair which demonstrates the capabilities of UPM Grada Plywood.

=== UPM ProFi ===
UPM ProFi composite is a Biofore material that combines the characteristics of cellulose fibres and plastic. Manufactured mainly from recycled raw material, the composite is suitable for use in patios, terraces, piers and playgrounds. The material does not require polishing, lacquer finishing or other surface finishing. The material was a result of UPM's own research and product development. UPM ProFi has been used in the manufacture of a pedestrian walkway in the previously historic city of Ghent, Belgium.

=== UPM Formi ===
UPM Formi is a recyclable and odorless composite which can be used to replace plastic in many instances. UPM Formi composite granulates are manufactured from clean polymers and pulp. UPM offers the granulates in three grades for injection molding – Formi GP for general use, Formi SP for special surface, and Formi TP for technical applications. The UPM Formi -material has already been used in the manufacture of a mobile phone microscope, launched by KeepLoop Oy. The Finnish company, MySoda, designs and manufactures the first-ever sparkling water makers made of wood-based biocomposite, UPM Formi EcoAce. The biocomposite is made using certified renewable fibres and polymers derived from UPM BioVerno naphtha.

== See also ==
- Ahlstrom
- Alholmens Kraft Power Station
- Stora Enso
- Svenska Cellulosa Aktiebolaget
- List of Finnish companies
